= List of Father Ted episodes =

This is an episode list for the sitcom Father Ted created by Arthur Mathews and Graham Linehan, and was produced by Hat Trick Productions for Channel 4. It stars Dermot Morgan, Ardal O'Hanlon, Frank Kelly and Pauline McLynn. The series is set on the fictional Craggy Island off the coast of Ireland and is about three Roman Catholic priests and their housekeeper.

During the course of the programme, 25 episodes of Father Ted aired over three series, between 21 April 1995 and 1 May 1998.

== Series overview ==
Series
Series	Episodes	Originally released	
Series	Episodes	First released	Last released
1	6	21 April 1995	26 May 1995
2	10	8 March 1996	10 May 1996
Special		24 December 1996	
3	8	13 March 1998	1 May 1998

== Episodes ==
=== Series 1 (1995) ===
No. overall	No. in series	Title	Directed by	Written by	Original release date
1	1	"Good Luck, Father Ted"	Declan Lowney	Graham Linehan and Arthur Mathews	21 April 1995
A television programme offers to interview Father Ted, who goes to extreme lengths to ensure the other members of the clergy on the island do not interrupt his moment in the spotlight. Meanwhile Craggy Island hosts Fun Land, a funfair to which Dougal is desperate to go. Ted takes the film crew to the fair, leading to a massive mess. Guest stars (in order as credited): Gerard Lee as Terry MacNamee, Pat Shortt as Tom, Noelle Brown as Teaching Nun, Blanaid Irvine as Tarot Reader, Patrick Drury as John O'Leary, Rynagh O'Grady as Mary O'Leary, Mark Murray as Surly Youth.
2	2	"Entertaining Father Stone"	Declan Lowney	Graham Linehan and Arthur Mathews	28 April 1995
Ted and Dougal are devastated as an inoffensive but unbearably boring priest, Father Stone, arrives on Craggy Island for his annual visit. Ted prays for Father Stone to be taken away, but is later wracked with guilt when Father Stone is struck by lightning. The title is a pun on the Joe Orton play Entertaining Mr Sloane. Special guest star: Michael Redmond as Father Paul Stone. Guest stars (in order as credited): Arthur Mathews as Father Billy Kerrigan, David Carey as Doctor, Patrick Drury as John O'Leary, Rynagh O'Grady as Mary O'Leary, Kate Binchy as Mrs. Stone, James Berwick as Mr. Stone, Joane Hall as Granny Stone.
3	3	"The Passion of Saint Tibulus"	Declan Lowney	Graham Linehan and Arthur Mathews	5 May 1995
Bishop Leonard Brennan arrives at the parochial house on an official visit with news that a blasphemous film, condemned by the pope and banned everywhere, is being shown in Craggy Island thanks to a loophole. He orders the priests to make a stand and protest at the cinema, but they discover secrets about the Bishop and his love-child. Special guest star: Jim Norton as Bishop Brennan; Guest stars (in order as credited): Derrick Branche as Father Jose Fernandez, Geoffrey Perkins as Spanish Interpreter v/o, Jon Kenny as Michael Cocheese, Pat Leavy as Woman in Cinema, Patrick Drury as John O'Leary, Rynagh O'Grady as Mary O'Leary, Don Foley as Jim Halpin, Ann Rowan as Mrs. Sheridan, Blanaid Irvine as Mrs. Glynn, Hugh B. O'Brien as Pat Harty.
4	4	"Competition Time"	Declan Lowney	Graham Linehan and Arthur Mathews	12 May 1995
Ahead of the annual 'All Priests Stars in Their Eyes Lookalike Competition', Ted, determined to beat his arch-nemesis Father Dick Byrne from Rugged Island, reveals his Elvis costume, only to find that Dougal and Jack have the exact same costume for themselves. Meanwhile, television celebrity Henry Sellers stays at the house. Special guest star: Niall Buggy as Henry Sellers; Guest stars (in order as credited): Maurice O'Donoghue as Father Dick Byrne, Don Wycherley as Father Cyril McDuff, Chris Curran as Father Jim Johnson, Fergus O'Kelly as Father Barty Dunne, John Olohan as Sgt. Deegan, Paul Woodfull as Father Harry Coyle, Jean Ainslie as Jane, Edwina Day as Monica. Note: This episode is not generally shown on linear television, because of potential controversy over some of the characters dressing in Blackface. It remains available through on-demand and streaming services.
5	5	"And God Created Woman"	Declan Lowney	Graham Linehan and Arthur Mathews	19 May 1995
Father Ted meets novelist Polly Clarke at the book signing for her latest novel Bejewelled with Kisses. Ted then finds out that Polly is renting a cottage across the island as he begins to fall for her, and she invites him for more 'book chat'. Meanwhile Dougal, Mrs Doyle and Father Jack get in the way of Ted's plans, causing disruption. Special guest star: Gemma Craven as Polly Clarke; Guest stars (in order as credited): Rosemary Henderson as Sister Assumpta, Clare Cathcart as Sister Margaret, Don Foley as Jim Halpin, Pat Shortt as Tom.
6	6	"Grant Unto Him Eternal Rest"	Declan Lowney	Graham Linehan and Arthur Mathews	26 May 1995
Father Ted is unconcerned when he discovers Jack has drunk a bottle of floor polish, but Sister Monica realises that a lack of pulse and no breathing can only mean one thing, Father Jack is dead. However, Jack has left some money in his will for Ted and Dougal. But will he stay dead enough for them to get it? Guest stars (in order as credited): Mairead McKinley as Sister Monica, Zara Turner as Laura Sweeney, Kevin Sharkey as Donegal Priest, Tommy Duggan as Father Paul Cleary, Jimmy Keogh as Father Fintan Fay, Shay Gorman as Father Jim Sutton.

=== Series 2 (1996) ===
No. overall	No. in series	Title	Directed by	Written by	Original release date
7	1	"Hell"	Declan Lowney	Graham Linehan and Arthur Mathews	8 March 1996
Ted, Dougal and Jack take their annual holiday and encounter Father Noel Furlong. Guest stars (in order as credited): Pat Shortt as Tom, Joe Taylor as Sewage Supervisor, Luke Hayden as Mr. Gleason, Ann Hayden as Mrs. Gleason, Robert English as Policeman, Tony Guilfoyle as Father Larry Duff, Graham Norton as Father Noel Furlong, Tom Farrelly as Gerry Fields, Yvonne Shanely as Janine Reilly, Stephen Gallagher as Tony Lynch, Sharon Carroll as Nuala Ryan, Laura Bermingham as Woman on Yacht.
8	2	"Think Fast, Father Ted"	Declan Lowney	Graham Linehan and Arthur Mathews	15 March 1996
When Ted holds a raffle, he destroys the prize - a new car. The title is a play on the novel "Think Fast, Mr. Moto", by John P. Marquand and the film of the same title starring Peter Lorre. Guest stars (in order as credited): James Benson as Father Liam Finnegan, Gerry O'Brien as Father Billy O'Dwyer, Ben Keaton as Father Austin Purcell.
9	3	"Tentacles of Doom"	Declan Lowney	Graham Linehan and Arthur Mathews	22 March 1996
Three bishops visit the island. A worried Ted gives Jack elocution lessons beforehand. Guest stars (in order as credited): Malcolm Douglas and Mark O'Regan as Vatican Priests, Kevin Moore as Bishop O'Neill, Denys Hawthorne as Bishop Facks, Paddy Ward as Bishop Jordan, Tony Guilfoyle as Father Larry Duff.
10	4	"Old Grey Whistle Theft"	Declan Lowney	Graham Linehan and Arthur Mathews	29 March 1996
Dougal starts hanging around with a rebellious priest, Father Damo Lennon. Meanwhile a valuable whistle is stolen. The title is a pun on the BBC music show The Old Grey Whistle Test. Guest stars (in order as credited): Joe Rooney as Father Damien Lennon, John Olohan as Seargeant Hodgins, Tony Giilfoyle as Father Larry Duff, Rio Fanning as Father Frost, Arthur Mathews and Charlotte Bradley as Picnic Couple, Mal White as Benson, Don Foley as Jim, Patrick Drury as John, Rynagh O'Grady as Mary, Ann Rowan as Mrs. Glynn.
11	5	"A Song for Europe"	Declan Lowney	Graham Linehan and Arthur Mathews	5 April 1996
Ted is goaded by Father Dick Byrne into attempting to write a song for "Eurosong '96" (spoof of the Eurovision Song Contest). Despite Ted's song having only one note, Ireland's fear of winning the contest again (and therefore having to fund the following year's edition) plays into Ted and Dougal's hands. This mirrors the real-life belief that Ireland chose the 1994 Eurovision entry, "Rock 'n' Roll Kids", which was thought to differ greatly from the typical winning song, to ensure that they did not have to host the contest again. Guest stars (in order as credited): Maurice O'Donoghue as Father Dick Byrne, Don Wycherley as Father Cyril MacDuff, Peter Caffrey as Charles Hedges, Jon Kenny as Fred Rickwood.
12	6	"The Plague"	Declan Lowney	Graham Linehan and Arthur Mathews	12 April 1996
The parochial house is infested by rabbits, just as the very rabbit-phobic Bishop Brennan plans a visit. Guest stars (in order as credited): James Rymer as Father Brendan, Arthur Mathews as Father Ben, David Heap as Mr. Noonan, Joan Sheehy as Mrs. Noonan, Jim Norton as Bishop Len Brennan, Tony Guilfoyle as Father Larry Duff, Paul Wonderful as Paddy Jordan, Pat Shortt as Tom.
13	7	"Rock a Hula Ted"	Declan Lowney	Graham Linehan and Arthur Mathews	19 April 1996
A female singer (a parody of Sinéad O'Connor) visits the island just when Ted is judging the annual Lovely Girls competition, a parody of Ireland's Rose of Tralee festival. Guest stars (in order as credited): C.P. Grogan as Niamh Connelly, Alan Shortt as Interviewer, Maggie Conway as Deaf Signer, Dermot Crowley as Father Liam Deliverance, Eddie Bannon, Joe Gallagher, Mick Nolan and Joe Taylor as The Lads, Dawn Bradfield as Imelda.
14	8	"Cigarettes and Alcohol and Rollerblading"	Declan Lowney	Graham Linehan and Arthur Mathews	26 April 1996
In a game of one-upmanship with Dick Byrne, Ted decides the three priests must give something up for Lent. Father Jack gives up alcohol, Dougal gives up rollerblading and Ted gives up smoking. They encounter difficulty keeping their vows, and enlist the help of Sister Assumpta. However, her methods are not what they had in mind. The title is a reference to the Oasis song ‘Cigarettes and Alcohol’. Guest stars (in order as credited): Maurice O'Donoghue as Father Dick Byrne, Patrick Drury as John, Rynagh O'Grady as Mary, Irene Warren as Singing Nun, Nuala Walsh as Sister Mary Gondola, Rosemary Henderson as Sister Assumpta, Tony Guilfoyle as Father Larry Duff, Don Wycherley as Father Cyril MacDuff, Chris Curran as Father Jim Johnson.
15	9	"New Jack City"	Declan Lowney	Graham Linehan and Arthur Mathews	3 May 1996
Jack's hairy hands get him sent to an old priests' home. Unfortunately his replacement, Father Fintan Stack, is much worse. An avid fan of jungle music, he doesn't take kindly to the other inhabitants of the parochial house. The title is taken from the movie New Jack City. Guest stars (in order as credited): Vass Anderson as Doctor Sinnot, Brendan Grace as Father Fintan Stack, Fred Ridgeway as Father Ken Dillon, Noel Slattery as Father Rory Shanahan, Tony Guilfoyle as Father Larry Duff, Fidelma Meehan as Sister Monica, Larry O'Brien as Father Walton, Paddy Joyce, Declan Mulholland and Ultan Ely O'Carroll as Shouting Priests, Desmond Jordan as Posh Priest.
16	10	"Flight Into Terror"	Declan Lowney	Graham Linehan and Arthur Mathews	10 May 1996
A flight back from a pilgrimage runs out of fuel and there are only two parachutes. Meanwhile Jack discovers a supply of alcohol in the luggage compartment of the plane. Only one man can save the passengers... Guest stars (in order as credited): Paul Hickey as Father O'Shea, Patrick Duggan as Father Joe Briefly, Graham Norton as Father Noel Furlong, Jimmy Keogh as Father Fintan Fay, Gerard Murphy as Pilot, Liam O'Carroll as Priest with Sunglasses, Nick Wymer as Toilet Attendant, Jonathan White as Father Flynn, Graham Linehan as Father Gallagher, Kevin Gildea as Father Cave, Tony Guilfoyle as Father Larry Duff, Dave Dale as Big Nun.

=== Christmas Special (1996) ===
No. overall	No. in series	Title	Directed by	Written by	Original release date
17	—	"A Christmassy Ted"	Declan Lowney	Graham Linehan and Arthur Mathews	24 December 1996
Ted's quick thinking whilst lost in a department store's lingerie department earns him the coveted Golden Cleric award. So why doesn't he feel happy? Mrs Doyle's attempts to hang up the Christmas decorations become undone around her. She's also none too pleased at her Christmas present. Meanwhile, an "old friend" of Ted decides the time is ripe for a visit. When first shown, this hour-long episode attracted Channel 4's largest ever non-film audience viewing figures. Special guest star: Gerard McSorley as Father Todd Unctious. Guest stars (in order as credited): Dervla Kirwan as Assumpta, Stephen Tompkinson as Father Clifford, Tony Guilfoyle as Father Larry Duff, Anne Gildea as Woman with Baby, Caoilinn McCormack as Baby, Barry Murphy as Salesman, Seán Barrett as Father Fitzgerald, Donncha Crowley as Father Billy, Colum Gallivan as Father Reilly, Neil McCaul as Father Terry, Kevin McKidd as Father Deegan, Joe Taylor as Father Cleary, Andrew McCullough as Bishop Tom McCaskell, Billy Boyle and John O'Mahony as Chatback Priests, Ed Byrne and Tom Farrelly as Teenagers, Tony Rohr as Drunk Priest in Bar, John Delaney as Sat On Priest, Brendan F. Dempsey as Father Dick Mayo, Aine O'Connor as Sister Helen Locklear, Clive Geraghty as Fisherman, Brenda Burke, Miche Doherty, Stephen Kennedy, Conor Mullen, Pat O'Mahony and Paul Tylak as Award Ceremony Priests, John Quinn as Police Sergeant.

=== Series 3 (1998) ===
No. overall	No. in series	Title	Directed by	Written by	Original release date
18	1	"Are You Right There Father Ted?"	Andy De Emmony	Graham Linehan and Arthur Mathews	13 March 1998
Ted's "Chinaman" impression goes down badly with Craggy Island's Chinese community and he is branded a racist. In an attempt to prove he isn't a racist, Ted decides to hold a presentation on multiculturalism in Craggy Island to the Chinese. However, Ted's efforts to prove that he is not a racist are blighted by sheer bad luck. The title is a play on "Are Ye Right There Michael", a comic song by Percy French about the West Clare Railway. Guest stars (in order as credited): Patrick Kavanagh as Father Seamus Fitzpatrick, Vernon Dobtcheff as Old Nazi, Ozzie Yue as Mr. Yin, Peter Sakon-Lee as Son Yin, Eamon Rohan as Colm, Ann Callanan as Mrs. Carberry, Des Keogh as Older Dublin Priest, Simon Nelson as Younger Dublin Priest, Denis Quilligan as Parish Accountant, Frank Keane as Delivery Man, Royan Lee as man in Audience.
19	2	"Chirpy Burpy Cheap Sheep"	Andy De Emmony	Graham Linehan and Arthur Mathews	20 March 1998
Ted makes a large bet on the King of the Sheep competition. Unfortunately, Chris, his chosen sheep, has heard rumours about a sheep-eating beast and isn't feeling at all himself. The title is a pun on a 1970s bubblegum pop song, "Chirpy Chirpy Cheep Cheep". Guest stars (in order as credited): Peadar Lamb as Fargo Boyle, Peter Dineen as Giant Reid, Pat McGrath as Hud Hastings, Patrick Drury as John, Rynagh O'Grady as Mary, Eamon Rohan as Judge, Pricilla as Chris the Sheep.
20	3	"Speed 3"	Andy De Emmony	Graham Linehan and Arthur Mathews	27 March 1998
When Ted and Dougal expose a philandering milkman, Pat Mustard, he takes revenge on his replacement, Dougal, by putting a bomb on the milk float. If Dougal's speed drops below 4 mph, the bomb will explode, taking Dougal with it... the title and the whole episode is a parody of the film ‘Speed’. Guest stars (in order as credited): Pat Laffan as Pat Mustard, John Rogan as Mr. Fox, Eamon Morrissey as Father Beeching, Arthur Mathews as Father Clarke, Gail Fitzpatrick as Mrs. Millet.
21	4	"The Mainland"	Andy De Emmony	Graham Linehan and Arthur Mathews	3 April 1998
When Ted, Dougal, Jack and Mrs Doyle go on a trip to the mainland, all kinds of trouble ensues. Guest stars (in order as credited): Richard Wilson as himself, Graham Norton as Father Noel Furlong, Doreen Keogh as Mrs. Dineen, Mary Ann O'Donoghue as Optician, John Henderson as Tour Guide, Stephen Gallagher as Tony Lynch, Tom Farrelly as Gerry Fields, Yvonne Shanley as Janine Reilly, Sharon Carroll as Nuala Ryan, Richard Buss as AA Chairman, Conor Lovett as Ronald, Owen Kavanagh as First Policeman, John Macguire as Second Policeman, Anna Livia Ryan as Check-In Woman, Frank Murray as Waiter.
22	5	"Escape from Victory"	Andy De Emmony	Graham Linehan and Arthur Mathews	10 April 1998
Part 1 of 2. Ted takes great steps to ensure he wins a bet with Dick Byrne on the outcome of the All-Priests Over-75s Five-a-Side Football Championship. The title is a reference to the football movie Escape to Victory, about a football game played between prisoners of war and their guards in World War II. Guest stars (in order as credited): Maurice O'Donoghue as Father Dick Byrne, Don Wycherley as Father Cyril MacDuff, Stephen Brennan as Father Niall Haverty, Birdy Sweeney as Father Cullen, Charles Simon as Jim, Conor Evans as Father Romeo Sensini, Peter Dix as Craggy Island's Goalkeeper, Jason Byrne as Referee, Doreen Keogh as Mrs. Doyle's Friend, Miriam Kelly as Mrs. Doyle's Other Friend.
23	6	"Kicking Bishop Brennan Up the Arse"	Andy De Emmony	Graham Linehan and Arthur Mathews	17 April 1998
Part 2 of 2. The only episode to follow on directly from the previous one. Exposed as a cheat at the end of the previous episode, and with this episode's title as his forfeit, a terrified Ted tries to draw upon his courage to complete the deed. Guest stars (in order as credited): Jim Norton as Bishop Brennan, Ian Fitzgibbon as Father Jessup, Paul Tylak as Warrior, Sharon Devlin as Air Hostess, Aislinn Sands as Check-In Woman, Tim Dry as Aide in Vatican, Paul Woodfull as Taxi Driver.
24	7	"Night of the Nearly Dead"	Andy De Emmony	Graham Linehan and Arthur Mathews	24 April 1998
Thanks to Mrs. Doyle winning a poetry competition, young singer and TV presenter Eoin McLove pays a visit to Craggy Island, causing excitement for the island's ageing females, who besiege the Parochial House. The title is a pun on the movie Night of the Living Dead. McLove is a parody of Irish singer Daniel O'Donnell. Guest stars (in order as credited): Patrick McDonnell as Eoin McLove, Maria Doyle Kennedy as Patsy, Elva Crowley as Mrs. Boyle, Vincent Marzello as Television Psychiatrist, Maggie Shevlin as Mrs. Collins, Rosemary Kennedy as Mrs. Dunne.
25	8	"Going to America"	Andy De Emmony	Graham Linehan and Arthur Mathews	1 May 1998
Ted gets the opportunity of a lifetime, but can't bring himself to break it to the others that they're not invited. The title is a reference to the movie Coming to America. Musician and artist Brian Eno appears as "Father Brian Eno" at the "It's Great Being a Priest!" convention. The episode ends with a montage containing one clip from every previous episode, in reverse order. Guest stars (in order as credited): Tommy Tiernan as Father Kevin, Jeff Harding as Father Buzz Cagney, Hugh B. O'Brien as Eugene, Mark Doherty as Father Alan.

== Comic Relief ==
The annual telethon Comic Relief, aired on 14 March 1997, included a scene in which Ted and Dougal are enlisted to host the telethon. Ted is baffled as to why Comic Relief has selected two unknown Irish priests for the job. Dougal theorises that God planned the event as an opportunity for Ted to atone for stealing money from a charity. Ted decides God may forgive him if they succeed in raising the target sum of eight million pounds.

== Best episode ==
=== Most popular episodes ===
A 1999 poll conducted by the popular fansite The Craggy Island Examiner concluded that the best episodes were:

1. "A Song for Europe" (22%)

2. "Are You Right There Father Ted?" (19%)

3. "Good Luck, Father Ted and "Speed 3" (both 11%)

5. "Night of the Nearly Dead" (10%)

followed by:

- "The Old Grey Whistle Theft"
- "New Jack City"
- "The Plague"
- "Kicking Bishop Brennan Up the Arse"
- "Cigarettes and Alcohol and Rollerblading"

Notably, only one of these ten episodes was from Series 1 ("Good Luck, Father Ted").

=== Ted Fest 2007 ===
At the inaugural Ted Fest, "New Jack City" was voted best episode.

=== Father Ted Night 2011 (Channel 4) ===
Father Ted Night, broadcast on New Year's Day 2011 on Channel 4, named "Speed 3" as the fans' favourite episode. "Kicking Bishop Brennan Up the Arse" is named as the writers' favourite episode.
