= Cigarettes and Alcohol and Rollerblading =

- Father Ted episode
- Father Jack hallucinating a humanoid cigarette
- Episode no.: Series 2 Episode 8
- Directed by: Declan Lowney
- Written by: Graham Linehan; Arthur Mathews
- Cinematography by: Chris Owen
- Editing by: Mykola Pawluk; Tim Waddell
- Original air date: 26 April 1996

Guest appearances
- Maurice O'Donoghue as Father Dick Byrne; Patrick Drury as John; Rynagh O'Grady as Mary; Irene Warren as Singing Nun; Nuala Walsh as Sister Mary Gondola; Rosemary Henderson as Sister Assumpta; Tony Guilfoyle as Father Larry Duff; Don Wycherley as Father Cyril MacDuff; Chris Curran as Father Jim Johnson

Episode chronology
← Previous "Rock a Hula Ted"	Next → "New Jack City"

"Cigarettes and Alcohol and Rollerblading" is the eighth episode of the second series of Channel 4 sitcom Father Ted and the fourteenth episode overall.

== Synopsis ==
With Lent approaching, Ted receives a phone call from his rival, Father Dick Byrne, who says that he and his fellow priests on Rugged Island will be giving up their vices. Ted insists to his fellow Craggy Island priests that they must do the same: Ted will give up smoking cigarettes, Jack drinking alcohol, and Dougal his rollerblading. After they all find themselves sneaking out on the first night of Lent to partake in their vices, Ted decides they need help. With Mrs Doyle away on her Lenten pilgrimage, he calls up the Church-run addiction service, who says they will send someone to the island the next day. Jack becomes sober for the first time in twelve years, and is horrified to learn he is still on Craggy Island, implying he stays drunk so as to forget.

Sister Assumpta, a nun Ted and Dougal have met before, arrives the next day. She learns what their situation is and promises to help. Jack, upon seeing the nun, hurls himself through the window and flees into the countryside. The next day, Sister Assumpta wakes the priests at 5 a.m. with an air horn at an extremely close range of the Fathers and puts them through a grueling ordeal, which includes being given water for breakfast, spending a while outside in bathtubs of ice-cold water, being dragged behind a tractor, having objects thrown at them, being nearly fired at by her when they try to sneak carefully toward a table she is eating at, and being given Indian burns (which seems to affect Ted more than Dougal). By the time they go to bed, they discover Assumpta has even replaced their mattresses with bricks. To escape from the overzealous Sister, whose philosophy stems from the maniacal Matty Hislop, Ted and Dougal reluctantly go to Rugged Island's parochial house that night to see about staying with Dick Byrne. However, as they arrive and walk around the house, they see Dick and his fellow priests readily engaging in the activities Dick said they were giving up for Lent through the window, having lied to Ted about it.

Ted and Dougal return to Craggy Island, only to find that Assumpta had discovered a basket of chocolate eggs while they were away - her addiction of chocolate, upon her seeing the eggs while she is calling her associates, takes effect overnight, much to the surprise of Ted, when he makes the discovery on the morning he and Dougal return. Knowing that she should have resisted as part of her Lent observance, Ted agrees to forgive her for her indulgence by letting her redeem herself via overseeing the Rugged Island Fathers' Lent activities. Over the closing credits, she is later shown giving Dick, Cyril and Jim even more gruelling punishments that are far more horrific because they were not keeping their end of Dick's and Ted's contest.

Mrs Doyle subsequently returns from her Lenten pilgrimage, and upon entering the living room, she finds Ted, Dougal, and Jack overindulging in their vices more than ever - Ted is chain-smoking several cigarettes at once (to the point that the living room is full of smoke), Dougal is rollerblading indoors, and Jack is consuming alcohol both orally and intravenously.

== See also ==
- List of Easter television episodes
