= Tentacles of Doom =

- Father Ted episode
- Father Dougal (far right) and two visitors from the Vatican
- Episode no.: Series 2 Episode 3
- Directed by: Declan Lowney
- Written by: Graham Linehan; Arthur Mathews
- Cinematography by: Chris Owen
- Editing by: Mykola Pawluk; Tim Waddell
- Original air date: 22 March 1996

Guest appearances
- Malcolm Douglas and Mark O'Regan as 2 Vatican Priests; Kevin Moore as Bishop Eddie O'Neill; Denys Hawthorne as Bishop Facks; Paddy Ward as Bishop Jordan; Tony Guilfoyle as Father Larry Duff

Episode chronology
← Previous "Think Fast, Father Ted"	Next → "Old Grey Whistle Theft"

"Tentacles of Doom" is the third episode of the second series of Channel 4 sitcom Father Ted and the ninth episode overall.

== Synopsis ==
While Ted is trying to fix the plumbing in the Craggy Island parochial house, he receives news that the nearby Holy Stone of Clonrichert is being upgraded to a "class two relic" by the Vatican. Three bishops are being sent to perform the ceremony and will be staying in the parochial house, and Ted realises he needs to have both Dougal and Jack on their "best behaviour". Ted tells Dougal to keep to matters about the Church, while he trains Jack, with the promise of a drink, to speak simple replies to answer any question he may be asked, specifically "yes", and "that would be an ecumenical matter".

Bishops O'Neill, Facks, and Jordan arrive, and with Ted, Dougal, and Jack, they perform the ceremony without incident, and then they congregate into pairs. Dougal speaks with O'Neill, expressing his doubts about organised religion and the Catholic Church. Facks is enthusiastically impressed with Jack's "views" on the Church, and starts jabbing Jack with his finger to express his excitement. Jack is infuriated by this, and shoves the Holy Stone up Facks' rear end. At the parochial house, Ted excuses himself from Jordan to use the toilet, but as the plumbing is not yet fixed, Ted's flushes causes the water to erupt out over a drain in the yard that Jordan happens to be standing over. The elderly bishop has a heart attack and dies.

Later, Ted and Dougal watch the three bishops leave: O'Neill has taken to Dougal's words and has left the Church to become a hippie (asking that Dougal now call him "Eddie"), Facks is escorted in an ambulance to have the Holy Stone removed from his rectum, and a hearse drives away with Jordan's casket. When all have gone, Ted reflects on the visit, remarking: "Went pretty well, I thought".
