= The Plague (Father Ted) =

- Father Ted episode
- Bishop Brennan in bed with a rabbit
- Episode no.: Series 2 Episode 6
- Directed by: Declan Lowney
- Written by: Graham Linehan; Arthur Mathews
- Cinematography by: Chris Owen
- Editing by: Mykola Pawluk; Tim Waddell
- Original air date: 12 April 1996

Guest appearances
- James Rymer as Father Brendan; Arthur Mathews as Father Ben; David Heap as Mr Noonan; Jim Norton as Bishop Len Brennan; Paul Wonderful as Paddy Jordan; Pat Shortt as Tom

Episode chronology
| ← Previous "A Song for Europe" | Next → "Rock a Hula Ted" |

"The Plague" is the sixth episode of the second series of the Channel 4 sitcom Father Ted, and the twelfth episode overall. It is the second of three episodes featuring Jim Norton as Bishop Len Brennan.

== Synopsis ==
The episode begins with a pre-opening prologue scene in which a self-referential "Father Ted" mock title sequence is played, with "Ted" being replaced by "Ben" and the title's font also being slightly changed, which then cuts to Dougal sitting in front of the television shouting excitedly to Ted that the programme is starting. Each one comments on the spoof character representing themselves, Dougal saying that Brendan is "an eejit" and Ted making fun of Ben for being "a big thicko". The proper Father Ted titles follow.

The first scene, set at night, sees three people explore a forest-like setting; during the time of these events, a snap is heard from somewhere and the three people's flashlight looks for anything nearby - the light then comes upon a shocking sight resting among the trees: Jack, unconscious and with little or no clothing.

At the Parochial House, Dougal gets a pet rabbit which, after much deliberation, he calls Sampras, because of "that whole tennis-rabbit connection". Meanwhile, Jack has acquired a habit of sleepwalking naked, frightening a friend of Bishop Brennan, who demands a stop be put to this and arranges to visit the parochial house to inspect new security arrangements. Unfortunately, the Bishop has a fear of rabbits due to a bad experience he once had with some in a lift, which means Ted and Dougal must get Sampras out of the way before he visits. They fail, and the situation is exacerbated as more and more rabbits gradually appear in the Parochial House, apparently from nowhere.

Ted and Dougal then resort to desperate measures to hide the constantly growing number of rabbits, such as hiding them at the local greyhound track, trying to give them to their accident-prone friend Father Larry Duff (who now has twelve Rottweilers - after the call ends, Larry makes the unwise choice of reaching his arm out to one of his pets and the consequence is that he is chomped and gnashed at the moment the Rottweilers chomp on his reaching arm and pull him down to the floor out of the audience's sight) and getting Tom, the local psychopath, to look after them (rather than look after them in a proper sense, Tom would like to look after them in the sense of killing them, thinking about beheading them as his first choice), all to no avail. The Bishop soon arrives, and Ted shows him the security arrangements for Jack (which involve a cage and barbed wire around his bed and straitjacket pyjamas (that Ted claims are impossible to get off), as well as a tracking device and cameras). In the conversation, the Bishop notices a rabbit hutch filled with lettuce on the floor (Ted tells him that they grow lettuce indoors in a cage), rabbit droppings on the carpet (which Ted claims is caviar) and Mrs. Doyle walking in with water and lettuce (Ted takes the bowl, gulps the water and eats the lettuce), all of which prompt the Bishop to go to bed.

Ted then realises that Dougal left the rabbits in the spare bedroom, where Brennan is sleeping, but after distracting the Bishop, they discover that the rabbits are not there, suspecting they must have followed Jack into his room because of a scent they think Jack has that is attracting them. However, while Ted's back is turned, Jack circumvents the security measures and escapes, and the rabbits, as a result, follow. Ted notices a rabbit entering the spare bedroom, and he and Dougal tiptoe in to get the rabbits back out before the Bishop awakens and sees the rabbits.

Unfortunately for the Fathers, they are too late as the Bishop wakes up and turns on the light to find himself surrounded by rabbits, as well as a nude Jack next to him in his bed. Ted tells Brennan that it is just a "bad dream", and the Bishop lies back down to sleep (accompanied by Jack also lying back down), only to wake up again seconds later loudly screaming in horror (As the episode's before-end-credits final scene ends, the Bishop's loud, drawn-out scream echoes during both the shot of his scream and then the Parochial House itself), having realised what is happening.

== Reception ==
The episode's "sense of escalating misunderstanding and crisis", with the "tightly plotted farce" of regular characters hiding the true situation from a guest character, exemplfies the influence of Fawlty Towers on Father Ted writers Linehan and Mathews.
