= Ted Fest =

Fan convention celebrating the Irish television series Father Ted

- The Friends of Ted Festival, Craggy Island
- Genre: Comedy
- Dates: February, March
- Locations: Aran Islands, Galway Bay, Ireland; Parkes, New South Wales, Australia
- Years active: 2007 – present
- Website: www.tedfest.org

The Friends of Ted Festival, or Ted Fest, is an annual fan convention held on the island of Inishmore, off the coast of County Galway, Ireland for fans of the Channel 4 sitcom Father Ted, created by Graham Linehan and Arthur Mathews. The series was set on the fictional Craggy Island off Ireland's west coast, so Ted Fest is also held on such an island. In 2010 the festival expanded to an Australian edition, which was held in Parkes, New South Wales.

Events include, the Lovely Girl's competition, Ted's got talent, the Celibate Olympics, Mecca Bingo and many, many more.

== Festivals by year ==
=== 2007 ===
==== Events ====
A number of events took place at the festival, each themed in association with the comedy series.

- Best Episode - The best Father Ted episode was determined by those who attended this year's festival. The winner was "New Jack City".
- Father Jack Cocktail Evening
- Father Dougal Breakfast Movie Charades
- Lovely Girls Contest and Charity Auction (inspired by "Rock-a-Hula Ted")
- Crazy Golf (inspired by "Entertaining Father Stone")
- Hide A Nun and Seek
- Ludo Aerobics
- Buckaroo Speed Dating
- Ferrero Rocher Quiz Night

===== A Song for Europe =====
This is a parody of the episode "Song for Europe".

The 2007 Inis Mór Song for Europe is "Jack in the Box" by OK Chorale. Songwriters Peadar and Geordan joined the festival on Inis Mor on Sunday 25 February to record the song live accompanied by the Craggy Island Singers. According to the official website, the OK Chorale was formed following "a bizarre boating accident", in which "a skiff containing two Christy Moore impersonators, fleeing from an ugly scene at the Tory Island singing festival, became hopelessly lost and collided with a fishing boat entering Teelin Harbour. The ensuing brawl developed into a lengthy drinking session in the nearby Rusty Mackerel, where the men discovered their mutual enthusiasm for (a) The Eurovision Song Contest and (b) the music and legs of Clodagh Rodgers."

===== Toilet Duck Comedy Awards =====
This is a parody of the Golden Cleric award featured in "A Christmassy Ted".

On Wednesday 21 February at the Kings Head in County Galway eight of Ireland's up and coming comedians competed for a place in the final at Ted Fest 2007 on Inis Mór. The final took place in the Aran Islands Hotel on the Friday of the festival, attended by special guest Michael Redmond (the actor who played Father Stone from the series). The prize for the Kings Head Toilet Duck Award is €1,000, an appearance at the Cork Comedy Festival and a golden duck. The 2007 winner was Sharon Mannion and the 2008 winner was Bob Hennigan. The winner in 2010 was Gerry McBride.

===== Football match =====
This is a parody of the "All-Priests Five-a-Side Over-75's Indoor Football Challenge Match" featured in the episode "Escape from Victory".

A football match between the two islands to commemorate the game that featured in the series. Former Republic of Ireland footballers Tony Cascarino and John Aldridge were opposing captains, whilst celebrity referee Pierluigi Collina sailed to Inis Mór to referee the one-off tie. The match took place on the beach on the final day of the festival. The winning island side, (Inis Mór by 2–0) was declared "The Real Craggy Island" for the coming year. Inis Oirr received the title of "Rugged Island". The captains on the day were Padraig Ó Flaithearta (Inis Mor) and Mairtin Seoighe (Inis Oirr), and the goalscorers were Adam Clark and Cillian Joyce.

=== 2008 ===
Ted Fest 2008 featured separate events on the island of Inishmore and on the mainland at Kilfenora, County Clare (site of Parochial House external shots in the series). The Craggy Island World Cup was expanded to admit all islands of Ireland.

=== 2009 ===
The third Ted Fest was spread over two weekends. The Pink Flamingos took the third Craggy Cup (non-island teams being permitted for the first time), while, in a bizarre coincidence, the Toilet Duck Comedy Award was won by a genuine ex-priest named FJ Murray.

=== 2010 ===
Tickets for the fourth Ted Fest went on sale in September 2009. The first weekend took place on Inishmore and the second on Inisheer. A parallel Ted Fest Oz took place in Parkes, New South Wales, Australia during the Easter Triduum, however it was not a success, the local police removing its liquor licence due to noise levels.

=== 2011 ===
The fifth Ted Fest took place on Inishmore from 24 to 27 February 2011. Scheduled events include a Lovely Girls pageant, "Ted's Got Talent" (a parody of Britain's Got Talent), the Ronnie Drew Hour, a Virtual Confession Box, a Craggy Island Kill Bill Festival, the Father Ted Prizeless Quiz, the Craggy Cup, "Matchmaking with Nellie," a Pirate Cruise and a walking tour to the Amish community.

Ted Fest V also featured a video blog by one of Dermot Morgan's sons, Rob Morgan, which gave an Access All Areas look at some of the many events at Ted Fest.

=== 2012 ===
The sixth Ted Fest once again took place on Inishmore in February 2012.

=== 2013 ===
In 2013 the festival was held on 21–24 February.

=== 2014 ===
2014 saw the first TedFest held in London.

=== 2015 ===
TedFest 9 took place Thursday 26 February 2015 to Sunday 1 March 2015.

=== 2019 ===
The 2019 festival took place at Inis Mór on 23–24 February.

=== 2020 ===
The 2020 TedFest took place on 21 February.

=== 2021 ===
The 13th TedFest took place on 3–6 March 2022.

=== 2023 ===
The 2023 TedFest was held on 2–5 March 2023 at Inis Mór.

=== 2024 ===
The 2024 Tedfest took place on 7–10 March at the Aran Islands hotel in Inis Mór.

=== 2025 ===
The 2025 festival took place Thursday 6 to Sunday 9 March 2025.

== Festival summary ==
Year	Date(s)	Craggy Cup Final	Toilet Duck Comedy Award	Lovely Girl
2007	23 – 25 February	Inishmore 2–0 Inisheer	Sharon Mannion	Agnes
2008	25 February – 2 March	Inishbofin (County Galway) 4–3 Inishmore	Bob Hennigan	Tara Kilbane
2009	26 February – 1 March; 5 – 8 February	The Pink Flamingos ?–? Aran Islands Hotel Barmaids (The Pink Flamingos won on tiebreak)	FJ Murray	Sarah Gallagher
2010	25 – 28 February; 4 – 7 March; Ted Fest Oz: 2 – 5 April	Winners: Inishmore		Weekend 1: Aoife Keegan; Weekend 2: Paula
2011	24 – 27 February		Edwin Sammon	Majella Donoghue
2012	23 – 26 February			
2013	21 – 24 February			
2014	27 February – 2 March			
2015	26 February - 1 March			
2019	23–24 February			
2020	21 – 25 February			
2022	3 – 5 March			
2023	2 – 5 March			
2024	7–10 March			
2025	6 – 9 March			
