= New Jack City (Father Ted) =

- Father Ted episode
- Father Stack blasts jungle music.
- Episode no.: Series 2 Episode 9
- Directed by: Declan Lowney
- Written by: Graham Linehan, Arthur Mathews
- Original air date: 3 May 1996

Guest appearances
- Brendan Grace as Fr Fintan Stack; Tony Guilfoyle as Fr. Larry Duff; Paddy Joyce as Father Billy; Declan Mulholland as Father Michael

Episode chronology
← Previous "Cigarettes and Alcohol and Rollerblading"	Next → "Flight Into Terror"

"New Jack City" is the ninth episode of the second series of the Channel 4 television sitcom Father Ted.

At the inaugural Ted Fest in February 2007, it was voted the best Father Ted episode.

== Synopsis ==
Father Jack contracts "hairy hands syndrome" and is sent to St. Clabbert's Hospital for wayward priests (jokingly referred to as "Jurassic Park" by the Clergymen of Craggy Island, after the film of the same title). He is visibly alarmed upon learning from Ted that he will be going to "Jurassic Park", and tries to escape by riding on a lawnmower, but to no avail.

A new priest replaces Jack while he is on leave: Father Fintan Stack, an obnoxious, rude and destructive priest, who torments Ted and Dougal. Stack's torments include deliberately driving Ted's car into a wall, insulting Ted and his friends in the priesthood, getting Dougal drunk on Jack's whiskey, drilling unnecessary holes in the living room wall, and blasting jungle music (Cutty Ranks’ "Limb By Limb") at three o'clock in the morning.

Fed up with Stack, Ted and Dougal kidnap Father Jack back from St. Clabbert's Hospital, which is full of elderly priests with a similar demeanour to Jack (except for one who says "I really shouldn't be here"). Jack returns to the parochial house with Ted and Dougal, desperate for a drink. He is furious when he finds out that his booze stash is gone and prepares to punch Stack out for going after his whiskey, but stops himself after noticing that Stack has caught the hairy hands syndrome from sitting in Jack's chair, which Dougal forgot to disinfect before Stack arrived. Stack is sent to St. Clabbert's Hospital and everything in the parochial house returns to normal, though Jack is locked in a hermetically sealed chamber to prevent him from passing the hairy hands syndrome on to anyone else, which Ted considers an improvement.

Meanwhile, at St. Clabbert's, Father Stack still insists on playing his jungle music, distracting the other residents.

== Production ==
Pat Laffan auditioned for the role of Father Stack. He later appeared as the villainous milkman Pat Mustard in "Speed 3", in the third series. Fr. Stack's jungle music is Limb By Limb (DJ SS Remix) by Cutty Ranks and The Way (The VIP Mix) by DJ Taktix. The episode was named after the film New Jack City. Mrs. Doyle parodies the opening scene of Dont Look Back, a 1967 documentary film by D. A. Pennebaker that principally covers Bob Dylan's 1965 concert tour of the United Kingdom.
