= Flight Into Terror =

- Father Ted episode
- Father Ted (left) and Father Dougal (right) on a plane
- Episode no.: Series 2 Episode 10
- Directed by: Declan Lowney
- Written by: Graham Linehan, Arthur Mathews
- Original air date: 10 May 1996

Guest appearances
- Graham Norton as Fr. Noel Furlong; Tony Guilfoyle as Fr. Larry Duff; Kevin Gildea as Fr. Cave; Graham Linehan as Father Gallagher; Patrick Duggan as Fr. Joe Briefly; Gerard Murphy as Pilot

Episode chronology
| ← Previous "New Jack City" | Next → "A Christmassy Ted" |

"Flight Into Terror" is the 10th episode of the second series of Channel 4 sitcom Father Ted, and the 16th episode overall.

== Synopsis ==
The three Craggy Island priests are on a plane with a party of other priests and nuns, returning to Ireland from a pilgrimage to a golf course where the Blessed Virgin Mary has appeared. Ted and Dougal share their tacky souvenirs, which include a talking tape dispenser that tells one how much tape they used. As the plane takes off, Ted notes his fear of flying.

Dougal is invited to come to see the cockpit with Father Noel Furlong and Father Fintan Fay, who behaves as a monkey. In the cockpit, Dougal is enticed by a big red button that says "Do Not Press", and only accidentally presses it when instructed to press the adjacent one when Noel is trying to calm down Fintan. This causes the plane to start dumping fuel. Dougal tells Ted there is a problem with the plane and that it is going to crash, and that there are only two parachutes aboard. Ted talks to the pilot, who agrees they should not tell the other passengers this and take calm steps to resolve the situation. They press the "emergency" button which causes sirens and warnings about the pending crash in the passenger cabin.

Ted takes control and tells the priests that they should all write a 200-word essay on why they should get one of the two parachutes. As they are all distracted by writing and then evaluating the essays, Jack takes the parachutes, using one for himself and another for a drink cart and jumps out of the plane.

The pilot realises they can prevent the crash if someone can fix the line between the plane's reserve fuel tank and engines; but he does not believe there are any repair materials on board. Ted proudly shows the tape dispenser that Dougal got, and with his nerves steadied by the emergency, climbs out of the landing gear opening and successfully patches up the line with the tape. The pilot announces that the plane is saved, and the situation is returned to normal...at which Ted's nerves immediately come back, and he realises with horror that he is hanging precariously outside the plane by the landing gear.

Later, at the Craggy Island parochial house, there is still no sign of Jack, and Dougal and Mrs Doyle are worried about Ted's condition - he has yet to give up his terrified grip on the landing gear, which has been removed from the plane brought to the house.

Elsewhere, Jack is shown hanging from a tree by the parachute traps, the drink cart hanging nearby and just out of Jack's reach. He shouts and wails loudly in frustration as he struggles to reach the alcohol.
