= Rock a Hula Ted =

- Father Ted episode
- The Lovely Girls competition
- Episode no.: Series 2 Episode 7
- Directed by: Declan Lowney
- Written by: Graham Linehan; Arthur Mathews
- Cinematography by: Chris Owen
- Editing by: Mykola Pawluk; Tim Waddell
- Original air date: 19 April 1996

Guest appearances
- C. P. Grogan as Niamh Connolly; Alan Shortt as an Interviewer; Maggie Conway as a Deaf Signer; Dermot Crowley as Father Liam Deliverance; Eddie Bannon, Joe Gallagher, Mick Nolan and Joe Taylor as The Lads; Dawn Bradfield as Imelda

Episode chronology
← Previous "The Plague"	Next → "Cigarettes and Alcohol and Rollerblading"

"Rock a Hula Ted" is the seventh episode of the second series of Channel 4 sitcom Father Ted, and the thirteenth episode overall.

== Synopsis ==
Ted and Dougal see feminist musician Niamh Connolly (played by Scottish singer Clare Grogan) – a thinly veiled parody of Sinéad O'Connor – on the television, accusing the Catholic Church of multiple atrocious but highly improbable acts during the Great Famine, such as shutting the "potato factories" and turning them into children's prisons. She then sings a radically feminist, anti-clerical song ("Big men in frocks / Tellin' us what to do / They can't get pregnant like I do") with the lyrics signed for TV viewers. Ted and Dougal loudly dismiss all of this. Meanwhile, Mrs Doyle declares that the Church has always been good to her, while she is preoccupied with various heavy labour tasks around the parochial house in addition to her regular housework, as the men relax in front of the television.

Ted is asked to be a judge in the Lovely Girls competition, and Jack comes along for the day. Due to Jack's atypical long hair, he resembles Bob Geldof and proceeds to imitate him by beginning a collection for Live Aid – any proceeds going directly to Jack himself. When Ted finds out, he tells off Jack asking, "What would Queen think, and Peter Gabriel and all those acts who were on earlier in the day? And what about Phil Collins flying all the way from Boston?", prompting a vicious punch in the stomach by Jack.

This results in Ted showing up at the contest breathing heavily as he welcomes the girls. The contest revolves around various self-parodying imitations of typical events (sandwich construction, walking, laughing) with Imelda ultimately deemed the winner by Ted. Her prize is a meal with Ted in Craggy Island's top seafood Thai restaurant, The Thai Cottage, out of her own wallet.

While Ted is out, Niamh Connolly comes to visit. Dougal invites her in and (technically following some advice Ted gave him) asks her if she would like to remove her bra, even offering to make tea while she takes her bra off. He then attempts to make a cup of tea for her but concedes defeat with Mrs Doyle busy elsewhere.

When Ted returns, he is dismayed to discover that Dougal has managed to sign over the parochial house to Niamh behind his back. Niamh asks Ted and Dougal to leave; this is further strongly encouraged by her two bodyguards. Spending the night in a tent outside the house, Ted asked Dougal how he let this happen. Dougal says he was following Ted's instructions about dealing with women: He had tried to talk about clothes and make her comfortable (by asking her to remove her bra) and he had given her what she had wanted (the house). Ted leaves a pen and notebook outside the tent, in the hope that God will write the answer to their problem overnight.

As expected, this does not happen, so Ted returns to the house and negotiates with Niamh. Just as he is telling her about the "good work" that goes on in the parish, another priest comes in, asking Ted which dress he prefers out of two he has in his arms. Niamh does not know the dresses are for Imelda, and thinks the priest is going to wear them himself. Ted says the dresses are both equally good, and after the priest gratefully departs, he tells Niamh that Craggy Island is a place where priests who lead all sorts of lifestyles can live free from hypocrisy and intolerance.

A noise is heard upstairs, and Jack comes barging into the room. He sees Niamh and yells "Woman!" before Ted pushes him out of the room and hastily attempts to disguise this sudden intrusion as "Father Billy" expressing his positive views on women priests. Jack is seen at the window behind Niamh leering lustily at her. Imploring Niamh to return the house, Ted makes the mistake of saying he is a huge fan who has all her records; she agrees to give him back the house as soon as she has signed all the records.

Niamh Connolly on Craggy Island

Ted rushes off to John and Mary's shop where he luckily finds most of her discography. Whilst Niamh is signing them, an exhausted Mrs Doyle appears saying that she has finished with the pipes and she will get on with the rest of her chores, even though she is visibly worn out. Ted interrupts in an attempt to save the day but is hit across the chest by the pile of records thrown by Niamh.

The next scene shows Imelda, Niamh and Mrs Doyle dining in the Thai restaurant. Mrs Doyle is agitated about having left the priests home alone, but Niamh urges her to enjoy herself. She reveals she has returned the house to Ted and Dougal in return for Mrs Doyle having one night off every week and urges the other two to relax and enjoy themselves as there are "no men around, sisters, we can do as we like." However, as Mrs Doyle nervously attempts to use her chopsticks to pick up a bite of food, Niamh suddenly erupts in fury, screaming "Is that meat??!" Mrs. Doyle is utterly discomfited. Imelda inquires with bafflement, "Do I still have to pay for this?"

The credits roll and Ted and Dougal are shown in the kitchen struggling to put out a fire which has broken out. Ted screams, "I just want a cup of tea!" and the pair break down in tears.
