= Escape from Victory =

- Father Ted episode
- Dougal “trains” for the big match
- Episode no.: Series 3 Episode 5
- Directed by: Andy DeEmmony
- Written by: Graham Linehan, Arthur Mathews
- Original air date: 10 April 1998

Guest appearances
- Maurice O'Donoghue as Father Dick Byrne; Don Wycherley as Father Cyril MacDuff; Jason Byrne as Referee; Birdy Sweeney as Father Cullen; Stephen Brennan as Father Niall Haverty

Episode chronology
| ← Previous "The Mainland" | Next → "Kicking Bishop Brennan Up the Arse" |

"Escape from Victory" is the fifth episode of the third series of Channel 4 sitcom Father Ted and the 22nd episode overall. It is the first of two episodes that form a linked narrative, ending with "Kicking Bishop Brennan Up the Arse".

== Synopsis ==
Ted is panicking over the upcoming "All-Priests five-a-side Over-75s Indoor Challenge Football Match" between teams from Craggy Island and Rugged Island, which will be led by his rival Father Dick Byrne. Ted fears the parochial house has been bugged by Dick to overhear his plans, and has been losing sleep, forcing him to drink "Dreamy Sleepy Nightie Snoozy Snooze", an alcoholic sleeping aid which is banned in most European countries. Ted explains to Dougal that he and Dick have a forfeit system, so that the priest of the losing team must do an embarrassing challenge set forth by the other.

Ted starts practicing with his team, but notices that both star players, Jack and his strike partner, Father Nick, are missing. He discovers that Nick has just died. While paying condolences to Fr. Niall Haverty, Ted observes the expensive coffin that Niall bought for Nick, as well as a pair of fake hands and a remote-controlled wheelchair, and classes these as impulse buys that would only be of use in a "completely ludicrous situation". Ted later finds that Jack has been asleep for 14 days, which is unusual even for Jack, and is alarmed to find out that Jack drank the entire bottle of "Dreamy Sleepy Nightie Snoozy Snooze".

On the day of the match, Jack still has not woken up. Worse, Dick has brought Fr. Romeo Sensini, a rather fit senior compared to all the other players, for Rugged Island. Ted laments that he is stuck in a "completely ludicrous situation", when inspiration hits. He gets Niall's wheelchair to use to move the unconscious Jack on the floor, while using the fake hands to hide the remote that he is holding. Despite Romeo's abilities, Jack "leads" the team to a 2-1 victory over Rugged Island. As Ted celebrates with the others and announces Dick's forfeit - to kiss Father Cyril on the cheek to play on Dick's homophobia - the referee comes in and notices Ted's fake hands, due to Ted being unable to take a glass of champagne. He immediately discovers Ted's deception, and the Craggy Island victory is annulled.

Some time later, Ted gets a letter from Dick with a forfeit for cheating at the match. He is horrified to learn that he has to "kick Bishop Brennan up the arse". When Ted reads the forfeit out loud, Dougal faints from the shock, Mrs Doyle drops her teapot and Jack wakes up immediately.
