= The Mainland (Father Ted) =

- Father Ted episode
- Episode no.: Series 3 Episode 4
- Directed by: Andy DeEmmony
- Written by: Graham Linehan, Arthur Mathews
- Original air date: 3 April 1998

Guest appearances
- Graham Norton as Father Noel Furlong; Richard Wilson as himself

Episode chronology
← Previous "Speed 3"	Next → "Escape from Victory"

"The Mainland" is the fourth episode of the third series of the Channel 4 sitcom Father Ted and the 21st episode overall. It was first broadcast on 3 April 1998.

== Synopsis ==
Ted, Dougal, Jack, and Mrs. Doyle depart Craggy Island for the mainland for various reasons; Ted plans to collect £200 he won in a bet, and then visit the "Very Dark Caves" with Dougal, Mrs. Doyle plans to meet with her friend Mrs. Dineen to have tea, and Jack needs to go to the optician to get a new pair of glasses, after his last pair was stolen by a crow.

After dropping Mrs. Doyle and Jack off, Ted and Dougal go to the caves. Ted is surprised to see Richard Wilson, from the sitcom One Foot in the Grave, waiting outside, and goes up to greet him with his catchphrase "I don't believe it!". Wilson, who is sick of hearing the phrase himself, physically attacks Ted before others physically drag him away. Ted and Dougal proceed into the caves with a tour group. When Ted utters "I don't believe it!" in awe of a rock formation, he encounters Wilson again, and he and Dougal flee deeper into the caves, getting lost. The cave guide apologises to Wilson, who says that it's all right, as long as he does not have to hear "that bloody catchphrase" again. The cave guide then has to resist the urge to blurt it out.

Ted and Dougal end up finding Father Noel Furlong and the St. Luke's Youth Group deeper within, having been lost there for two days. After Noel decides to have a screeching competition and is buried under a pile of falling rocks (while the Youth Group members leave and board flights to Paraguay), Ted and Dougal continue on their own. Ted eventually discovers that Dougal's tank top has come unravelled, and realises that the thread will provide a way out, but after inadvertently winding it all up in the excitement, he again exclaims "I don't believe it!", his words echoing to Wilson, who starts to lose his sanity. On their way out, they tell a passing binman about Noel's plight, unaware he is not a cave guide.

At the optician, Jack gets a new pair of glasses, only to immediately lose them to a crow again as he leaves. Wandering, he comes across a sign for an Alcoholics Anonymous meeting, mistaking it for a bar (due to only reading the word "drink"). The attendees fail to understand the nature of Jack's relationship with alcohol, and interpret his wild shouts of "Drink!" as a plea for help.

At the tea room, Mrs. Doyle and Mrs. Dineen have a great time reminiscing, but when the bill arrives, neither will let the other pay for their meal. They begin fighting, leading to both being arrested. Jack, meanwhile, enters a pub, but as he orders a drink, one of the attendees from the Alcoholics Anonymous meeting sees him and tries to stop him. Jack punches him out (off-screen), leading to him being taken away in an ambulance; Jack is then also arrested.

Ted and Dougal arrive at the police station, where they are told either to pay £200, or the two would have to stay in jail overnight. Ted is initially ready to let them stay, but when Dougal tries to get his attention, loses his temper and pays the money he won in the bet. He then lays into Dougal for making him pay the money and embarrassing him, only for Dougal to respond that he forgot about the money and was trying to tell Ted the zipper on his trousers was down. They return to Craggy Island, with Ted vowing never to go to the mainland again.

Sometime later, Wilson is bike-riding across Craggy Island, and gets lost. He goes to the parochial house to get directions. Ted answers the door, and Wilson, shocked to see Ted yet again, utters "I don't believe it!"

== Casting ==
- Richard Wilson makes a special guest appearance as himself, with Ted and Dougal recognising him as "your man from One Foot in the Grave". In the episode, every time Ted says, "I don't believe it", Wilson becomes very angry (to the point where he violently attacks Ted). This is a reference to the fact that Wilson really does hate people going up to him and saying his catchphrase from One Foot in the Grave and only performs the line for charity events. The situation was conceived when Father Ted writers Graham Linehan and Arthur Mathews sat behind Wilson at a performance of Cirque du Soleil at the Royal Albert Hall. They considered how "tasteless and wrong" it would be to lean forward to him every time that an acrobat did a stunt and yell the catchphrase, and then they realised that that is exactly what their fictional priests would do.
- Graham Norton returns for his third and final appearance as Father Noel Furlong. He sings the Queen songs "Bohemian Rhapsody" and, at the very end of the episode, "Fat Bottomed Girls".
- Art director Bill Crutcher appears in a cameo as the smoking bin man.
