= New Jack City (disambiguation) =

New Jack City is a 1991 American film directed by Mario Van Peebles.

New Jack City may also refer to:

- Music from the Motion Picture New Jack City, the film's soundtrack album
  - "New Jack City", the album's title track performed by R&B group Guy
- "New Jack City", an episode of the television series Father Ted
- "New Jack City", an episode of the television series Kickin' It
- "New Jack City", a song by DJ Kay Slay from the album The Streetsweeper, Vol. 1
