= Are You Right There Father Ted? =

- Father Ted episode
- Ted gestures behind a perfectly square bit of black dirt on the window
- Episode no.: Series 3 Episode 1
- Directed by: Andy DeEmmony
- Written by: Graham Linehan; Arthur Mathews
- Original air date: 13 March 1998

Guest appearances
- Patrick Kavanagh as Fr Seamus Fitzpatrick, Ozzie Yue as Sean Yin, Vernon Dobtcheff as an Old Nazi, Peter Sakon Lee as Sean Yin's son, Ann Callanan as Mrs. Carberry, Eamon Rohan as Colm, Des Keogh as Older Priest, Simon Nelson as Younger Priest; Denis Quilligan as an Accountant, Frank Keane as Delivery Man, Royan Lee as Man in Audience

Episode chronology
← Previous "A Christmassy Ted"	Next → "Chirpy Burpy Cheap Sheep"

"Are You Right There Father Ted?" is the first episode of the third series of the Channel 4 television sitcom Father Ted, and the 18th episode overall. It is notable for being the first episode aired after the death of Dermot Morgan, who had died the day after filming for the final episode had been completed. As a mark of respect to Morgan, the original transmission of the first episode was delayed by a week.

== Plot ==
In the cold opening, Ted has been promoted to a luxurious Dublin parish, involving trips to Paris, games of Tennis and pheasant dinners. However, a church accountant soon asks Ted about a discrepancy with the church expenses. Ted is subsequently sent back to Craggy Island.

Ted goes to collect a copy of a book he had given to Father Seamus Fitzpatrick, and surprised to see his collection of Nazi and Third Reich memorabilia, including a live Nazi veteran. Returning to the parish, Ted sees Mrs. Doyle fall off the roof and injure her back, so he and Dougal are required to take over the cleaning duties. The two become quickly bored, and to pass the time, Ted puts a lampshade on his head (giving the appearance of an Asian farmer's hat) and does an offensive impression of a Chinese person, only to then turn around to see the Yins, a local family of Chinese descent living on the island, watching him from outside, who quickly leave in disgust. Dougal tells Ted about the Chinatown on Craggy Island and its according inhabitants, which Ted did not previously know about. Ted runs after the Yin family to provide an excuse for his actions as they are about to leave, only for them to drive around him. He later leaves the house again to go shopping and discovers that rumours that he is a racist are spreading across the island.

Ted tries to disprove the rumours but his explanations are either rejected or hampered by bad luck. At one point, Ted stands at the window, which has a perfectly square black piece of dirt on it, and waves to the Yin family, whom he invited round to convince them that he is not a racist. However, from outside, the dirt makes Ted appear to have a toothbrush moustache similar to Adolf Hitler's, and his gestures appear similar to Hitler's. The Yins leave, angering Ted.

Ted decides the only way to put things right is to hold a celebration of the diversity of Craggy Island at a local pub. While his laughable presentation is ridiculed, the Yins accept his apology due to the free alcohol provided afterwards. Meanwhile, Father Fitzpatrick has died suddenly (after accidentally ingesting cyanide instead of Valium) and left his collection of Nazi memorabilia to Ted via mail, which Mrs. Doyle unpacks. After the bar closes, Ted invites the Yins for a nightcap at the parochial house, only to discover that Mrs Doyle put the entire collection of Nazi memorabilia on full display in the living room. Ted says that he can explain everything, only to then realise that actually, he cannot.

The next day, Ted calls the Yin family to tell them about a large package of whiskey that he sent them as a further apology, but says that there has been a "change of plan". Father Jack then emerges from the box in an SS uniform, having drunk all of the liquor.

== Commentary ==
In the book Father Ted: The Complete Scripts, Arthur Mathews observes that the islanders' actions in this episode are the opposite of those in "The Passion of Saint Tibulus": in the earlier episode, they completely fail to do what Ted wants them to, while in this episode they enthusiastically follow what they imagine to be Ted's example, even though he desperately wants them not to.

== See also ==
- Are Ye Right There Michael, a humorous song by the 19th-century and early 20th-century Irish composer and musician Percy French
