= Time Will Tell (film) =

1992 documentary directed by Declan Lowney

- Directed by: Declan Lowney
- Produced by: Rocky Oldham
- Edited by: Peter Bensimon; Tim Thornton-Allan
- Production company: Island Pictures
- Distributed by: Action Gitanes; IRS Media
- Release date: 28 May 1992; (USA)
- Running time: 85 minutes (1h25)
- Country: United Kingdom
- Language: English

Time Will Tell, is a 1992 British documentary biographical drama film directed by Declan Lowney and produced by Rocky Oldham for Island Pictures. The film based on the life story of Bob Marley, who popularized reggae music outside Jamaica.

The film made its premier on 28 May 1992 in the United States. The film received mixed reviews from critics.
