= Vernon Dobtcheff =

French-British actor (born 1934)

- Born: Vernon Alexandre Dobtcheff; 14 August 1934 (age 92); Nîmes, Occitania, France
- Education: Ascham St Vincent's School; Eastbourne College
- Occupation: Actor
- Years active: 1959–2023

Vernon Alexandre Dobtcheff (born 14 August 1934) is a French-British character actor. He has appeared in over 400 film, television, and stage productions in a career spanning six decades.

== Early life and education ==
Dobtcheff was born in Nîmes, France, to Russian parents. His family emigrated to Sussex, England prior to the outbreak of World War II. He attended Ascham St Vincent's School in Eastbourne, where he won the Acting Cup, and Eastbourne College.

== Career ==
Dobtcheff made his professional stage debut with the Colchester Repertory Company in 1960. Later that year, he joined the repertory company of The Old Vic, first appearing in Franco Zeffirelli's production of Romeo and Juliet. In 1965, he starred in the debut production of John Osborne's A Patriot for Me. In 1967, he played the Presiding Judge in The Man in the Glass Booth at the Royal Court Theatre.

His debut film role was in Those Magnificent Men in Their Flying Machines (1965). He has since appeared in dozens of films, usually in character parts, including The Taming of the Shrew (1967), Fiddler on the Roof (1971), The Day of the Jackal (1973), Murder on the Orient Express (1974), The Spy Who Loved Me (1977), Indiana Jones and the Last Crusade (1989), and Before Sunset (2004).

Among his many other television roles was as the Chief Scientist in the Doctor Who serial The War Games in 1969, in which he portrayed the first character ever to mention the Time Lords by name. In 1967 he was in The Avengers episode entitled "The Living Dead". He appeared in the Blake's 7 episode "Shadow" as the Chairman of the Terra Nostra in 1979. He has appeared in the Doctor Who audio drama The Children of Seth in which he plays the role of Shamur.

In his 2006 memoir, Red Carpets and Other Banana Skins, British actor Rupert Everett describes an encounter with Dobtcheff on the boat train to Paris, and reveals his extraordinary reputation as the "patron saint" of the acting profession, stating that Dobtcheff "was legendary not so much for his acting as for his magical ability to catch every first night in the country".

== Stage credits ==
Year	Title	Role(s)	Venue
1960	The Country Wife	Mr Pinchwife	Mercury Theatre, Colchester
1960	The Unexpected Guest	Henry Angell	Mercury Theatre, Colchester
1960	One More River	Finch	Mercury Theatre, Colchester
1960	Twelfth Night	Malvolio	Mercury Theatre, Colchester
1960	Thark	Lionel Frush	Mercury Theatre, Colchester
1960	The Late Christopher Bean	Rosen	Mercury Theatre, Colchester
1960	How Say You?	George Lockwood	Mercury Theatre, Colchester
1960	The Apple Cart	Crassus	Mercury Theatre, Colchester
1960	The Pleasure of His Company	Jim Dougherty	Marlowe Theatre, Canterbury
1960	Romeo and Juliet	Apothecary, Ensemble member	The Old Vic
1960	Mary Stuart	Officer of the Queen's Guard	The Old Vic
1960-61	She Stoops to Conquer		The Old Vic
1960-61	A Midsummer Night's Dream		The Old Vic
1961	Henry IV, Part 1	Ensemble member	The Old Vic
1961	The White Devil	Cardinal Monticelso	The Old Vic
1961	Twelfth Night	Valentine	The Old Vic
1961	Mourning Becomes Electra	Abner Small	The Old Vic
1961	Mourning Becomes Electra	Abner Small	The Old Vic & UK tour
1961	Mourning Becomes Electra	Abner Small	The Old Vic
1961-62	Mourning Becomes Electra	Abner Small	The Old Vic
1961-62	King John		The Old Vic
1961-62	Doctor Faustus		The Old Vic
1961-62	Macbeth	English Doctor, Ensemble member	The Old Vic
1962	The Shoemaker's Holiday		The Old Vic
1962-63	Three Sisters	Ivan Chebutykin	The Old Vic
1962-63	Othello		The Old Vic
1962-63	The Merchant of Venice		The Old Vic
1962-63	Measure for Measure		The Old Vic
1962-63	Peer Gynt	M. Ballon, Strange Passenger	The Old Vic
1965	The Game as Played		Arts Theatre
1965	A Patriot for Me	Dr Schoepfer, Deputy	Royal Court Theatre
1965-66	A Lily in Little India	Gardening Expert	St Martin's Theatre
1965-66	A Lily in Little India	Gardening Expert	Hampstead Theatre
1967	The Man in the Glass Booth	Presiding Judge	St Martin's Theatre
1969	A Doll's House	Dr Rank	Watford Palace Theatre
1969	The Boys in the Band		Théâtre Édouard VII, Paris
1970	Three Sisters		Théâtre des Célestins, Lyon
1973	Three Sisters	Fyodor Kulygin	Greenwich Theatre
1976	L'Homme de cendres		Vaison-la-Romaine Festival
1977	Julius Caesar	Cinna, Citizen of Rome, Soothsayer, Poet	Chichester Festival Theatre
1977-78	The Apple Cart	Pliny	Chichester Festival Theatre
1988	The Tutor	Wenzeslaus	The Old Vic
1997	Cerceau	Nikolai "Koka" Lvovitch	Orange Tree Theatre
2013	King Lear	Curan, Gentleman, Doctor	The Old Vic
2013	King Lear	Curan, Gentleman, Doctor	St James Theatre

== Partial filmography ==
- Those Magnificent Men in Their Flying Machines (1965) as French Team Member (uncredited)
- Darling (1965) as Art Critic (uncredited)
- Return from the Ashes (1965) as Man breaking up nightclub fight (uncredited)
- The Idol (1966) as Man at Party
- The Taming of the Shrew (1967) as Pedant
- A Dandy in Aspic (1968) as Stein
- The Tyrant King (1968) as M.Le Coq
- Baby Love (1969) as Man in Cinema
- The Assassination Bureau (1969) as Baron Muntzof
- Anne of the Thousand Days (1969) as Mendoza
- Doctor Who (1969) as The Scientist (The War Games)
- Darling Lili (1970) as Otto Kraus
- The Beast in the Cellar (1970) as Sir Bernard Newsmith
- Les mariés de l'an II (1971) as Le pasteur
- The Horsemen (1971) as Zam Hajji
- Fiddler on the Roof (1971) as Russian Official
- Nicholas and Alexandra (1971) as Dr. Lazovert
- Mary, Queen of Scots (1971) as Duc François de Guise
- The Canterbury Tales (1972) as The Franklin
- Up the Front (1972) as Muller
- The Day of the Jackal (1973) as The Interrogator
- Story of a Love Story (1973)
- Revolt of the City (1973)
- Soft Beds, Hard Battles (1974) as Padre
- Fall of Eagles (1974) as Count Stookau
- The Marseille Contract (1974) as Lazar
- Murder on the Orient Express (1974) as Concierge
- Scent of a Woman (1974) as Don Carlo (uncredited)
- Galileo (1975) as First Secretary
- Playing with Fire (1975) as Un messager
- India Song (1975) as George Crown
- Le Chat et la souris (1975) as le complice de Germain
- The Secret Agent (1975) as Karl Yundt
- Il Messia (1975) as Samuele
- Operation Daybreak (1975) as Pyotr
- Le Sauvage (1975) as Coleman
- Michel Strogoff (1975) (TV miniseries) as Harry Blount
- Dickens of London (1976) as Legal gentleman
- Joseph Andrews (1977) as Fop Two
- The Spy Who Loved Me (1977) as Max Kalba
- March or Die (1977) as Mean corporal
- 1990 (1977) as Professor Cheever
- La petite fille en velours bleu (1978) as Lamberti
- CIA contro KGB (1978) as Le réceptionniste
- Ike (1979) as Gen. Charles de Gaulle
- Nijinsky (1980) as Sergei Grigoriev
- Sredni Vashtar (1981) as the Doctor
- Masada (1981) as Roman Chief Priest
- Condorman (1981) as Russian Agent
- La nuit de Varennes (1982) as Le juge saisie
- Enigma (1982)
- Nutcracker (1982) as Markovitch
- Marco Polo (1982) as Pietro D'Abano
- An Englishman Abroad (1983) as Guildenstern
- Wagner (1983) as Giacomo Meyerbeer
- Ronde de nuit (1984) as James – le majordome
- The Perils of Gwendoline in the Land of the Yik-Yak (1984)
- A.D. (1985) as Titus Flavius Sabinus
- Morenga (1985) as Lohmann
- Mata Hari (1985) as Prosecutor
- "The Six Napoleons" from The Return of Sherlock Holmes (1986) as Herr Mendelstam
- Caravaggio (1986) as Art Lover
- The Name of the Rose (1986) as Hugh of Newcastle
- Maschenka (1987) as Yasha
- Natalia (1988) as Alfred Grabner
- Catacombs (1988) as Brother Timothy
- Pascali's Island (1988) as Pariente
- Madame Sousatzka (1988) as Music Critic
- Testimony (1988) as Gargolovsky
- Splendor (1989) as Don Arno
- Indiana Jones and the Last Crusade (1989) as Butler
- The Hostage of Europe (1989) as Hudson Lowe
- The Plot to Kill Hitler (1990) as Erich Fellgiebel
- The Krays (1990) as Teacher
- The Garden (1990)
- A Season of Giants (1990) as Jacopo Galli
- Vincent and Me (1990) as Dr. Winkler
- Hamlet (1990) as Reynaldo
- Let Him Have It (1991) as Clerk of Court
- Prisoner of Honor (1991) as Rennes Prosecutor
- Les Enfants du naufrageur (1992)
- Toutes peines confondues (1992) as Thurston
- Venice/Venice (1992) as Alexander
- M. Butterfly (1993) as Agent Etancelin
- The Hour of the Pig (1993) as Apothecary
- Agatha Christie's Poirot ("Hercule Poirot's Christmas"; 1994) as Simeon Lee
- Jefferson in Paris (1995) as King's Translator
- England, My England (1995) as Spratt
- Surviving Picasso (1996) as Diaghilev
- Jude (1996) as Curator
- The Ogre (1996) as Lawyer
- Anna Karenina (1997) as Pestov
- The Odyssey (1997 miniseries) as Aegyptus
- As Time Goes By (1997) as Dr Stoker
- Déjà vu (1997) as Konstantine
- Father Ted ("Are You Right There Father Ted?"; 1998) as Old Nazi
- Merlin (1998) as 1st Physician
- Jinnah (1998) as Lord Willingdon
- Hilary and Jackie (1998) as Professor Bentley
- Spanish Fly (1998) as Carl's Friend
- St. Ives (1998) as Bonnefoy
- Dreaming of Joseph Lees (1999) as Italian Doctor
- The Body (2001) as Monsignor
- Revelation (2001) as Curé at Rennes-le-Chateau
- Festival in Cannes (2001) as Millie's Escort
- The Order (2001) as Oscar Cafmeyer, Rudy's father
- The Red Siren (2002) as Vitali
- Merci Docteur Rey (2002) as François
- White Teeth (2002) as 'The Devil of Dachau'
- The Falklands Play (2002) as Nicanor Costa Méndez
- Brocéliande (2003) as Professeur Brennos
- Before Sunset (2004) as Bookstore Manager
- Evilenko (2004) as Bagdasarov
- Iznogoud (2005) as Kitussé
- Empire of the Wolves (2005) as Kudseyi
- An American Haunting (2005) as Elder #1
- Priceless (2006) as Jacques
- Rome – season 2 (2007) as The Rabbi
- Asterix at the Olympic Games (2008) as Un druide (uncredited)
- Undisputed III: Redemption (2010) as Rezo
- Zarafa (2012) as Le vieux sage (voice)
- The Great Beauty (2013) as Arturo
- The Invisible Boy (2014) as Artiglio
- The Man with the Iron Heart (2017) as Emile Hacha
- The 15:17 to Paris (2018) as Older Man
- L'hypothèse de la reine rouge (2018) as Sherlock Holmes
- The Haunting of Margam Castle (2020) as Enos
- The Witcher (2021, 1 episode) - Older Elf
- The Gold (2023, 3 episodes) - Matteo Constantino
