= Chris Curran (actor) =

Irish actor

Chris Curran (died 19 August 1996) was an Irish actor, singer and musician.

Born in Cork, Curran was four when he made his stage debut at the Cork Opera House in Frank Benson's touring production of Shakespeare's A Midsummer Night's Dream. He went on to study acting under Father Seamus O'Flynn at the Cork Shakespearean Company, otherwise known as "The Loft". He continued to perform at the Cork Opera House while studying engineering at University College Cork. In 1953, Curran joined the Radio Éireann Players, a repertory company which performed in the station's weekly drama productions. A year later, and at short notice, he took the lead role in a broadcast of Henrik Ibsen's Peer Gynt which was produced by Tyrone Guthrie in his first collaboration with Ireland's national radio station.

For the next four decades, Curran enjoyed a varied career as a stage and screen actor, television narrator and pantomime performer. In the early 1960s, he provided voice-overs for all the characters in RTÉ Television's puppet series for children, Murphy agus a Cháirde ("Murphy and his friends"). His last television appearances came in 1995 and 1996 when he portrayed Father Jim Johnson in two episodes of Channel 4's sitcom Father Ted: "Competition Time" and "Cigarettes and Alcohol and Rollerblading".

Chris Curran was married to Josephine Scanlon, a Limerick-born soprano, with whom he had two daughters. He died in Leopardstown Park Hospital in Dublin ('in his early seventies') and is buried at Shanganagh Cemetery in Shankill.

== Filmography ==
Year	Title	Role	Notes
1965	Young Cassidy	Man in Phoenix Park	
1967	Ulysses	Myles Crawford	
1969	I Can't... I Can't		
1977	A Portrait of the Artist as a Young Man	Auctioneer	
1982	Cold River		
1996	Moll Flanders	Mazzawatti Butler	
