= A Christmassy Ted =

- Father Ted episode
- DVD release
- Episode no.: Episode Special
- Directed by: Andy DeEmmony, Declan Lowney
- Written by: Graham Linehan, Arthur Mathews
- Original air date: 24 December 1996

Guest appearances
- Gerard McSorley as "Father Todd Unctious"; Stephen Tompkinson as Father Peter Clifford; Dervla Kirwan as Assumpta Fitzgerald; Tony Guilfoyle as Father Larry Duff; Andrew McCulloch as Bishop Tom McCaskell; Kevin McKidd as Father Deegan; Seán Barrett as Father Fitzgerald

Episode chronology
← Previous "Flight Into Terror"	Next → "Are You Right There Father Ted?"

"A Christmassy Ted" is both the 17th episode and Christmas special of the Channel 4 sitcom Father Ted. This episode was broadcast on Christmas Eve 1996, between the second and third series, with a runtime of 55 minutes. Due to the popularity of this episode, it still gets repeated on Channel 4, RTÉ2 and More4 around Christmas every year. This was the last episode of Father Ted to be broadcast during the lifetime of Dermot Morgan, who played the series' titular priest, Father Ted Crilly. Morgan died suddenly of a heart attack in February 1998, the day after filming of the third series had been completed.

== Synopsis ==
The episode opens with Ted dreaming himself into the plot of Ballykissangel, telling Assumpta that he is going to leave the priesthood for her. Just as they start to kiss, Dougal wakes him just to offer him a peanut, much to his annoyance. Ted finds his dreams radically changed when he tries to sleep again: he is being chased by giant, snarling peanuts. Apparently, there is more to Ted's original dream than mere romantic fantasy, as he confesses the next day that he is dissatisfied with his current station in life, feeling that he does not receive enough recognition or excitement. Moving past this, Ted wishes for an uneventful, ordinary Christmas; seemingly on cue, the doorbell rings and Ted finds a baby on the doorstep. However, the mother, having mistaken Ted's house for someone else's, quickly removes the baby. Ted wonders if having a baby around the house could have led a number of humorous situations, but Dougal quickly convinces him that nothing interesting would have come of it.

While Christmas shopping in a department store, Ted and Dougal accidentally wander into what turns out to be the largest lingerie section in Ireland, instantly prompting Ted to worry that there will be a scandal if they are discovered. As they try to find the exit, they run into six other priests and Ted ultimately leads their escape in an unusually heroic fashion, parodying the style of troops in typical war movies. He uses the speaker system to tell shoppers that the store is about to close, forcing them out so that the eight priests cannot be spotted by women during their escape, which they successfully complete. Soon after, Ted learns he will receive a coveted Golden Cleric award as recognition for his actions; although disappointed that there is no cash prize, Ted is excited at the potential fame and prestige that comes with winning this award. However, when Mrs Doyle admits him to be only the second-best priest in the country and talks about a Protestant priest, he is thrown into a huff and goes off to muse on his future, inadvertently making an enemy of a fisherman on the way. He returns to find that, in his absence, Mrs Doyle has allowed Dougal to perform a funeral he was meant to do, with predictably disastrous consequences.

As Ted gets over the funeral performance issue, he gets a visit from an unknown priest who claims to be an old school friend of his. Mrs Doyle, after nearly an hour of random guessing, correctly identifies him as Father Todd Unctious, and he is invited to stay for Christmas. Meanwhile, Ted composes a vindictive acceptance speech for the award ceremony, pouncing on his chance to get back at everyone who has "fecked him over" in the past.

At the ceremony, Ted's vindictive speech goes on so long that all but a few attendees leave before he has finished. During Ted's party afterwards, the television is switched on and broadcasting an extended Latin mass so the priests who Ted helped rescue from the lingerie section find excuses to leave, including talking to someone on Death Row. Only Todd Unctious seems eager to stay. After Ted and Dougal go to bed, Unctious attempts to steal the award, only to be discovered by Ted after Dougal sneaks downstairs to watch a scary film on the television involving a burglar breaking into someone's house. After he is caught and arrested, Unctious explains that he had become overly obsessed with awards, which causes Ted to realise that he is suffering with the same problem. Ted resolves to become a better priest, but shows little sign of following through on his resolution. However, he agrees to share the award with Dougal, who briefly goes mad with power.

Also in this episode, while Ted and Dougal shop, Jack is left in the kiddie playland, where he teaches the children to say words such as "feck" and "arse", Mrs Doyle goes through a crisis when Ted gives her an automated teamaker (which she later stealthily sabotages in a way that cannot be detected), and she has several ungraceful landings from a ledge while putting up Christmas decorations.

== Analysis ==
Writer Graham Linehan states on the DVD commentary of this episode that he thinks it is "far too long" and at moments expresses his boredom towards the end of the commentary track.

Andy Riley, who previously collaborated with Linehan and Mathews, is one of the names mentioned, along with Neil Hannon, in Mrs Doyle's guessing game. In 2013, Riley noted the scene's similarity to a passage in Flann O'Brien's The Third Policeman, where the protagonist attempts to guess the name of the person who previously held his soul. Riley also suggests that this passage is inspired by the early Irish myth Togail Bruidne Dá Derga, where the hero Conair asks for a woman's name, only for her to list dozens. Noting that other O'Brien works contained elements of Irish mythology, Riley concluded, "I contend that Mrs Doyle's bit in "A Christmassy Ted" has a comic lineage stretching back more than 1,000 years into the misty beginnings of Irish history. If anyone knows a comic riff which has been around longer, I'd love to know." Father Luke Duke, one of the names Mrs Doyle mentions, was included as a character in Predating the Predators, a novella written by Philip Purser-Hallard for the 2008 Doctor Who spin-off collection The Vampire Curse.

Early on Ted says, "You slave away to the needs of your parishioners and what do you get? A one-way ticket to Palookaville." This is a reference to the famous taxicab scene from On The Waterfront.
