= Rynagh O'Grady =

Irish actress (1951–2021)

- Born: 18 April 1951; Dublin, Ireland
- Died: 7 February 2021 (aged 69); Dublin, Ireland
- Occupation: Actress

Rynagh O'Grady (18 April 1951 – 7 February 2021) was an Irish actress who was known for her roles of Mary O'Leary in the Channel 4 sitcom Father Ted and Minnie Kennedy in the 1999 film A Love Divided. She trained in the Abbey Theatre School and first appeared on their stage in 1969.

In Father Ted, she starred alongside Patrick Drury as a husband and wife couple, John and Mary, who constantly argue and fight, but act happily married when talking to the priests.

O'Grady died on 7 February 2021, at the age of 69.

== Partial filmography ==
- Play for Today (1973, TV Series) - Gráinne
- Within These Walls (1975, TV Series) - Cathy Rooney
- Let's Get Those English Girls (1976) - Doreen
- The Glittering Prizes (1976) - Christine
- Yanks Go Home (1977, TV Series) - Miss Franklin
- The Stud (1978) - Meter Maid (uncredited)
- S.O.S. Titanic (1979, TV Movie) - Mary Agatha Glynn
- Can We Get On Now, Please? (1980, TV Series)
- Number 10 (1983, TV Mini-Series) - Mary Coghlan
- Ascendancy (1983) - Rose
- The Lilac Bus (1990, TV Movie) - Nancy
- The Commitments (1991) - Bernie's Mother
- Far and Away (1992) - Olive
- The Bill (1993, TV Series) - Mrs. Connor
- The Snapper (1993, TV Movie) - Neighbour 1
- Don't Leave Me This Way (1993, TV Movie) - Viv Hicks
- The Bullion Boys (1993, TV Series) - Mrs. O'Brian
- The Rector's Wife (1994, TV Mini-Series) - Ella Pringle
- Widows' Peak (1994) - Maddie O'Hara, Broome's Maid
- Father Ted (1995-1998, TV Series) - Mary O'Leary
- Moll Flanders (1996) - Kindly Sister
- Night Train (1998) - Winnie
- A Love Divided (1999) - Minnie Kennedy
- When Brendan met Trudy (2000) - Lynn
- The Cassidys (2001, TV Series) - Jane Traynor
- Ultimate Force (2002, TV Series) - Mary
- Breakfast on Pluto (2005) - Mrs. Coyle
- Dorothy Mills (2008) - Mrs. Mc Cllellan
- Supervized (2019) - Dolores
