= Patrick Drury =

British actor

- Born: Patrick Drury; 19 August 1945 (age 80); London, England
- Occupation: Actor
- Years active: 1972–present
- Spouse: Caroline Langrishe (m. 1984; div. 1995)
- Children: 2

Patrick Drury (born 19 August 1945) is an English character actor best known for playing shopkeeper John O'Leary in the Channel 4 television comedy Father Ted and Ivan in The Beiderbecke Connection.

== Early life ==
Drury was educated at Cotton College, Staffordshire. He then read English at University College Dublin before going on to train at the Royal Academy of Dramatic Art in London.

== Career ==
He played the bartender/Lawrence of Arabia in the classic Harp lager advert from 1992 which featured the camel who exclaimed 'hey Lawrence, give us a pint of Harp and a packet of dates please.'

His film credits include the horror movie The Awakening (1980) starring Charlton Heston, and the 1984 comedy Laughterhouse (also known as Singleton's Pluck) with Ian Holm.

In the 2010 production of The Woman in Black at London's Fortune Theatre Drury played the part of Arthur Kipps.

Drury voiced Ermion in the 2015 video game The Witcher 3: Wild Hunt.

In 2016 he played the role of the Lord Chamberlain in the Netflix series The Crown.

== Film and television roles ==
- I, Claudius (1976) - Courier - "A Touch of Murder", "Family Affairs"
- Disraeli (1978) - Montagu Corry - 2 episodes
- Shelley (1980) - Ken - "Expletive Deleted"
- The Awakening (1980) - Paul Whittier - TV film
- Escape (1980) - Det. Sgt. Forsyth - "Lord Lucan"
- Diamonds (1981) - Policeman - "Homecoming"
- By the Sword Divided (1983) - Capt. Bracewell - "A Silver Moon"
- Crown Court (1984) - John Laing - "Dirty Washing: Part 1"
- Florence Nightingale (1984) - Henry Nicholson - TV Movie
- Shine on Harvey Moon (1984, 1985) - Adrian Horowitz - 2 episodes
- Brat Farrar (1986) - Kevin McDermott, Q.C. - Episode #1.2
- The Beiderbecke Connection (1988) - Ivan - 4 episodes
- Mike & Angelo (1989) - Dr. Waterstone - "Mother and the Doctor"
- Saracen (1989) - Bernard McGrath - "Starcross"
- Casualty (1990) - Gordon Robinson - "Love’s a Pain"
- The Manageress (1990) - Mark Sadler - 6 episodes
- Shoot to Kill (1990) - Detective Inspector - TV Movie
- TECX (1990) - Paul Forbes - "A Soldier's Death"
- The Men's Room (1991) - James Walton - 3 episodes
- The Ruth Rendell Mysteries (1988-1992) - Chief Supt. Howard Fortune - 6 episodes
- Rumpole of the Bailey (1992) - Desmond Casterini - "Rumpole and the Eternal Triangle"
- Moon and Son (1992) - Inspector Sardou - 5 episodes
- Inspector Morse (1993) - Frank McTeer - "The Day of the Devil"
- Soldier Soldier (1993) - Lt. Col Mark Osbourne - 3 episodes
- Harry (1993) - Monaghan - episode #1.11
- Screen One (1994) - Maj. Anthony Hamilton-Smith - "A Breed of Heroes"
- The Bill (1995) - Michael Jackson - "In On The Game"
- The Politician's Wife (1995) - Ian Ruby Smith - 3 episodes
- In Suspicious Circumstances (1996) - Jack Durham - "The Silent Witness"
- Casualty (1996) - George Wilson - "Do You Believe in Fairies?"
- The Bill (1998) - Mr. Green - "The Stork"
- Heat of the Sun (1998) - Foreign Office Gent - "Private Lives"
- Father Ted (1995-1998) - John O’Leary - 6 episodes
- Midsomer Murders (2001) - Robin Wooliscroft - Episode: "Who Killed Cock Robin?"
- Silent Witness (2004) - Bob Gaghan - "A Time To Heal: Part 1"
- The Bill (2004) - DS Patrick McCourt - "Going Native"
- Judge John Deed (2005) - Sam Hill - "Lost and Found"
- Murder in Suburbia (2005) - Peter Allen - "For Better, for Worse"
- Cold Blood (2005) - Tom Wilburn - Episode: "Cold Blood"
- Midsomer Murders (2006) - Connor Simpson - "Death in Chorus"
- Lennon Naked (2010) - Apple Accountant - TV Movie
- The Crown (2016) - Lord Chamberlain - 5 episodes
- Ripper Street (2016) - Col. Sir Edward Bradford - Episodes: "A Last Good Act", "Occurrence Reports"
- Doctors (2022) - Ted Fletcher - Episode: "Taking Stock"

== Personal life ==
Drury was married to actress Caroline Langrishe before divorcing in 1995. They have two daughters: Rosalind and Leonie.
