= Maurice O'Donoghue =

Irish actor

- Born: Maurice Cornelius O'Donoghue; Ireland
- Known for: Father Ted

Maurice Cornelius O'Donoghue is an Irish actor best known for his role as Father Dick Byrne on Father Ted.

He was an English teacher in Mayfield Community School, Cork, Ireland and was known to be one of the best English teachers of his time in 1970's Ireland. He would often act out Shakespeare plays.

His character in Father Ted is well known for his long running feud with Ted, mainly in competitions and the over 75s football tournament. In 1997 he appeared as Eamonn in three episodes of EastEnders.

O'Donoghue is a member of the Theatrical Cavaliers Cricket club, and has captained the team on many occasions.

== Filmography ==
=== Film ===
Year	Title	Role	Notes
1984	Pigs		
1988	The Courier		
1988	Da		
1989	Big Swinger		Short
1990	After Midnight		
1990	Connemara		
1993	Faith		Short
1994	War of the Buttons		
2014	Song of the Sea	The Great Seanchaí	Voice; Irish-language version

=== Television ===
Year	Title	Role	Notes
1995–1998	Father Ted	Father Dick Byrne	
1996–1997	Ros na Rún	Chris Barrett	Credited as "Muiris Ó Donnchú"
1997	EastEnders	Eamonn Flaherty	
2004	Buried Alive		
2004	The Fairytaler		
