= Mykola Pawluk =

British television video editor

Mykola Andrej Pawluk (born 23 June 1956) is an English television video editor whose career has spanned four decades mostly in the media of comedy. He has twice been nominated for a BAFTA.

Born in Windsor in Berkshire, the son of Wasyl Pawluk and Gerta L Giesen, he was raised in Egham in Surrey by his German mother and Ukrainian father. He attended Egham Hythe Secondary Modern School in Egham during the 1960s. He married Julia Ince in 1981.

Pawluk's editing credits include Terry and June (1979), The Black Adder (1983), The Kenny Everett Television Show (1983–1988), French and Saunders (for which he received his first BAFTA nomination in 1989), Chelmsford 123 (1990), Harry Enfield's Television Programme (1990–1992), Drop the Dead Donkey (for which he received his second BAFTA nomination in 1991), Harry Enfield and Chums (1994–1998), Men Behaving Badly (1994–1998), Is It Legal? (1995–1998), Father Ted (1996–1998), The Vicar of Dibley (1996–2007), Dinnerladies, Whose Line Is It Anyway? (1998–1999, 2013–2015), Gimme Gimme Gimme (1999–2001), Perfect World (2000–2001), Coupling (2000–2004), My Hero (2002–2006), Little Britain (2003–2006), The Catherine Tate Show (2004–2007), Mock the Week (2005–2017, 2026), Ask Rhod Gilbert (2010) and A League of Their Own (2012).

Since 1992, he has been the Director of Editing at The Independent Post Company (IPC), the largest editing agency in the UK.
