= Declan Lowney =

Irish film and television director

- Born: 23 April 1960 (age 66); Wexford, County Wexford, Ireland
- Occupations: Film director; television director
- Years active: 1980–present

Declan Lowney (born 23 April 1960) is an Irish television and film director. Known initially for directing musical events such as the 1988 Eurovision Song Contest, Lowney has also directed Irish and British television comedies, including Cold Feet and Little Britain. He won a BAFTA Award in 1995 for directing Father Ted. He was awarded a second BAFTA Award in 2006 for his work on BBC comedy Help.

He has directed two feature films, Wild About Harry in 2000, and Alan Partridge: Alpha Papa in 2013.

== Background ==
Lowney was born in Wexford in County Wexford, Ireland on 23 April 1960. At the age of 12, he began using his uncle's Super 8 camera to make short films, and became the winner of local amateur film competitions. His parents wanted him to go into a career in law, but he decided to continue making films instead. In 1977, he directed The Rose that Bloomed, a documentary film about the 25th Wexford Film Festival.

== Career ==
In 1980, Lowney released Wavelength, a 17-minute short subject about pirate radio in Dublin that he directed and produced. It won the Critics Choice for Outstanding Irish Film at the 1980 Cork Film Festival. Throughout the 1980s, he worked for Irish national broadcaster RTÉ including as a producer on the show TV Ga Ga (1985). He became known for directing musical events, including the 1988 Eurovision Song Contest, for which he won a Jacob's Award. Lowney courted controversy shortly before the contest, when he stated in an interview that Eurovision was "just an excuse for a load of TV executives to go on the piss on expenses". Into the 1990s, he directed the Bob Marley biopic Time Will Tell (1991) and The Velvet Underground's 1993 tour Live MCMXCIII.

After directing some Penn and Teller shows and the Jo Brand series Through the Cake Hole, Lowney met with writers Arthur Mathews and Graham Linehan about directing a new sitcom they had written called Paris. He did not get the job, but Matthews and Linehan remembered him when they were putting together a production team for their next sitcom, Father Ted. Lowney took input from Linehan and Matthews on set, and the three often refined the scripts during filming. One of Lowney's favourite episodes is "Song for Europe", which mocks the frequency Ireland wins the Eurovision Song Contest, and features a music video scene. For his work on two series and the Christmas special, Lowney was the co-recipient of the 1995 BAFTA Television Award for Best Comedy (Programme or Series). Lowney was met by Christine Langan, a Granada Television producer who wanted him to direct Cold Feet, an ITV Comedy Premiere. Lowney agreed and Cold Feet was filmed in 1996, though not broadcast until 1997. It was a success, winning the Golden Rose of Montreux and a British Comedy Award. Langan asked Lowney if he would like to return to direct the first two episodes of the recently commissioned series of Cold Feet. He declined the invitation because the production schedules clashed with his first feature film, Mattie. Written by Hugh Leonard, Mattie was to star Terence Stamp and Mia Farrow. Funding for the film fell through the week before principal photography was due to begin. Lowney was offered the first episodes of Cold Feet again and this time accepted. The episodes were broadcast in 1998.

After the failure of Mattie, Lowney finally got the chance to direct a debut feature with Wild About Harry (2000). The following year, he directed the first series of Paul Whitehouse's Happiness, which was nominated for a BAFTA. He returned for the second series in 2003. In 2005, he directed Whitehouse's Help, and the third series of Little Britain. Help won Lowney his second BAFTA and Little Britain secured him another nomination. In 2008, he directed a major television advertising campaign for Reveal magazine. In 2009, he directed the RTÉ sitcom Never Mind the Nursing Home and three episodes of the ITV romantic comedy Married Single Other, which were broadcast in early 2010. In 2010, Lowney directed a performance of Riverdance in Beijing in high-definition. The performance was scheduled for release on Blu-ray to mark 15 years of the troupe.

Lowney played a role developing Eddie the Eagle, a biographical film about Eddie 'the Eagle' Edwards, and was reportedly set to direct. However the film was eventually directed by Dexter Fletcher.

In 2013 Lowney directed Steve Coogan in the Alan Partridge feature film, Alan Partridge: Alpha Papa.

== Personal life ==
Lowney is married to Jenny, and they have two sons, Danny and Ted, and a daughter, Joya. Ted was named after the title character of Father Ted as a tribute to actor Dermot Morgan, who died the day after Lowney and Jenny learned she was pregnant. Danny made an appearance in the first episode of Happiness, playing Josh.
