= Tony Guilfoyle =

Irish actor

- Born: 30 March 1960 (age 66); County Wicklow, Ireland
- Occupation: Actor
- Years active: 1981–present

Tony Guilfoyle (born 30 March 1960) is an Irish actor. He was born in County Wicklow, Ireland, and was educated at the Drama Centre from 1970 to 1973. He is best known for his recurring role as the accident-prone Father Larry Duff, in the TV comedy series Father Ted.

In theatre, he is best known for his long collaboration with Quebecois theatre director Robert Lepage and the latter's production company Ex Machina. Included in that association are a staging of Mahler's Kindertotenlieder at the Lincoln Center and world tour, The Geometry Of Miracles performed at the Royal National Theatre and worldwide, The Dragons' Trilogy performed at the Barbican Theatre in London and internationally, and their latest collaboration, Playing Cards: SPADES, the first in a planned tetralogy covering the four suits of deck of playing cards, which played at the Roundhouse in London and internationally. He has other numerous and varied theatre credits, from Shopping and F**king at the Royal Court Theatre in the West End, to The Iceman Cometh at the Almeida Theatre in London, with Kevin Spacey, and Hanif Kureshi's play Outskirts with the Royal Shakespeare Company at the Donmar Warehouse in London.

In cinema, Guilfoyle played the lead, Rory, in The Return (1986), for Film Four, and the Magistrate in The Murder of Stephen Lawrence, written and directed by Paul Greengrass. On TV, in addition to playing Father Larry Duff on Father Ted, he starred in the HBO/BBC historical drama Rome, playing Pothinus, an Egyptian eunuch and pharaoh's aide. Other TV credits include a role in a 1985 episode of Juliet Bravo, as unhinged hostage taker Moll Kelly, and brief roles in The Musketeers, Merlin, The Virgin Queen, Fanny Hill, and Bleak House. In 2016, he appeared as the Bishop of Durham, in the Netflix series The Crown. In October 2019, he appeared as Jack Dacre in an episode of the BBC soap opera Doctors.

== Filmography ==
Year	Title	Role	Notes
1981	Spearhead	Sergeant Brawne	TV series, episode "Loyalties"
1982	Squadron	Flt. Lt. Tony Jackson	TV series, episode "The Veteran"
1984	Tucker's Luck	Frank	TV series, 2 episodes
1985	Juliet Bravo	Moll Kelly	TV series, episode "Hostage to Fortune"
1985	Black Silk	Terry Reed	TV series, episode "Winner Stays On"
1986	First Among Equals	Shadow Irish Minister	TV miniseries, episode "#1.8"
1986	The Return	Rory	TV movie
1986–2002	Casualty	Lyndsey, Watch Commander	TV series, 6 episodes
1987	Knights of God	Sergeant	TV series, 2 episodes
1991–2002	The Bill	Reporter, Terry Downey, Security Manager, John Goulding, Mr. Bailey	TV series, 5 episodes
1992	Inspector Morse	Journalist One	TV series, episode "Happy Families"
1992	Between the Lines	Dr. Owen-Smith	TV series, episode "Nothing Personal"
1994	Wycliffe	Bill Clark	TV series, episode "The Pea Green Boat"
1995	99-1	Smith	TV series, episode "A Game of Two Halves"
1995	Boon	Clerk, receptionist	TV series, episode "Thieves Like Us"
1995	Shine on Harvey Moon	RAF Sergeant	TV series, episode "#5.6"
1996	Father Ted	Father Larry Duff	TV series, 8 episodes
1997	Gobble	Mr. George Henderson, Colin's boss	TV movie
1997	Birds of a Feather	Prison Officer	TV series, 2 episodes
1999	The Murder of Stephen Lawrence	Magistrate	TV movie
2001	Todesstrafe – Ein Deutscher hinter Gittern	Officer Henderson	TV movie
2002	NCS: Manhunt	Patsy O'Brien	TV series, episode "Collision Course: Part 1"
2005	The Golden Hour	Deacon	TV miniseries, episode "#1.2"
2005	Rome	Pothinus	TV series, episode "Caesarion"
2005	Bleak House	Lawyer	TV miniseries, episode "#1.15"
2006	The Virgin Queen	Sir John Brydges	TV miniseries, episode "#1.1"
2006	The Best Man	Baxter	TV movie
2006	Murder City	Dr. Simon Kramer	TV series, episode "Death of a Ladies' Man"
2007	Fanny Hill	Old Clergyman	TV miniseries, episode "#1.1"
2009	The Conservatory	(voice)	TV short
2009	Wolves	The Man	TV short
2010	The Eagleman Stag	Philip	TV short
2010	Traumdeutung	(voice)	TV short
2012	Merlin	Sindri	TV series, episode "A Lesson in Vengeance"
2015	The Musketeers	Chancellor Dupre	TV series, episode "A Marriage of Inconvenience"
2016	The Crown	Michael Ramsey, Bishop of Durham	TV series, 2 episodes
2017	Decline and Fall	Vicar	TV miniseries, 2 episodes
2017	Broken	Father Patrick	TV series, episode "Christina"
2019	Doctors	Jack Dacre	TV series, episode "Heart to Heart"
