= Father Ted Crilly =

Television situation comedy character

- Father Ted character
- Dermot Morgan as Father Ted
- First appearance: Stage: "The Fun Bunch" (1987); Television: "Good Luck, Father Ted" (1995)
- Last appearance: "Going to America" (1998)
- Created by: Arthur Mathews; Graham Linehan
- Portrayed by: Arthur Mathews (stage); Dermot Morgan (TV series)

In-universe information
- Occupation: Priest
- Religion: Roman Catholic
- Home: Craggy Island Parochial House, Craggy Island, County Clare, Ireland
- Nationality: Irish

Father Ted Crilly is the eponymous main character of the British Channel 4 situation comedy Father Ted. Created by Graham Linehan and Arthur Mathews, Ted was portrayed by comedian Dermot Morgan for the programme's three series. The character is a morally dubious Roman Catholic priest exiled to Craggy Island, a small island off the coast of Galway in Ireland.

The character was originally created by Mathews for a short-lived stand-up routine in the late 1980s. In 1994, Linehan and Mathews cast Morgan in the role for the television series, developing the character to match his abilities. Morgan's performance was acclaimed; after his untimely death on 28 February 1998 from a heart attack, he was awarded a posthumous BAFTA for his work in the third series.

== Concept and creation ==
The Joshua Trio on Nighthawks, 1989. Arthur Mathews (centre) portrays an early version of Father Ted Crilly.

Arthur Mathews had a lifelong fascination with priests, and developed the character of Father Ted while working at Hot Press with Graham Linehan and Paul Woodfull in 1987–89. After considering several surnames, Linehan suggested Crilly, which stuck. Mathews has described his version of Ted as a generic priest, but Woodfull saw the character as more camp, and later said that he felt Mathews had preempted the camp/gay priest stereotype in Irish comedy.

During production weekends, Mathews and Woodfull had the idea for The Joshua Trio, a comedic U2 tribute band. The band performed various warm-up sketches written by Mathews, Woodfull and Linehan, who joined in a non-musical capacity. This led to a side-project, a short-lived sketch troupe called The Fun Bunch. Deciding to base a sketch around Mathews's Father Ted character, the group brainstormed for a surname in Linehan's Castleknock kitchen; Linehan suggested Crilly, which stuck immediately. Mathews debuted his character on-stage at a comedy night in the Project Arts Centre. The character was received better than Woodfull's own working-class Dublin priest, and Mathews later appeared as Father Ted in warm-up sketches for The Joshua Trio and Woodfull's other musical act, Tony St James and The Las Vegas Sound. As Ted, Mathews sometimes read from a book, Notes from Africa, purportedly written by Father Dougal McGuire, a missionary friend who described his experiences of being attacked and chased by natives. In one sketch, Ted discussed his concern for Dougal, who had been voted Most Unpopular Priest in Africa for two years running and was spending Christmas up a tree in the grounds of The Bob Geldof Centre. During one Tony St James Olympia gig, audience members shouted "Not a fucking priest!", but were pleased when Ted produced a portable confessional and proceeded to talk about it. On one occasion at The Purty Loft in Dún Laoghaire, he sang "We Don't Have to Take Our Clothes Off".

Later, Mathews and Woodfull included the character in The Starship Róisín, a short-lived science fiction comedy radio series they wrote for The Ian Dempsey Show on RTÉ Radio. An Irish parody of Star Trek, it followed the adventures of Captain Bono (played by Woodfull, based on the singer Bono) and his Vulcan sidekick Stephen "Spock" Roche (played by Mathews, based on cyclist Stephen Roche, with a "cold, cycling brain". Storylines involved "space bicycles", the ship chef Darina Alien (based on Darina Allen), emcee Tony St James (Woodfull), Johnny Guitar (a "little fella" who made guitar sounds), and ship chaplain Father Ted (Mathews). Woodfull later said that the show was "probably a bit too weird for [its] slot", and that, when the station suggested they take two of the characters and launch a spin-off called Tea and Toast with Tony and Ted, Mathews opted out.

In 1989, Ted (played by Mathews) performed with The Joshua Trio in an episode of the Irish music anthology series Nighthawks, marking the character's first televised appearance.

"He's a perpetually jolly and rather sad man who, through some terrible accident of faith, has found himself in the priesthood."

— Irish Lives, 1990 (unproduced script)

In 1990, Linehan and Mathews began writing Irish Lives, a six-part comedy television series. The show would have taken the form of a mockumentary, with each episode focusing on interviewing a different character; one of the six characters was Father Ted Crilly. The script, delivered in 1990, described Ted as "a perpetually jolly and rather sad man who, through some terrible accident of faith, has found himself in the priesthood." The story involved Ted returning to his seminary to catch up with his old friends, including Father Jack, whom he fails to realise has recently died. Producer Geoffrey Perkins asked Linehan and Mathews to discard the mockumentary format and expand the Father Ted episode to a traditional sitcom.

Linehan found the character of Ted easier to write if he imagined Mathews's version delivering the lines. "Every time I wrote Ted in the early days, I'd hear Arthur's voice... Ted was this very bland character who'd never curse except for saying a very quiet 'feck' to himself. That panic and turmoil under the surface defined Ted before we even started writing him. Years later, when we did, it was just like pressing 'play' on a tape recorder."

One of the writers' key influences was Charles Grodin's character in the 1972 film The Heartbreak Kid.

== Casting ==
Actor Maurice O'Donoghue auditioned for the role, and Linehan felt that he was the right appearance, age and "lightness" for the character. Mathews wanted to cast comedian Dermot Morgan from an early stage, but Linehan was reluctant; he worried that audiences would confuse Ted with Father Trendy, a character Morgan had previously created for The Live Mike. Trendy parodied a class of priests including Brian D'Arcy, perceived in the 1970s as wanting to be considered liberal and "cool", whereas Ted was written as a more conservative, traditional priest. Morgan lobbied hard for the role, eventually persuading Linehan. The writers considered O'Donoghue a back-up to use should Morgan become unavailable, and later created Father Dick Byrne, Ted's recurring rival, specifically for O'Donoghue to play.

Aspects such as Ted's obsession with money and fantasy of going to Las Vegas emerged while writing for Morgan, and the writers began to feel for Ted in a way they did not for the other characters.

After the second series aired, Linehan said he still believed that Mathews could easily have played Ted in the show.

There have been several attempts to remake the show for American audiences. In 2004, Steve Martin was reported to have signed on to play Ted in a new version. In 2007, John Michael Higgins was cast in the part.

== Fictional character biography ==
Considered his family's "idiot brother", Ted was sent off to the priesthood while his brother, the favourite son, became a doctor, as was the custom at the time. Ted attended Saint Colm's seminary, and was bullied by the other novices, who nicknamed him Father Fluffybottom after seeing his backside in the showers. Some time after being ordained, he was stationed in a Wexford parish, where he was investigated under suspicion of stealing the money for a child's pilgrimage to Lourdes to fund his own trip to Las Vegas. Despite escaping formal charges and his insistence the money was "just resting in his account", Bishop Brennan still banished Ted to the remote, cold, rainy Craggy Island, telling him that he would stay there until all of the money was accounted for. Ted was unsuccessful in this regard, as in the first series he mentions having lived on the island for over six years. He was eventually promoted and managed to move to a comfortable parish in Dublin, though his stay there was abruptly ended after irregularities in his expenses claims were discovered, and he was promptly sent straight back to Craggy Island.

For the duration of the show, Ted lives in the Craggy Island Parochial House with the childlike and dimwitted Father Dougal McGuire, the senile, aggressive and alcoholic Father Jack Hackett, and their neurotic housekeeper, Mrs Doyle (whom Linehan states Ted first met when she won the local Lovely Girls competition). He has a bitter rivalry with Father Dick Byrne, a priest living on the nearby Rugged Island. Ted's experiences throughout the show range from the mundane (having to protest against a blasphemous film in "The Passion of Saint Tibulus" and rigging a raffle to repair the roof in "Think Fast, Father Ted"), to the surreal (becoming Ireland's entry for Eurosong 1996 in "A Song for Europe", and climbing out of a flying plane to fix the fuel line in "Flight Into Terror"). In "A Christmassy Ted", Ted prevents a national scandal by helping seven other priests find their way out of Ireland's largest department store lingerie section. The Church honours him with the Golden Cleric award.

Fathers Ted and Dougal then host the 1997 Comic Relief telethon (with Morgan and O'Hanlon in character for the duration of the event); when Ted wonders why he has been selected, Dougal suggests that God has planned it to allow Ted a chance to earn forgiveness for his sins by raising money for the charity.

In the next episode, the first of series three, "Are You Right There Father Ted?", Ted has been transferred to an idyllic parish in Castlelawn, Dublin, but is soon sent back to Craggy Island when irregularities are discovered in his expenses. He later discovers the hard way that there is a Chinatown on Craggy Island and then has to go to great lengths to disprove rumours that he is a racist.

In the final episode, "Going to America", Ted persuades the suicidal Father Kevin not to jump off a ledge at the "It's Great Being a Priest! '98" conference. Impressed, an American priest offers Ted a place at his Los Angeles parish. Ted, unable to tell the others that they cannot come with him, is wracked with guilt; he cancels the move at the last minute after discovering Los Angeles' gang problem, then tells them that he has realised he belongs on Craggy Island. Dougal says that they will live together on the island forever, and a montage of clips from all previous episodes is shown before the episode ends.

The episode originally ended by flashing forward a year to the next conference. Ted sees Father Kevin standing on the ledge again; instead of helping, he joins him on the ledge, preparing to jump himself. The scene was cut and replaced with the montage following Morgan's death and poor reaction from audiences. Mathews later noted that the original ending still left Ted's fate ambiguous, and would have suggested the possibility of future episodes. Linehan stated: "It's nice to think of them all in the house having adventures, but when you think about it, it's really cruel to Ted. It's just an awful future for him... he's not watching a sitcom, he's living this awful life."

== Personality ==
The Independent characterised Ted as "by turns devious, cunning and disingenuous", noting a running joke about parish funds being traced to Ted's personal account. Ardal O'Hanlon, who played Father Dougal, said that Ted was the show's only rounded, fully formed character, and that the rest of the cast were essentially playing caricatures. Ted is frequently portrayed as a natural leader, albeit within the context of the priesthood.

In a 1997 interview, Morgan attributed the show's success to the appealing double-act formed by Dougal, "an idiot who knows nothing", and Ted, "an idiot who thinks he knows something but actually knows nothing." The actor identified Ted as "an Everyman guy, bumbling through life with a half-wit".

Linehan and Mathews have described Ted as a decent man, albeit one with "cheap" and "earthly" ambitions; they note that he would hate to become a bishop or cardinal. Ted does not want to be seen as a priest, but is still willing to flash his collar and ask for free entry at the cinema. The writers also agree that Ted is the character most like them. Mathews grew up surrounded by priests (including his own uncle), and it was from these priests that Mathews drew Ted's "voice". Linehan is often asked about potential Father Ted spin-offs, but believes that Ted himself is the only character complex enough to survive outside the Father Ted environment. Mathews has suggested that Ted could even have worked well in a spin-off drama series.

The writers agree that Ted should be married to Polly Clarke (played by Gemma Craven), the novelist he becomes infatuated with in "And God Created Woman", and consider the impossibility of their relationship "terribly sad".

== Appearance ==
Ted is a middle-aged man with a distinctive head of silver-grey hair (often imitated through wigs by cosplaying fans). He wears two badges: one is a pin signifying membership of the Pioneers, an Irish Catholic teetotalers organisation, and the other is a Fáinne, which indicates the wearer's fluency in the Irish language.

== Reception and legacy ==
In 1996, Morgan was named the Best TV Comedy Actor at the British Comedy Awards for his performance in the second series. He died in February 1998, one day after the third series of Father Ted completed recording, and was posthumously given the Award for Best Comedy Performance at the British Academy Television Awards 1999.

In November 2014, the Irish Examiner named Ted the greatest Irish TV character, calling him "a rare example of a straight man providing almost as many chuckles as his compatriots" and praising his characterisation as an "upstanding-yet-oh-so-faintly-slippery man of the cloth" as true to life for many rural Irish viewers.
