= Father Ted =

British-produced sitcom set in Ireland (1995–1998)

- Screenshot from opening credits
- Genre: Sitcom
- Created by: Graham Linehan; Arthur Mathews
- Written by: Graham Linehan; Arthur Mathews
- Directed by: Declan Lowney; Andy De Emmony
- Starring: Dermot Morgan; Ardal O'Hanlon; Frank Kelly; Pauline McLynn
- Opening theme: "Songs of Love" (instrumental)
- Composer: The Divine Comedy
- Country of origin: United Kingdom
- Original language: English
- No. of series: 3
- No. of episodes: 25 (list of episodes)

Production
- Executive producer: Mary Bell
- Producers: Geoffrey Perkins; Lissa Evans
- Production locations: The London Studios; County Clare
- Cinematography: Eugene O'Connor
- Camera setup: Multi-camera
- Running time: 23–25 minutes 55 minutes (Christmas Special)
- Production company: Hat Trick Productions

Original release
- Network: Channel 4
- Release: 21 April 1995 – 1 May 1998

Father Ted is a sitcom created by Irish writers Graham Linehan and Arthur Mathews and produced by British production company Hat Trick Productions for British television channel Channel 4. It aired over three series from 21 April 1995 until 1 May 1998, including a Christmas special, for a total of 25 episodes. It aired on Nine Network (series 1) and ABC Television (series 2 and 3) in Australia, and on TV2 in New Zealand. It is regarded as one of the greatest sitcoms of all time.

Set on the fictional Craggy Island, a remote location off Ireland's west coast, Father Ted stars Dermot Morgan as Father Ted Crilly, alongside fellow priests Father Dougal McGuire (Ardal O'Hanlon) and Father Jack Hackett (Frank Kelly). Dishonourably exiled on the island by Bishop Leonard Brennan (Jim Norton) for various reasons, the priests live together in the parochial house with their housekeeper Mrs Doyle (Pauline McLynn). The show's combination of low-brow humour with portrayals of loneliness and existentialism experienced by its title character has been much acclaimed.

Father Ted won several British Academy Television Awards—including twice for Best Comedy Series, and remains a popular sitcom in Ireland and the UK. In a 2001 Channel 4 poll, Dougal was ranked fifth on their list of the 100 Greatest TV Characters. In 2019, Father Ted was named the second-greatest British sitcom (after Fawlty Towers) by a panel of comedy experts for Radio Times.

== Concept and creation ==
Arthur Mathews created the character of Father Ted while working at Hot Press in 1987–89. During production weekends, he and Paul Woodfull had the idea for The Joshua Trio, a comedic U2 tribute band. The band performed various warm-up sketches written by Mathews, Woodfull, and Graham Linehan, who joined in a non-musical capacity. These sketches included stand-up performed by Mathews in-character as Father Ted Crilly. As Ted, Mathews sometimes read from a book, Notes from Africa, purportedly written by Father Dougal McGuire, a missionary friend who described his experiences of being attacked and chased by natives. In one sketch, Ted discussed his concern for Dougal, who had been voted Most Unpopular Priest in Africa for two years running and was spending Christmas up a tree in the grounds of The Bob Geldof Centre.

In 1990, Linehan and Mathews began writing Irish Lives, a six-part comedy television series. The show would have taken the form of a mockumentary, with each episode focusing on interviewing a different character, one of whom was Father Ted Crilly. The story involved Ted returning to his seminary to catch up with old friends. When producer Geoffrey Perkins asked Linehan and Mathews to discard the mockumentary format and expand the Father Ted episode to a traditional sitcom, Father Dougal became one of the main characters. When writing Dougal, Linehan and Mathews drew on Stan Laurel, incorporating some of Linehan's own behaviour during moments of confusion.

== Synopsis ==
The show follows the misadventures of three Irish Roman Catholic priests who live in a parish on the fictional Craggy Island, located off the west coast of Ireland. Father Ted Crilly, Father Dougal McGuire and Father Jack Hackett live chaotically together in Craggy Island's parochial house, along with their housekeeper Mrs Doyle, who always wants to serve them tea.

The three priests answer to Bishop Len Brennan, who has banished them to Craggy Island as punishment for different incidents in their past: Ted for alleged financial impropriety (apparently involving some money "resting" in his account and a child being deprived of a visit to Lourdes so that Ted could go to Las Vegas), Dougal for an event only referred to as the "Blackrock Incident" (resulting in "many nuns' lives [being] irreparably damaged"), and Jack for his alcoholism and womanising, particularly for an unspecified incident at a wedding in Athlone.

The show revolves around the priests' lives on Craggy Island, sometimes dealing with matters of the church but more often dealing with Father Ted's schemes to either resolve a situation with the parish or other Craggy Island residents, or to win games of one-upmanship against his enemy, Father Dick Byrne of the nearby Rugged Island parish.

== Casting ==
Actor Maurice O'Donoghue auditioned for the role of Ted, and Linehan felt that he was the right appearance, age and "lightness" for the character. Mathews wanted to cast comedian Dermot Morgan from an early stage, but Linehan was reluctant; he worried that audiences would confuse Ted with Father Trendy, a character Morgan had previously created for The Live Mike. Trendy parodied a class of priests including Brian D'Arcy, perceived in the 1970s as wanting to be considered liberal and "cool", whereas Ted was written as a more conservative, traditional priest. Morgan lobbied hard for the role, eventually persuading Linehan. The writers considered O'Donoghue a back-up to use should Morgan become unavailable, and later created Father Dick Byrne, Ted's recurring rival, specifically for O'Donoghue to play.

Aspects such as Ted's obsession with money and fantasy of going to Las Vegas emerged while writing for Morgan, and the writers began to feel for Ted in a way they did not for the other characters.

== Cast and characters ==
=== Main ===
- Dermot Morgan as Father Ted Crilly
- Ardal O'Hanlon as Father Dougal McGuire
- Frank Kelly as Father Jack Hackett
- Pauline McLynn as Mrs. Doyle

=== Recurring ===
- Patrick Drury as John O'Leary
- Rynagh O'Grady as Mary O'Leary
- Pat Shortt as Tom
- Jim Norton as Bishop Leonard Brennan
- Maurice O'Donoghue as Father Dick Byrne
- Don Wycherley as Father Cyril McDuff
- Graham Norton as Father Noel Furlong
- Tony Guilfoyle as Father Larry Duff
- Rosemary Henderson as Sister Assumpta

== Episodes ==
Series
Series	Episodes	Originally released	
Series	Episodes	First released	Last released
1	6	21 April 1995	26 May 1995
2	10	8 March 1996	10 May 1996
Special		24 December 1996	
3	8	13 March 1998	1 May 1998

== Production ==
=== Writing ===
Graham spent a lot of time listening to the Pixies and watching Taxi Driver. When I knew him first, it was like he'd never been outside the house, except to go to see Star Wars films, so his influences were never that Irish, whereas I grew up in the country... I remember Frank Kelly and Hall's Pictorial Weekly. He did a show called The Glen Abbey Show, which was very funny. So I was always aware of the strangeness and madness of Irish things.

— Arthur Mathews, The Tom Dunne Show, 12 October 2012

Linehan and Mathews first met while working at Hot Press. In the late 1980s, Mathews, Paul Woodfull and Kieran Woodfull formed The Joshua Trio, a U2 tribute band. The trio began writing comedy sketches to accompany their act. Mathews created the Father Ted character for his short-lived stand-up routine. Before The Joshua Trio played at gigs, Mathews would occasionally come on-stage as Father Ted and tell jokes involving his great friend, Father Dougal McGuire.

In 1991, Mathews left his job at Hot Press and moved into Linehan's London home. Over the next three to four years, they worked on rough ideas for shows while at the same time writing for sketch shows such as The All New Alexei Sayle Show and The Fast Show. One of these ideas was for a comedy mockumentary series called Irish Lives, with six episodes, each focusing on a different character living somewhere in Ireland. They scripted an episode centring on a priest named Father Ted Crilly, who visits his friends in the seminary in Maynooth College. Producer Geoffrey Perkins suggested that the episode's concept be dramatised and rewritten as a sitcom.

We wanted to make an Irish sitcom with all the insanity of The Young Ones, and the cleverness of Blackadder, and the farce elements of Fawlty Towers. These were the things that we grew up loving.

— Graham Linehan, Small, Far Away: The World of Father Ted, 1 January 2011

In the January 1994 issue of In Dublin (Vol 19, No2), Mathews and Linehan told Damian Corless, who had initially introduced the pair to each other, of their work in progress, describing Ted as "basically a nice man", Dougal as "nice but really stupid" and Jack as "a hideous creature". Linehan revealed: "They've all been sent to this isolated place called Craggy Island because they're crap priests." Mathews elaborated: "They've each a terrible secret which is why they've been banished to this place, and the terrible thing is that they can't get away from each other. Obviously it's not entirely reality-based." Mathews was originally intended to play Ted, but decided he lacked the acting ability the role required. Maurice O'Donoghue, who plays Father Dick in the series, was their second choice for the role of Ted, being the right age and having a similar look and lightness. Mathews always preferred Dermot Morgan; Linehan was initially reluctant, worrying that some viewers would be confused because they already knew him as "Father Trendy", another priest character that he had played many years before on the RTÉ television show The Live Mike. Morgan was very excited about the Father Ted role, and he repeatedly phoned the series creators and let them know how much he wanted it, which eventually won Linehan over because he figured that if Dermot wanted the role so badly then he would end up putting a lot of passion into doing a great job with it.

The show was pitched directly to the UK's Hat Trick Productions and Channel 4 by the duo, contrary to rumours that RTÉ (the Irish national broadcaster) were originally offered the series but rejected it.

=== Recording ===
Three series and one Christmas special were aired. Declan Lowney directed the first two series and the Christmas special, while the third series was directed by Linehan (location scenes) and Andy De Emmony (studio scenes). In addition, Morgan and O'Hanlon hosted an hour of Comic Relief in character, during which Kelly and McLynn also made brief guest appearances. One day after the shooting of series three wrapped, Dermot Morgan died of a heart attack, aged 45. As a mark of respect, the third series was first broadcast a week later than originally planned.

The show was already scheduled to conclude with the third series prior to Morgan's death, as Morgan said that he did not want to continue playing the role of Father Ted for fear of being typecast: "I don't want to be the next Clive Dunn and end up playing the same character for years."

Following Morgan's death, the production company received calls from numerous agents and casting directors suggesting either new actors for the role of Ted or spin-offs without the character; Linehan and Mathews declined all offers.

=== Music ===
In 1994, the writers asked alternative rock band Pulp to compose the theme music for Father Ted, requesting a parody of a typical sitcom theme. When Pulp said no, they contacted Neil Hannon, frontman of Northern Irish chamber pop band the Divine Comedy. Hannon's first effort, a jaunty composition, was rejected on Geoffrey Perkins's advice. Hannon composed a second theme, which the team found acceptable. This theme was recorded by Hannon and co-producer Darren Allison at The Jesus and Mary Chain's private studio. One of William Reid's guitars was selected by Allison and Hannon to carry the main tune, which was played by Hannon. Both themes were also reworked, with new lyrics, for inclusion on The Divine Comedy's 1996 album Casanova: the final Father Ted theme became "Songs of Love", while Hannon's rejected theme became "A Woman of the World".

In 2010, Linehan discussed the dramatic effect this choice had on the tone of the series: "'Woman of the World' was kind of like a jaunty, plinky-plonky song, and we wanted that song. He [Hannon] gave us two choices: he gave us that, and 'Songs of Love', and we wanted the plinky-plonky song because our idea was we were making fun of sitcoms. We were saying, you know, we don't like sitcoms. This is a parody of sitcoms. This is a kind of satire on sitcoms. And I remember Geoffrey [Perkins] looking really glum and sad about this, you know? And then he said, 'Why do you want to make fun of your characters?' He said, 'People will love these characters.' And that was just a real revelation for me, and after that, whatever he said went, as far as I was concerned."

The Divine Comedy also contributed most of the show's original music, including the songs "Big Men in Frocks" (for the episode "Rock-a-Hula Ted"), "My Lovely Horse" and "The Miracle is Mine" (for "A Song for Europe"), and "My Lovely Mayo Mammy" (for "Night of the Nearly Dead"). Hannon also provided Ted and Dougal's vocals in the dream sequence version of "My Lovely Horse", which was produced by Allison and Hannon, and later appeared as a B-side on the band's single "Gin Soaked Boy".

=== Location ===
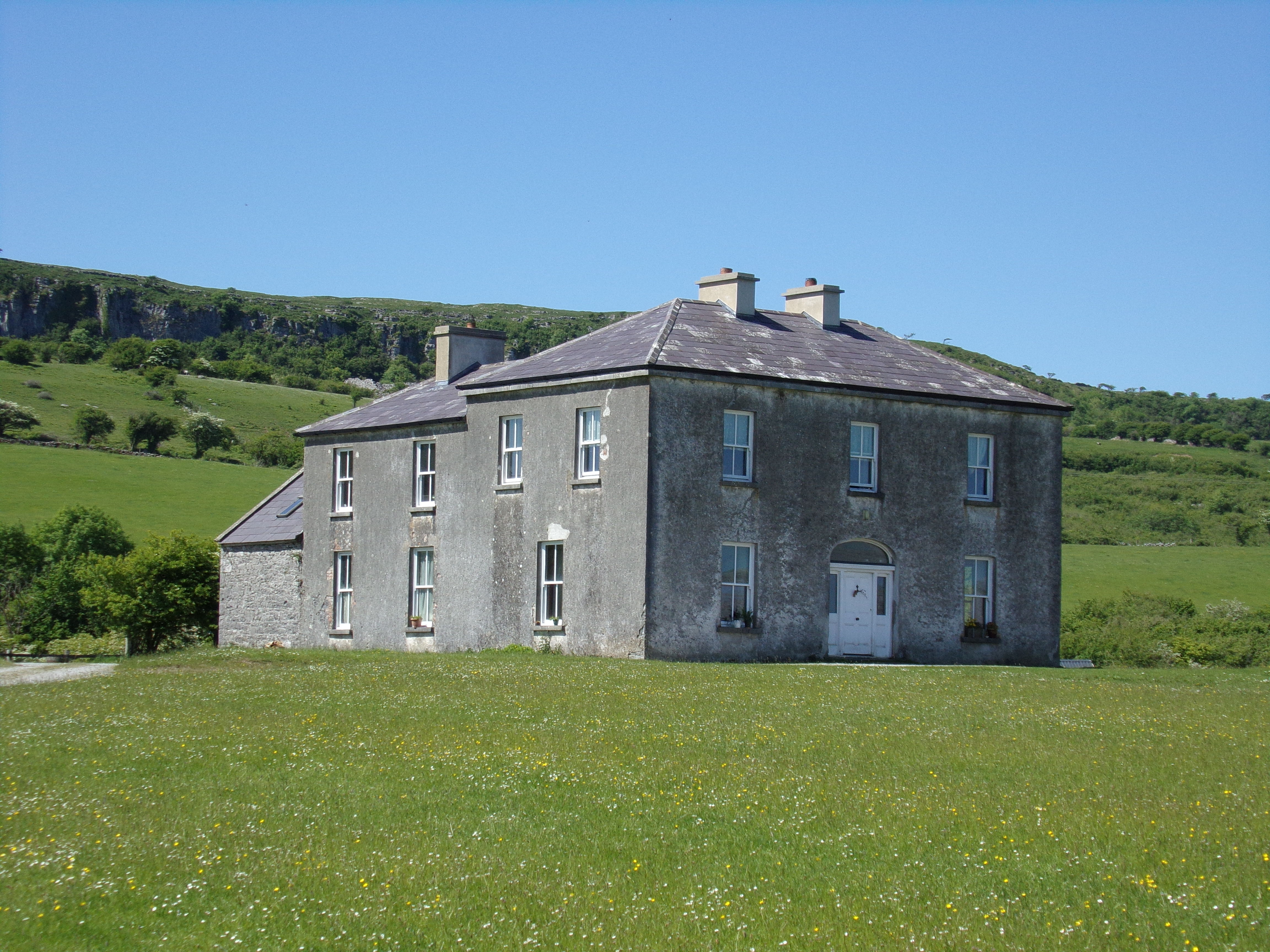
The farmhouse in the Burren northeast of Kilnaboy which was used for external shots of the parochial house (pictured in 2016)

The interior scenes were recorded at the London Studios in front of a live studio audience, while exterior filming was at various locations in Ireland. Location work for Father Ted was done mostly in County Clare, including locations at Corofin, Ennis, Kilfenora, Ennistymon, and Kilnaboy. The Parochial House is McCormack's at Glenquin, ( 53°00’35.1″N 9°01’48.2″W ) on the Boston road from Kilnaboy. The cinema featured in "The Passion of St Tibulus" was the Ormonde Cinema, Greystones, County Wicklow and "The Field", the location for Funland in "'Good Luck, Father Ted'", is in Portrane, North County Dublin. The 'Very Dark Caves' featured in "The Mainland" were the Aillwee caves in the Burren, County Clare.

Some exterior shots for the episode "And God Created Woman" were filmed in Dún Laoghaire, South County Dublin. The opening sequence (including shots of the Plassy shipwreck) were filmed over Inisheer — the smallest of the Aran Islands.

== Comedic style ==
The series is set in a humorously surreal world in which Ted is the only fully rounded normal character among "caricatures", according to Graham Linehan: "exaggerated-over-friendly, over-quiet, over-stupid, over-dull [...] they really only got one thing, they've got one job."

Embarrassment plays a role in many storylines, in a similar fashion to Fawlty Towers. Linehan says, "if Ted is in a situation that is slightly embarrassing we get him out of it [...] by having him lying or cheating, basically digging a massive hole for himself". Arthur Mathews has described Seinfeld as a major influence on the comedy of Father Ted, with himself and Linehan being "big fans" of the show. Father Ted also contains references to pop culture, and some film parodies, such as the episode "Speed 3". An avid fan of Monty Python growing up, Linehan cited the ineffectual protest of Monty Python's Life of Brian upon its release in 1979 as an influence for the Father Ted episode "The Passion of Saint Tibulus".

Regarding the series's religious content, Linehan says "Ted doesn't have an anti-religious view of life, but a non-religious view. It's a job to him. He doesn't care about religion." While writing, he says the show's creators imagined Ted and Dougal as "just two people who happen to be [priests]".

== Reception and legacy ==
Father Ted was met with critical acclaim and is the most popular sitcom in Irish TV history. The Irish media frequently uses the series as a point of comparison in political stories.

In 1996 and 1999, the show won the BAFTA award for Best Comedy, while Morgan also won Best Comedy Performance. In 1995 the show won Best New TV Comedy at the British Comedy Awards, with O'Hanlon receiving Top TV Comedy Newcomer Award. At the 1996 British Comedy Awards the show won Top Channel 4 Sitcom Award, McLynn took the Top TV Comedy Actress award. In 1997 the show was given the Best Channel 4 Sitcom Award. It was also ranked at number 50 in the BFI's 2000 list of the 100 greatest British television programmes of the 20th century, the highest ranking Channel 4 production on the list. In 2004, it came 11th in the poll for Britain's Best Sitcom. In August 2012, Channel 4 viewers voted the series as the No 1 in C4's 30 Greatest Comedy Shows.

Celebrity fans of the show include film director and producer Steven Spielberg, musicians Liam Gallagher, Madonna, Cher and Moby, actors Jim Carrey and Steve Martin, comedian Ricky Gervais, and wrestler Sheamus. Maurice Gibb of the Bee Gees was buried with a copy of the DVD box set. Singer-songwriter Sinéad O'Connor was a fan, and attended the filming of the Christmas special. Irish musician Bono also requested to appear in the series.

In January 2007, a dispute arose between Inisheer and Inishmore over which island can claim to be Craggy Island, and thereby host a three-day Friends of Ted Festival. The dispute was settled by a five-a-side football match that February. Inishmore won 2–0 allowing them to use the title of Craggy Island until February 2008, while Inisheer was given the title of Rugged Island. The Friends of Ted Festival, better known as Ted Fest, has been held annually as a Father Ted fan convention since 2007.

In August 2020, An Post released a set of commemorative postage stamps, each with a catchphrase from the series on a background of the parochial house's lurid wallpaper, in a booklet listing Mrs Doyle's guesses for the name of Father Todd Unctious.

Several quotes from the series have entered the popular lexicon, such as: "These are small, but the ones out there are far away. Small. Far away.", "Down with this sort of thing", "Careful now", "That would be an ecumenical matter" and "I hear you're a racist now, Father".

In 2026, Irish public broadcaster RTÉ announced they would counterprogramme the episode "A Song for Europe" on RTÉ2 during the Eurovision Song Contest 2026, due to the Irish delegation boycotting the contest over Israeli participation. This was met with opposition from the show's co-creator Graham Linehan, who accused the broadcaster of antisemitism.

== Derivatives ==
On 1 January 2011, Channel 4 dedicated a night of programmes to celebrate the show's 15th anniversary year. This included "Father Ted: Unintelligent Design", a documentary on the show's influences, and "Small, Far Away: The World of Father Ted", a documentary revisiting the show's history with the writers and many of the surviving cast (Pauline McLynn was unable to take part as she was working in another country).

=== Roles reprised ===
In 2001, Pauline McLynn reprised her role as Mrs Doyle in a run of advertisements for the UK's Inland Revenue, reminding people to get their taxes in on time with her catchphrase from the programme ("Go on, go on, go on..."). It was voted in an Adwatch poll of 1,000 people as the year's worst advertisement.

Later in 2001, Ardal O'Hanlon returned to the role of Father Dougal for a series of PBS advertisements to coincide with Father Ted's American broadcast; these segments were included on later DVD releases as "Fundraising with Father Dougal".

In 2012, Frank Kelly made a brief appearance as Father Jack on an episode of The One Show with Graham Norton.

In 2014, guest star Ben Keaton returned to the role of Father Austin Purcell, performing a stand-up routine and hosting the pub quiz "Arse Biscuits" in-character. In 2015, he launched the spin-off web series Cook Like a Priest.

In February 2016, Over the Top Wrestling marked the anniversary of Morgan's death with "Ah Ted", an event held in Dublin's Tivoli Variety Theatre. During the main-event tag-team match between The Lads From the Flats and The Kings of the North, Patrick McDonnell, Joe Rooney and Michael Redmond reprised their roles as Eoin McLove, Father Damo Lennon and Father Paul Stone respectively. McLove entered the ring first, withstanding one wrestler's attack on his crotch because he has "no willy", but was soon attacked by Father Damo, who brought the whistle he stole from Benson. Father Stone served as a special guest referee, performing a three-count so slow that one wrestler kicked out after two. In 2017, Rooney appeared as Father Damo in the video for Brave Giant's "The Time I Met the Devil", which follows him on the way to give Mass after a night of alcohol and sex.

=== Potential remakes ===
Several attempts to remake Father Ted have been reported. In July 2003, it was announced that the show would be remade for the American market. The remake would be scripted by Spike Feresten, who previously wrote for U.S. sitcoms Seinfeld and The Simpsons. Ferensten stated: "I was raised Catholic and this show just felt right to me. The essence of the show is about men who are also priests and, as men, they have many foibles." Hat Trick founders Denise O'Donoghue and Jimmy Mulville were set to produce. The U.S. production company was Pariah Productions, which previously adapted The Kumars at No. 42 for an American audience.

In March 2004, Supanet Limited reported that an American remake was in development. This version would be set on a fictional island off the coast of New York. Steve Martin and Graham Norton would reportedly play Ted and Dougal. Martin had not been expected to take the role because of his stature, but agreed because he was a fan of the original series, and would reportedly be paid £500,000 per episode. Norton was cast based on his popularity with American audiences, and in reference to his appearance as Father Noel Furlong in the original series.

In November 2007, a separate American remake was announced. Rather than Craggy Island, this version would be set in an unfortunate fishing village in New England. American actor John Michael Higgins was cast as Ted, but expressed concerns about the show's religious themes: "The English have a very robust history of being unkind about religion. We don't have that in our country, we're frightened of it. It's basically that you guys are doing an Irish joke also, we don't have that. So I'll be Father Ted, we'll see how it goes." Filming was scheduled to begin in January 2008.

In January 2015, Linehan said that there had been "a few attempts" by U.S. broadcasters to remake the show, including one which would have been set in Boston – an idea Linehan considered "ridiculous".

=== Cancelled musical ===
In an interview with Radio Times in January 2015, Linehan said that he wanted to revive Father Ted as a musical stage production. He stated that he would never revive the television series, "because of the risk you poison people's memories of the original", but that the completely new format would make the project worthwhile. He mentioned the possibility of a dance number with "spinning cardinals". He said that the musical would have to reference the Catholic child abuse scandals, saying, "The jokes would have to have a little bit more edge, because you just can't ignore this stuff." Mathews was "not as convinced" of the musical idea, though Linehan insisted it could work.

In December, Mathews said that he and Paul Woodfull were developing a Joshua Trio musical and a show focusing on a "Father Michael Cleary-type character", and that the Father Ted musical may follow. He expressed concerns that it would "dilute the product" or be seen as a "cash-in", but said that he believed there was an audience for the project. In April 2017, Linehan said that the musical would draw inspiration from The Book of Mormon, and would "go for the jugular ... You get all the things people loved about it, all the innocence and all the sweetness, but introduce a harder edge." Linehan also said that, being a special event, the musical would need to focus on a "world-shaking" story, possibly with Ted becoming Pope due to "some weird succession thing".

In June 2018, Linehan announced that Pope Ted: The Father Ted Musical was nearing completion, with a script by Linehan and Mathews. Linehan said, "It's the real final episode of Father Ted ... This was the right idea. Arthur and I have been laughing our arses off while writing it. Just like the old days." The music was composed by Neil Hannon, who wrote the television show's music. Asked about its potential to be a hit musical, Hannon said, "We are certainly aiming for a big West End show."

In March 2022, Linehan said the musical had been cancelled by producers following the controversy over his public statements about transgender rights. He said that the musical was "ready to go", with a completed story and songs, but "just because a group of people have decided that anybody who speaks up against this ideology is evil, [the producers have] just kind of rolled over for those people. No one is standing up for me." Hannon, a longtime friend of Linehan's, said the project was difficult and said about the controversy around Linehan: "It's been difficult to watch what's happened. I believe in free speech, but I also very much believe in people's perfect right to remain completely silent on issues that they don't feel they can speak on. And that's all I want to say about it." In a podcast released in May 2025, Jimmy Mulville of Hat Trick Productions said he had offered to buy the rights to Father Ted from Linehan to proceed with the musical. Linehan refused, saying that the musical would not be made.

== Home video ==
VHS releases
Title	Release date		Features
Title	United Kingdom	North America	Features
Series 1 – The Opening Chapters (Volume 1)	21 October 1996	15 May 2001	Series 1, episodes 1–3
Series 1 – The Closing Chapters (Volume 2)	21 October 1996	15 May 2001	Series 1, episodes 4–6
The Second Sermon – Chapter 1 (Volume 3)	20 October 1997	5 March 2002	Series 2, episodes 1–3
The Second Sermon – Chapter 2 (Volume 4)	20 October 1997	5 March 2002	Series 2, episodes 4–6
The Very Best of Father Ted	30 October 1998	No release	Series 1, episode 4; Series 2, episode 5; Series 2, episode 8; Series 3, episode 3; Series 3, episode 4
5 Hilarious Episodes	12 November 1999	No release	Series 2, episodes 6–10; includes "A Christmassy Ted"
The Final Revelations	24 November 2000	No release	Series 3, episodes 1–8 (complete)
The Complete 1st Series	20 August 2001	No release	Series 1, episodes 1–6
Series 2 – Part 1	15 October 2001	No release	Series 2, episodes 1–5; "A Christmassy Ted"
Series 2 – Part 2	25 February 2002	No release	Series 2, episodes 6–10
The Complete 3rd Series	6 May 2002	No release	Series 3, episodes 1–8
A Christmassy Ted	No release	17 September 2002	
The Very Best of Father Ted (re-release)	18 November 2002	No release	Series 1, episode 4; Series 2, episode 5; Series 2, episode 8; Series 3, episode 3; Series 3, episode 4

DVD releases
Title	Release date			Features
Title	Region 1	Region 2	Region 4	Features
The Complete 1st Series	5 June 2001	20 August 2001	18 August 2003	Series 1, episodes 1–6; Special features: Writer's commentary by Graham Linehan
Series 2 – Part 1	5 March 2002 (released complete)	15 October 2001	22 September 2003	Series 2, episodes 1–5; "A Christmassy Ted" (Regions 2 & 4 only); Special features: Writer's commentary by Graham Linehan; Note: Released as a complete series on Region 1 and doesn't include the Christmas special
Series 2 – Part 2	5 March 2002 (released complete)	25 February 2002	22 September 2003	Series 2, episodes 6–10; Special features: Commentary by Graham Linehan & Ardal O'Hanlon; Note: Released as a complete series on Region 1 and doesn't include the Christmas special
The Complete 3rd Series	4 March 2003	20 May 2002	17 September 2004	Series 3, episodes 1—8; "A Christmassy Ted" (Region 1 only); Special features: Craggy Island Memories; Dougal's Favourite Sound Effects; Gallery
The Very Best of Father Ted	No release	18 November 2002	No release	Series 1, episode 4; Series 2, episode 5; Series 2, episode 8; Series 3, episode 3; Series 3, episode 4; "A Christmassy Ted" (exclusive to DVD); Special features: Selected commentaries by Graham Linehan & Ardal O'Hanlon; Craggy Island Memories; Gallery
A Christmassy Ted	No release	19 October 2009	No release	Special features: Commentary by Graham Linehan
Complete series & re-release sets
The Complete Series	No release	4 November 2002	No release	Series 1–3 & "A Christmassy Ted"; Special features: Writer's commentary by Graham Linehan; Commentary by Graham Linehan & Ardal O'Hanlon; Craggy Island Memories; Dougal's Favourite Sound Effects; Gallery
The Holy Trilogy	17 February 2004	No release	No release	Series 1–3 & "A Christmassy Ted"; Special features: Interviews with Graham Linehan and Arthur Mathews, and Ardal O'Hanlon; Audio commentaries with Graham Linehan and Ardal O'Hanlon; Fundraising with Father Dougal; Father Ted and Dougal host Comic Relief; Cast and crew biographies; Photo galleries and production notes
The Definitive Collection	19 February 2008	29 October 2007	5 November 2009	Series 1–3 & "A Christmassy Ted"; Special features: Commentaries (Graham Lineham, Arthur Mathews, Ardal O'Hanlon, Fr. Tim Shuttlewoode and Fr, Chris Claycee); Interview with the writers Part 1; Interview with the writers Part 2; Ted Fest 2007: A Very Ted Weekend; Ted Fest 2007: Two Tribes Go to War; Biographies; Photo Gallery; Comedy Connections; Comic Relief with Ted and Dougal; Craggy Island Memories; Dougal's Sound Effects Gallery
The Complete Boxset	No release	12 November 2012	No release	Series 1–3 & "A Christmassy Ted"; Special features: Brand new commentaries from Graham Linehan & Arthur Mathews; Interview with writers; Small, Far Away – The World of Father Ted; Channel 4's 30 Greatest Comedy Shows; Ted Fest 2007: A Very Ted Weekend; Comedy Connections; Comic Relief with Ted and Dougal; Ted Fest 2007: Two Tribes Go to War; Exclusive Father Ted prints designed by Tony Millionaire
Series 1	No release	11 March 2013	4 March 2010	Series 1, episodes 1–6
Series 2	No release	11 March 2013	4 March 2010	Series 2, episodes 1–10; "A Christmassy Ted"
Series 3	No release	11 March 2013	4 March 2010	Series 3, episodes 1–8
The Complete Boxset (slimline)	No release	14 October 2019	No release	Series 1–3 & "A Christmassy Ted"; Special features: Brand new commentaries from Graham Linehan & Arthur Mathews; Interview with writers; Small, Far Away – The World of Father Ted; Channel 4's 30 Greatest Comedy Shows; Ted Fest 2007: A Very Ted Weekend; Comedy Connections; Comic Relief with Ted and Dougal; Ted Fest 2007: Two Tribes Go to War; Exclusive Father Ted prints designed by Tony Millionaire

== See also ==
- British sitcom
