= Arthur Mathews (writer) =

Irish writer and actor

- Born: Termonfeckin, County Louth, Ireland
- Education: Castleknock College, Dublin Institute of Technology
- Occupations: Comedy writer; actor

Arthur Mathews is an Irish comedy writer and actor. With writers including Graham Linehan, Paul Woodfull and Matt Berry, he co-created and co-wrote the television comedies Father Ted, Big Train and Toast of London, and contributed to comedy shows including Harry Enfield and Chums, The Fast Show, The Day Today, and Brass Eye.

== Early life ==
Mathews attended Castleknock College, a private school run by Vincentian priests. He then graduated from the Dublin Institute of Technology with a degree in graphic design. He played drums in spoof U2 tribute act "The Joshua Trio" with Paul Woodfull, with whom he would later work on I, Keano. He worked as art editor for Hot Press, leaving in 1991 to move to London.

== Writing career ==
=== Television ===
Mathews has contributed to sketch shows including Harry Enfield and Chums, The All New Alexei Sayle Show and the Ted & Ralph segments of The Fast Show.

However, it was with Father Ted (three series, 1995–1998) that he and Graham Linehan made their biggest impression. It debuted on Channel 4. The writing partnership had previously co-written the comedy Paris (one series, 1994), also for Channel 4.

Both Linehan and Mathews worked on the first series of sketch show Big Train, but Linehan dropped out for the second series. Mathews has also written for other British comedies such as Brass Eye, Jam and Black Books, and later contributed sketches to It's Kevin, including the Amish Sex Pistols.

In 1999, Linehan and Mathews created the sixties-set sitcom Hippies, but the six-part series (which starred Simon Pegg and Sally Phillips) was written by Mathews alone. In late 2003, Linehan and Mathews were named one of the 50 funniest acts to work in television by The Observer. In 2012, Matthews co-created Toast of London with Matt Berry, which ran for three series (2013–2015), with a fourth, titled Toast of Tinseltown, appearing in 2022.

=== Theatre ===
In 2005, Mathews, with Michael Nugent and Paul Woodfull, co-wrote I, Keano, a comedy musical play about footballer Roy Keane leaving the Republic of Ireland national football team before the 2002 FIFA World Cup.

It is presented as a mock-epic melodrama about an ancient Roman legion preparing for war. In its first two years, over half a million people watched it, generating €10m ($13m) in ticket sales. In January 2008, it began its fourth year of performances. He confirmed in 2018 that he and Linehan were working together on a Father Ted musical.

=== Non-fiction ===
In 2024, Mathews wrote the book Walled in by Hate: Kevin O'Higgins, His Friends and Enemies. This was a biography of the Irish politician Kevin O'Higgins.

== Television appearances ==
Linehan and Mathews appeared in the sitcom I'm Alan Partridge as two Irish television producers considering hiring Alan Partridge as a presenter. Mathews later starred in I Am Not an Animal, an animated comedy series about talking animals written by Peter Baynham.

Mathews also made four appearances on Father Ted: as Father Billy Kerrigan in series 1, as one half of the picnic couple and as Father Ben in series 2, and as Father Clarke in series 3.

== See also ==
- List of Dublin Institute of Technology people

== Credits ==
=== Books ===
- Father Ted: The Craggy Island Parish Magazines (with Graham Linehan (Hardback – Boxtree – 18 September 1998) ISBN 0752224727
- Father Ted: The Complete Scripts (with Graham Linehan (Paperback – Boxtree – 20 October 2000) ISBN 0-7522-7235-7
- Well Remembered Days: Eoin O'Ceallaigh's Memoirs of a Twentieth-century Irish Catholic (Paperback – Macmillan – 9 March 2001) ISBN 0-333-90163-0.
- The Book of Poor Ould Fellas (with Declan Lynch). Hachette Books Ireland, Dublin, 2008. ISBN 9780340979181
- Toast on Toast: Cautionary tales and candid advice, a spoof autobiography of Steven Toast. 2015 (with Matt Berry).
- Notes from a Lost Tribe : the Poor Ould Fellas (with Declan Lynch). Hachette Books Ireland, Dublin, 2018. ISBN 9781473687301
- The Cummings Files Confidential : Thoughts, Ideas, Actions by Dominic Cummings. Faber and Faber, London, 2020. ISBN 9780571365838
- Walled in by hate : Kevin O'Higgins, his friends and enemies. Merrion Press, Newbridge, Co. Kildare, 2024. ISBN 9781785375118

=== Cartoons ===
- "Doctor Crawshaft's World of Pop", in NME (1992–93)
- "The chairman", in the Observer Sports Monthly (2003–04)
