= A Song for Europe (Father Ted) =

- Father Ted episode
- Father Dougal (left) and Father Ted (right)
- Episode no.: Series 2 Episode 5
- Directed by: Declan Lowney
- Written by: Graham Linehan; Arthur Mathews
- Cinematography by: Chris Owen
- Editing by: Mykola Pawluk; Tim Waddell
- Original air date: 5 April 1996

Guest appearances
- Maurice O'Donoghue as Father Dick Byrne; Don Wycherley as Father Cyril MacDuff; Peter Caffrey as Charles Hedges; Jon Kenny as Fred Rickwood

Episode chronology
← Previous "Old Grey Whistle Theft"	Next → "The Plague"

"A Song for Europe" is the fifth episode of the second series of the Channel 4 sitcom Father Ted and the 11th episode overall. It originally aired on 5 April 1996 and has since been recognised as one of the most popular episodes of the show.

== Synopsis ==
Dougal has "Eurosong fever" weeks ahead of the competition. After initially rejecting Dougal's suggestion that they write a song to represent Ireland in the competition, on the grounds that they are not skilled at songwriting, Ted discovers that his nemesis Father Dick Byrne plans to enter a song. Ted decides that if Byrne can write a song, he and Dougal can write a better one. After working all night, they come up with "My Lovely Horse", a tuneless dirge with ridiculous lyrics lasting less than a minute. When they try the song out on Mrs Doyle and Father Jack, Jack destroys Ted's guitar with a shotgun. Disillusioned, they are about to give up when Ted discovers that their lyrics fit a tune by "Nin Huugen and the Huugen Notes", an obscure B-side of an entry from the fifth-placed act in Norway's Eurosong preselection in 1976. Ted thinks that because the whole band had died in a plane crash, including all the record company staff and everyone involved in the copyright, they would get away with stealing it.

At the Dublin theatre where "A Song for Ireland" is being hosted, Ted and Dougal listen to Dick Byrne's entry, "The Miracle Is Mine". It is extremely impressive, with a full choir, huge band and a passionate performance from Byrne. Ted is worried and goes backstage for a smoke, where he hears the Norwegian tune being whistled by a maintenance worker, then playing in a lift. He is horrified, realising that the song is better known than he thought. He and Dougal are forced to adopt "Plan B" and perform their own composition.

In spite of Ted and Dougal's dismal performance, and against the obvious wishes of the audience, the producer, Charles Hedges, selects "My Lovely Horse" as Ireland's entry. He laughs off Byrne's suggestion that he deliberately chose the worst song to ensure that Ireland would lose, the country being in no position to host another song contest (Ireland won the real Eurovision Song Contest in 1992, 1993 and 1994 and had the costly obligation of hosting it in 1993, 1994 and 1995). The episode closes at the Eurosong contest, with Ted, Dougal, Jack and Mrs. Doyle listening to every country awarding them "nul points".

== Background and production ==
=== Inspiration ===
It has been widely claimed that this episode was inspired by real events surrounding Ireland's selection of its entry for the 1994 Eurovision Song Contest. Faced with the daunting and expensive task of hosting its third consecutive Eurovision, RTÉ were said to have chosen an inferior quality song (Paul Harrington & Charlie McGettigan's "Rock 'n' Roll Kids") over vastly superior ones, in order to prevent the possibility of an unwanted third victory. In the event, "Rock 'n' Roll Kids" not only won the contest but also became the highest scoring song in Eurovision history up to that point.

A month after the episode was first broadcast, Ireland won the 1996 Eurovision Song Contest to secure the country's fourth victory in five years. The Norwegian broadcaster NRK branded the 1996 contest as "Eurosong 96" in its logo.

=== "My Lovely Horse" ===
The song was written by Graham Linehan, Arthur Mathews and Neil Hannon of The Divine Comedy. It was produced by Darren Allison and Neil Hannon during sessions for The Divine Comedy's Casanova album and released on CD as a B-side to the band's 1999 single "Gin Soaked Boy".

== Video ==
According to the writer's commentary, the video for "My Lovely Horse" was based on a 1975 lifestyle video for "That's What Friends are For" by The Swarbriggs. The song was Ireland's entry for the 1975 Eurovision Song Contest, which they consider the funniest music video ever made. Some of the shots were recreated down to every last detail.

The outdoor sequences were shot in the grounds of the Falls Hotel in Ennistymon, County Clare, Ireland. In the background the cascade waterfall in Ennistymon can clearly be seen. Steve Coogan was intended to play compère Fred Rickwood but was unavailable, so Irish comic Jon Kenny was his replacement. Kenny had appeared in Father Ted previously, as Michael the cinema owner in "The Passion of St Tibulus".

== Legacy ==
The episode is often regarded as one of the most popular, appearing on the Best Of video, with one of the most memorable moments being the video for "My Lovely Horse".

In September 2001, O’Hanlon appeared onstage with American musician Moby at the Slane Festival to perform a duet of "My Lovely Horse".

In May 2014, a petition to make "My Lovely Horse" Ireland’s entry for the Eurovision Song Contest 2015 was formally submitted to the government, but was rejected by the Oireachtas petitions committee.

Irish all-male a cappella group, The Ramparts, performed a version of "My Lovely Horse" outside the Father Ted house in August 2024.

The series How to Get to Heaven from Belfast includes references to Father Ted, as the writer was a huge fan of the series. The Divine Comedy's version of "My Lovely Horse" appears in the final episode of season 1, and Ardal O’Hanlon and Michael Redmond (who played Father Stone in the Father Ted episode "Entertaining Father Stone") appear in multiple episodes.

== Irish boycott of Eurovision 2026 ==
In 2026, RTÉ announced they would broadcast a repeat of the episode on the night of the Eurovision Song Contest 2026, due to Ireland boycotting the event over the inclusion of Israel. Linehan accused RTÉ of antisemitism and disagreed with the episode being used in this way.
