= And God Created Woman (Father Ted) =

- Father Ted episode
- A group of nuns in the Craggy Island patriarchal house
- Episode no.: Series 1 Episode 5
- Directed by: Declan Lowney
- Written by: Graham Linehan; Arthur Mathews
- Original air date: 19 May 1995

Guest appearances
- Gemma Craven as Polly Clarke; Rosemary Henderson as Sister Assumpta; Pat Shortt as Tom

Episode chronology
← Previous "Competition Time"	Next → "Grant Unto Him Eternal Rest"

"And God Created Woman" is the 5th episode of the Channel 4 sitcom Father Ted. It is named after the 1956 film And God Created Woman.

== Synopsis ==
Father Ted meets novelist Polly Clarke at a booksigning for her latest novel, Bejewelled with Kisses, and they discuss their reading interests; Polly discloses that she envies Ted the peace of mind and serenity that his life as a priest brings. Ted rebuffs this, in a jovial manner, saying that he would actually like a bit of excitement. As he gets in the lift afterwards, Ted realises that Polly misheard his name and addressed the book to "Ted Curley" (not Crilly); Polly then steps into the elevator and greets him as "Father Curley". There is an awkward silence between them as the lift goes up, with the only ice-breaker "Good luck with the book again" as they walk off in separate directions. Their cars, however, are parked next to each other and, in a traffic jam, Polly's car pulls up alongside Ted's. Ted pleads with the traffic lights to change, again mouthing "good luck with the book" to Polly. As the lights change, Ted accelerates hastily and crashes into the car in front. The driver of the car then gets out and punches him in the nose.

When Ted arrives home, he finds Polly sitting in the living room; she has rented a cottage on Craggy Island, but it is not yet ready, and the builders suggested that she stay at the parochial house. Mrs Doyle then enters, looking disdainful of Polly's presence and less than polite towards her as she leads her to the spare room. Dougal, meanwhile, has been behind a chair, hiding from "your woman" because he would not know what to say to her. As Ted begins telling Dougal about Polly, a scream is heard from upstairs; Father Jack is in the spare room bed and is unprepared to move (Ted receives another punch in the nose for trying to move Jack). After they use a "calming" blue card to get Jack out of the room, Mrs Doyle tells Polly sarcastically to have a lovely stay.

The next day, Ted puts several highbrow novels on the table (along with The Commitments by Roddy Doyle), with the intention of impressing Polly (but Dougal takes this to mean that Ted is throwing out "the ones you couldn't get through"). Mrs Doyle tells Ted that she is not a fan of Polly's books, mainly because of "the language" in them; she gives examples of this, and ends up going on an angry rant that contains dozens of swear words.

Polly enters and tells Ted about her failed marriage, going into detail about her sex life with her husband; she suddenly realises she has shocked Ted, and apologises, although he maintains that he has heard far worse things in confession (he then walks uncomfortably to his seat, suggesting that he has an erection). They discuss, at length, literature such as Dostoevsky and Wilde; Ted is out of his depth but bumbles through without Polly noticing this, and she invites him to come to her house that night for "some more book talk"; he accepts, although, realising what this implies, says "it's only a drink" to the picture of Jesus on the back of the settee, after Polly has left.

Ted then meets the group of nuns visiting Craggy Island, who are led by Sister Assumpta and seem starstruck, treating Ted more like a pop star. They have loved Ted's masses in the past, but Ted suddenly realises that his mass tonight is happening at the same time as his "date" at Polly's. Ted tries to lie to the nuns and say he will be visiting a sick friend, but this plan is scuppered when Dougal brings the supposedly dying "old Jim" into the house. Ted pretends that he was actually thinking of someone else, and says that he can do that evening's mass after all.

Ted instead decides to perform the mass very quickly and run off to meet Polly. But with his car improbably blocked-in by two parishioners, he has to get a lift from Tom, who stops off at the post office to rob it at gunpoint (although only because he "didn't want to fill out the forms" to withdraw his own money). Tom then crashes the car, so Ted arrives at Polly's house much later.

To his surprise, Polly is having a housewarming party (forgetting to mention this when she invited Ted), with Dougal, Jack, Mrs Doyle and the nuns. The nuns are disappointed that Ted's mass was so short (opting instead to attend the mass of a priest who, having suffered a stroke, now gives masses lasting three hours). After everyone has left, Polly tells Ted about the "crossroads" in her life, and says she thinks she has reached a decision; Ted says he will support whatever she chooses to do. However, when she reveals she is going to settle down into a peaceful life by becoming a nun, he is disappointed (although no longer feels awkward about telling her what his surname really is). His possible romance over, Ted returns home to the "daily grind" of pulling Dougal's head out of the settee, while Jack cackles dementedly.

== Production ==
Linehan was pleased with the episode, though Mathews felt that the storyline about a priest's discomfort with a woman coming into the community was too much like what a conventional sitcom would do. Linehan called the episode "terribly sad", stating that Ted should really be married to Polly, while Mathews acknowledged that they would probably get on quite well as a couple. Mathews had been impressed by Craven's work in Pennies from Heaven.

Polly's book title, Bejewelled with Kisses, was inspired by "A Blizzard of Tiny Kisses", the title of Clive James's review of Princess Daisy by Judith Krantz. Ted's awkward repeated meetings with Polly as they both leave the book shop was inspired by the writers' experience of continually meeting people at the BBC. The scene where a man punches Ted through his car window was the first scene filmed for the entire series.

Mrs Doyle's line "ride me sideways" was an ad-lib by McLynn; this moment features a mistake as Morgan accidentally pulls the set door in instead of opening it.

The joke where the door slowly closes as Ted says mass derives from the writers' rule that the audience would never see Ted doing mass, or any other official church business, since it "seemed to be the stuff of other priestly sitcoms"; while other series might have routines about "a secret in confession" or "something embarrassing happening during mass", Linehan wanted to make a show about what happens between those moments. Mathews also noted that the characters hate working, so they did not want to show this. This rule was broken once, for the third-series episode "Speed 3", because they thought the idea of Ted giving mass from a tractor was too good to pass up.

The "priest as pop star" Ted's nun fans were inspired by interviews Andi Peters hosted with young female fans, who would ask questions about embarrassing moments. Jack's intense fear of nuns was not followed up in subsequent episodes (except in "Cigarettes and Alcohol and Rollerblading", when he runs and crashes through the window upon seeing a nun); Linehan states that he was "just in a no-nuns mood that day". Linehan later expressed surprise that they had not brought Dr Synott into the scene where Ted is caught lying about several of his parishioners. The writers were pleased with Rose Henderson's performance, and her menacing reaction when told that Ted would be unable to give mass gave them the idea that Sister Assumpta had a "hidden fierceness"; the character was brought back as a sadomasochistic Lent enforcer in the second-series episode "Cigarettes and Alcohol and Rollerblading". The mass was filmed in an actual church, which would not have been allowed after the first series. Ted psyching himself up for the mass was a Raging Bull reference inserted by Linehan. Mathews drew inspiration from a story he had read about an Irish priest who got people from different parishes because he gave short masses.

The scene where Ted gets picked up by Tom was inspired by Thunderbolt and Lightfoot. In one scene, Thunderbolt (Clint Eastwood) is picked up by a crazed car driver (Bill McKinney) who opens the back of his truck to reveal a group of rabbits, which he then shoots; this character inspired the Tom character. In an early draft of the episode's script, the reference was more explicit, with Tom opening the back of his car to find rabbits. The car's sudden approach is an homage to a scene where a swordsman suddenly attacks a guard in Monty Python and the Holy Grail.
