= Hell (Father Ted) =

- Father Ted episode
- Episode no.: Series 2 Episode 1
- Directed by: Declan Lowney
- Written by: Graham Linehan; Arthur Mathews
- Editing by: Mykola Pawluk; Tim Waddell
- Original air date: 8 March 1996

Guest appearances
- Pat Shortt as Tom; Joe Taylor as Sewage Supervisor; Luke Hayden as Gerry Gleason; Ann Hayden as Mrs Gleason; Robert English as Policeman; Tony Guilfoyle as Father Larry Duff; Graham Norton as Father Noel Furlong; Tom Farrelly as Gerry Fields; Yvonne Shanley as Janine Reilly; Stephen Gallagher as Tony Lynch; Sharon Carroll as Nuala Ryan; Laura Bermingham as Woman on Yacht

Episode chronology
← Previous "Grant Unto Him Eternal Rest"	Next → "Think Fast, Father Ted"

"Hell" is the first episode of the second series of the Channel 4 sitcom Father Ted, and the seventh episode overall.

Graham Norton makes his first of three appearances as Father Noel Furlong in this episode.

== Plot ==
Tom, Craggy Island's resident eccentric, has been hired to transport a large tanker of raw sewage. Whilst being shown the truck's controls, his boss tells him about two buttons that, despite being near-identical and beside each other, control two completely different functions: one unlocks the doors on the truck cab, while the other releases the sewage from the tanker.

Meanwhile, it is 19 July and time for Ted, Dougal, and Jack to take their annual holiday. The three decide to go to the Kilkelly Caravan Park, where Ted's friend, Father O'Rourke, has offered them use of his caravan.

Following the vague directions, Ted mistakes a rather luxurious caravan for O'Rourke's, only to find it occupied by a young couple showering together - the husband comes out of the shower while talking to his wife and discovers the Fathers - the husband, in consequence, is, like the Fathers, left confused upon seeing them. After apologising profusely to the couple and the gardaí, Ted recognises that their caravan is a compact, squalid model, with barely enough room for the three of them. After the trio enter the caravan, Ted realises that Dougal not only forgot to hitch the trailer containing all of their games and entertainment, but also forgot to lock the front door. The scene then cuts to the Parochial House being looted by burglars.

After putting Jack to sleep via a cardboard "sleeping box" on his head, Ted and Dougal quickly exhaust all of their activities within the caravan, such as playing ridiculously easy hide-and-seek, repeatedly boiling the kettle (despite having no teabags) and Ted trying to explain the difference between "small" and "far away" with some toy cows. Pushing Jack in a wheelchair, they later explore the only two attractions nearby: St. Kevin's Stump (an ordinary tree stump whose name is never explained) and the Magic Road, where the laws of gravity seemingly disappear. While Ted and Dougal are distracted, Jack's wheelchair is dragged up the Magic Road, and he falls over a cliff, screaming a rather long "Drink!" as he descends - the exact whereabouts of Jack now are revealed with a slight splash sound as he falls; the other Fathers think Jack has just gone for his own walk. After Ted and Dougal inadvertently come across the same young couple from the luxury caravan making out behind a rock, Ted has another word with the police, and he decides to report Jack missing.

Ted and Dougal return to the caravan, only to find for themselves that Father O'Rourke has also promised its use to Father Noel Furlong and his youth group, who are cramped inside and having a sing-song. Noel's boundless energy quickly grates on Ted and confuses Dougal. Ted decides they will cut their holiday short, but before leaving, Ted and Dougal hide in an outhouse to avoid Gerry, the man from the luxury caravan, seeing them for a third time, and they realise too late that it is already in use by his wife. Hearing his wife's screams of terror, Gerry, clad only in a towel, chases after Ted and Dougal as they get into the car. Just as Ted is about to race away from the caravan park, Gerry grabs onto the bonnet and hangs there for most of the journey, with his towel becoming lost along the way. Ted eventually stops, sending Gerry flying into the road; furious, Gerry finds a glass bottle, smashes it, and proceeds to puncture the car's tyres before he gives the Fathers the finger and walks off. Ted and Dougal, refusing to go back to the park if Noel is still present, look to hitchhike home (In a cutaway, Noel and company are shown Irish river dancing, the intensity of which causes the caravan to topple over).

Ted and Dougal are elated when Tom, still transporting raw sewage, offers them a ride. However, he accidentally pushes the button to release the sewage, treating the Fathers to a foul drenching, which he apologises for.

Meanwhile, Jack is later shown on a luxury yacht - as he regains consciousness, he discovers that he is surrounded by "drink" and beautiful "girls" - he has awakened in the company of two of his favourite temptations.

The credits play over Ted and Dougal in the caravan, playing another ridiculously easy game of hide and seek, with Dougal failing to find Ted.

== Production ==
The caravan site is located at Fanore Beach, County Clare, on the west coast of Ireland.

The writers based the episode on their own childhood experiences. The caravan park was based on Graham Linehan's memories of being taken on two-week-long holidays to grim caravan parks where it would always rain and there would be a plentiful supply of children to bully him. He would describe it as a "holiday in Hell", hence the episode's title. The unusual attractions such as the Magic Road were based on real-life locations Arthur Mathews had visited.

During the filming of the scene in "Entertaining Father Stone", in which the priests play crazy golf in a rainstorm, which caused the actors to get soaking wet, Dermot Morgan joked that next time the writers would probably get them covered in raw sewage. This is the entire reason why the scene where Ted and Dougal are sprayed with sewage was written. The actors did not realise that the substance made up to look like sewage was extremely cold; this caused them to run away from it very quickly when it was sprayed on them, and the writers to feel guilty about making them do it.

== Legacy ==
This episode includes one of the show's more memorable scenes, where Ted is trying to explain perspective to Dougal while in the caravan. In it, Ted says "These [holding up toy cows] are small... but the ones out there [pointing to real cows in a distant field] are far away. Small... far away... ah forget it!" The scene is considered one of the show's most iconic, and was named as the third-best one-liner of any British sitcom in a January 2017 survey by The Daily Telegraph. The line was used as the title of Small, Far Away: The World of Father Ted, a documentary of the show created by writers Graham Linehan and Arthur Mathews for the 15th anniversary of the show's premiere. The scene was not present in the original script, and was written in to replace a scene in which Ted attempted and failed to teach Dougal how to play noughts and crosses.
