= List of Father Ted characters =

The four main characters of Father Ted. Middle rear: Father Ted Crilly (Dermot Morgan), left: Father Dougal McGuire (Ardal O'Hanlon), front: Father Jack Hackett (Frank Kelly), right: Mrs Doyle (Pauline McLynn).

Father Ted is a sitcom produced by independent production company Hat Trick Productions for British broadcaster Channel 4. Its three series, comprising 25 episodes and a special, originally aired from 21 April 1995 to 1 May 1998. Its main characters, Father Ted Crilly (Dermot Morgan) and his fellow priests Father Dougal McGuire (Ardal O'Hanlon) and Father Jack Hackett (Frank Kelly), were exiled to Craggy Island, where they lived with the fourth main character, housekeeper Mrs Doyle (Pauline McLynn). All four actors appeared from the series' first episode, "Good Luck, Father Ted", to its last, "Going to America". Pauline McLynn also played a nun in the episode "Flight Into Terror", in which Mrs Doyle appears only briefly.

== Main characters ==
=== Father Ted Crilly ===
Father Ted Crilly, played by Dermot Morgan, is a morally dubious Roman Catholic priest exiled to Craggy Island under suspicion of stealing money intended to fund a child's pilgrimage to Lourdes and using it, instead, to pay for his own trip to Las Vegas. He is later transferred to a comfortable Dublin parish, only to soon be sent straight back to Craggy Island after a church accountant discovers irregularities in his church expenses claims.

=== Father Dougal McGuire ===
Father Dougal McGuire, played by Ardal O'Hanlon, is a childlike, simple-minded Catholic priest exiled as punishment for "the Blackrock incident". It is unclear how he entered the priesthood, or indeed why he is a priest as he seems to have no religious beliefs whatsoever. (Ted asks him, "Dougal, how did you get into the church? Was it, like, collect 12 crisp packets and become a priest?"). In episode 6 of series 1, we find out that Dougal lost his two parents and his uncle while giving the last rites.

=== Father Jack Hackett ===
Father Jack Hackett
- Father Ted character
- First appearance: "Good Luck, Father Ted" (1995)
- Last appearance: "Going to America" (1998)
- Created by: Arthur Mathews; Graham Linehan
- Portrayed by: Frank Kelly

In-universe information
- Occupation: Priest
- Religion: Roman Catholic
- Home: Craggy Island Parochial House, Craggy Island, County Clare, Ireland
- Nationality: Irish

Father Jack Hackett, played by Frank Kelly, is an elderly, foul-mouthed, alcoholic priest whose vocabulary consists largely of the shouted words "feck", "arse", "drink" and "girls". He usually shouts whenever he speaks, although he speaks in a much calmer tone when offered alcohol. He is also capable of identifying a bottle of wine, as well as its vintage, just from the sound of the bottle clinking. While it is never explicitly stated why Bishop Brennan has condemned him to Craggy Island, in the episode "The Passion of Saint Tibulus" it is implied that it has something to do with a wedding ceremony Jack performed in Athlone. In "Tentacles of Doom", with the promise of more "drink", Ted trains Jack to say "That would be an ecumenical matter!" and "Yes!" so that he may convincingly circumvent any questions put to him by a party of visiting bishops. Jack has a fear of nuns; in the episode "Cigarettes and Alcohol and Rollerblading", upon seeing Sister Assumpta and learning that she is a nun, he runs screaming out of the window. He regards the sick and poor with contempt, referring to them as a "shower of bastards". It is later revealed, in his will, that he saved up £500,000, which Ted attributes partly to Jack's "never giving money to charity" and that "he wouldn't wear trousers during the summer".

Jack can be violent. For example, in "The Passion of Saint Tibulus", when Bishop Brennan wakes him up, Jack punches him in the face while shouting "Feck off!", while in the episode "The Mainland", Jack is arrested for assaulting and hospitalising a man he had met at an Alcoholics Anonymous meeting he'd accidentally attended, after the man saw him in a pub and tried to stop him from drinking. He is also shown to have a habit of destroying the television by throwing bottles containing alcohol at it and blowing it up, leading to Ted telling Dougal not to turn the television on when Jack is sleeping in the room.

Although Jack is an alcoholic, his drinking is not limited to alcohol; he will drink almost any liquid he can get his hands on, except for water or tea, which he despises. Over the course of the series, he is revealed to have drunk Toilet Duck (which made him hallucinate, seeing pink elephants and the people around him as bizarre oddities), floor polish (which slowed down his metabolism to the point that everyone thought he was dead), brake fluid (which exacerbated his "Hairy Hands Syndrome"), anointing oil, Harpic and Windolene.

Jack has very bad personal hygiene. This is evident from his unkempt hair, scabs near his mouth, stains on his clerical collar and decaying teeth. His chair also has a large stain behind his head. Ted once panicked when he thought that the time of the year for Jack's bath was approaching, however, to Ted's utmost relief, he remembers it had been performed over six months prior. Jack also has a variety of smells, including vegetables, which attracted rabbits (which he refers to as "rats" and "hairy Japanese bastards") in the episode "The Plague", and "wee", according to a visiting Eoin McLove in Night of the Nearly Dead. Jack once locked Father Jessup in his underpants hamper, where Jessup was tormented by the extreme smell. Mrs Doyle wears a helmet when clipping Jack's nails, as does everyone else in the room.

Jack is usually in his chair, often sleeping, and is rarely active. In the episode "Escape from Victory", it emerges that Jack slept for 14 days straight after drinking a whole bottle of an alcoholic sleeping aid known as "Dreamy Sleepy Nightie Snoozy Snooze", which is banned in most European countries. When he has to be brought out of his chair, he usually has to be put in a wheelchair, which is generally pushed by someone else. He has a walking stick with him when he is in his chair, although he is able to walk (and even run) without it.

Jack is prone to hearing loss caused by a build-up of wax in his ears, which the other priests use to make candles. However, he is shown to be able to hear just fine when Ted offers him a glass of brandy. He also has a cataract in his left eye.

In the episode "Cigarettes and Alcohol and Rollerblading", Ted observes that Jack has not been properly sober for 12 years. When he briefly awakens from his drunken state, Ted having made him give up alcohol for Lent, he is startled to find that Dougal and Ted are the only ones in the room with him, demanding "Where are the other two?", suggesting he usually sees double. Soon afterwards, he realises to his horror that he is "still on that feckin' island".

In "The Craggy Island Parish Magazines" (a book representing a collection of copies of the fictional "Our Parish" parochial magazine), it is stated that Father Jack served as chaplain to the fictional Paraguayan leader General Guillermo Paz for three years in the 1950s, until he left hours before Paz was hanged from a lemon tree by a group of peasants during an uprising. It is also stated that before he became a priest, Hackett had many varied careers, including captaining a ship.

=== Mrs Doyle ===
Mrs Doyle
- Father Ted character
- First appearance: "Good Luck, Father Ted" (1995)
- Last appearance: "Going to America" (1998)
- Created by: Arthur Mathews; Graham Linehan
- Portrayed by: Pauline McLynn

In-universe information
- Occupation: Housekeeper
- Religion: Roman Catholic
- Home: Craggy Island Parochial House, Craggy Island, County Clare, Ireland
- Nationality: Irish

Mrs Doyle, played by Pauline McLynn, is the parish priests' housekeeper. Her first name is not mentioned on the show, but is given as Joan in the draft Competition Time script. Whenever a character speaks her first name, background noise suddenly erupts, masking whatever is being said. This gag was repeated in Tedfest 2007 when Graham Linehan was going to reveal her first name in a transmission but his voice was masked by the sound of breaking glass. In the DVD commentary with Arthur Matthews in the episode Old Grey Whistle Theft Linehan stated that they 'did have a name for Mrs Doyle'.

Mrs Doyle is a hyperactive, repressed and somewhat insane parish housekeeper with an over-the-top zeal for her work. Obsessed with refreshments, she is often to be found preparing copious amounts of tea, cake and sandwiches; she disdained an automated tea-making machine, stating that she "liked the misery" of making tea, and was devastated when Ted bought her one for Christmas. She eventually destroyed it and convinced Ted that she was the right person for making tea. She even stays up all night "just in case one of you needs a cup of tea!" Whenever Ted or somebody else refuses one of her beverages, sandwiches or cake, she urges them on for some time, usually just by repeating "go on, go on", until the offending priest or guest finally agrees just for the sake of some peace. Sometimes, she then denies them the offered item(s). In the episode Hell, when Ted finally gives in, she concludes that she is forcing him to have a cake, and tells him that he should "just say no" (which he had done repeatedly), calling it a "word that Our Lord gave us to use when we didn't want any cake". She then proceeds to have the cakes destroyed.

Aside from simple domestic chores, Mrs Doyle also performs all the other tasks that need completing around the house, such as digging drainage ditches and mending the roof. In this respect, Ted takes advantage of her work ethic and treats her like a general dogsbody. She frequently suffers accidents while attending to these chores, such as falling off the roof, falling down the stairs and especially plummeting head-first out of the large window frame in the front room.

Little or nothing is known about her personal life except that she must have been married at some point and previously spoke of having a sister. She has a dim view of sex, once mentioning how thankful she is that "she never thinks about that sort of thing", and in this respect appears quite conservative, but in the episode “Speed 3” she becomes quite enamoured with the virile milkman Pat Mustard, to the extent she orders so much milk nothing else can fit in her refrigerator. In "And God Created Woman", when she and Ted are discussing the work of novelist Polly Clarke, she laments how much swearing there is in modern fiction and goes on a rant about the amount of sex in Clarke's books. She also becomes spiteful, condescending and visibly jealous whenever another woman comes into the parochial house, especially those who are good-looking or command the attention of the priests. She has women friends on the island who appear sporadically throughout the series, and who all look and dress in a fairly similar fashion to herself and speak in much the same manner.

In the episode "The Mainland", she is arrested for getting into a fight in a tearoom.

Graham Linehan has stated that he always thought Mrs Doyle originally met Father Ted by winning the Lovely Girls competition.

== Supporting characters ==
=== Bishop Brennan ===
Bishop Leonard "Len" Brennan (played by Jim Norton) appears in three episodes: "The Passion of St Tibulus", "The Plague" and "Kicking Bishop Brennan Up the Arse".

A recurring antagonist in the series, Bishop Brennan is a stern, overbearing, foul-mouthed, lecherous, hypocritical narcissist who despises Ted and frequently casts a shadow over his lowly priest's life. Throughout the series he consistently addresses Ted using his surname: "Crilly", and this reference is one of several traits that symbolises his displeasure at the Fathers' incompetence. He also despises Dougal, whom he refers to as a "cabbage" and "Forrest Gump". He does not take kindly to Dougal calling him "Len", and sometimes shouts profanity at him when he does so.

Brennan has also forsaken his vows of celibacy; in "The Passion of Saint Tibulus", it is revealed that he has a secret partner and love child in America. Also, in "The Plague", when Brennan hangs up the phone on Ted, a naked woman joins him in the bath straight after.

He visits the island on three occasions:

1. When the "blasphemous film" The Passion of Saint Tibulus (after which the episode featuring his first appearance is named) is being shown on the island thanks to a loophole despite a ban on its appearance elsewhere. Ted and Dougal's half-hearted protest in standing against the showing ("Down with this sort of thing!") only attracts more attention to the film, with people flocking to the island to see it (some coming from as far away as Gdańsk). Bishop Brennan vows to punish the three priests by exiling them elsewhere in the world, to places even worse than Craggy Island. However, the Bishop changes his mind off-screen when Jack finds a video tape in his overnight bag containing footage of him with the boy and woman who are presumed to be his long-rumoured son and girlfriend (the boy's mother) on holiday in California. It is implied that Ted used this footage to blackmail him.
2. When Father Jack starts a habit of nude sleepwalking, which to Bishop Brennan's fury had been witnessed by an old and respected friend of his. During this visit, Ted goes to great lengths to conceal from the bishop the presence of a horde of rabbits in the parochial house, as Bishop Brennan has a fear of rabbits due to a traumatic experience with the animals in a lift in New York, where they "burrowed" into the lift and nibbled on his cape. Despite Ted's best efforts, the rabbits end up in Brennan's room while he is asleep due to Father Jack sleepwalking into his room and getting into bed with him. Upon waking up, Ted and Dougal try to convince Bishop Brennan that he is simply having a bad dream, which he initially believes before screaming once he realises the truth.
3. When Ted has to pay a forfeit to Father Dick Byrne after cheating at a football match, Father Byrne orders Ted to kick the bishop "up the arse". To give Ted an opportunity to carry out the forfeit, Byrne calls the bishop and tells him that his likeness has appeared in the skirting boards of the Craggy Island parochial house; ultimately, all the bishop sees is a crude watercolour painting (courtesy of Dougal) of a man in a bishop's hat. Whilst the bishop is bent over, Ted kicks him up the arse as hard as possible. As the kick takes place, Dougal takes a picture, which is subsequently reproduced in various sizes. When the bishop sees, via a 10-foot (3 m) print propped against the front of the house, the picture of the kick, he asks Ted to position himself so that the bishop may stand behind him, and after turning around and seeing the picture, Ted realises why Brennan has made the request. Ted flees across a field, but the bishop catches up to Ted and kicks him up the arse in revenge, sending Ted flying.

In a DVD audio commentary, Graham Linehan said that he considers Bishop Brennan to be the archenemy of Father Jack Hackett, because Jack had the potential to become a bishop, but failed, whereas Brennan succeeded. Jack, whom Brennan refers to as "The Kraken", is considerably less afraid of Brennan than Ted or Dougal are, and openly regards him with contempt, often telling him to "feck off", punching him in the face after the bishop wakes Jack up, and sarcastically apologising for saying "Arse biscuits!" in front of the bishop.

Bishop Brennan is consistently addressed by other characters (with the exception of Dougal) as "Your Grace", which is an unofficial salutation.

=== Father Dick Byrne ===
Father Dick Byrne is played by Maurice O'Donoghue. He appears in four episodes of the show, in "Competition Time"; "Song For Europe"; "Cigarettes and Alcohol and Rollerblading"; and "Escape from Victory". Dick is Ted's equivalent on nearby Rugged Island, and his bitter rival.

Dick is Ted's nemesis, and often manages to outwit him as part of their ongoing feud. It is unknown how the feud started, but Dougal once mentions a "Scrabble fiasco" (in which Father Byrne manages to get all of his words to spell "useless priest, can't say Mass"). The feud has led to various ill-judged escapades, usually after Dick has telephoned Ted to tease him for some inadequacy or taunt him for some fault. These include fooling him on the phone into thinking that Dick had sincerely believed Ted's Eurovision song would be good, and winning the annual "All-Priests Five-a-Side Over-75s Indoor Football Challenge Match". However, there are also instances where Ted gets the better of Dick. Ted mentions an occasion where Dick had lost a bet with him and that as a forfeit, he had had to say "bollocks" very loudly in front of the (then) Irish President Mary Robinson. Ted also beats Dick in the Eurosong competition, despite Dick's song, "The Miracle Is Mine", being given a standing ovation and being far superior to the Craggy Island effort (although this was part of a plan to ensure that Ireland would lose Eurosong and thus not have to host it at great expense the following year). Ted states that he "really hates Father Dick Byrne!"

In the 2010 Channel 4 retrospective Small, Far Away – The World of Father Ted, Graham Linehan and Arthur Mathews state that Maurice O'Donoghue and the rest of the Rugged Island cast were each their second choices to play the main characters on the show.

=== Father Larry Duff ===
Father Larry Duff, played by Tony Guilfoyle, is a friend of Ted's who always seems to be on the receiving end of some misfortune. The cause of these events is usually Ted calling him on his mobile phone. Examples of Larry's mishaps include driving off a cliff in his Ford Cortina while looking for his ringing mobile ("Hell"), losing £10,000 in a TV gameshow when Ted interrupts his concentration by ringing him ("Cigarettes and Alcohol and Rollerblading"), getting hit while volunteering for a blind-folded knife throwing act ("Tentacles of Doom"), and being trampled by a herd of stampeding donkeys ("Flight Into Terror"). Occasionally Ted manages to get through to him, only to be informed he will not be arriving at a picnic as he is being investigated for weapons smuggling by the Army ("Old Grey Whistle Theft") or that he cannot accept Ted's offer of rabbits as he decided to get 12 rottweilers instead ("The Plague"). Ted often mentions Larry as being "tremendous fun". He appears to be a good friend of Bishop Facks, who appears in "Tentacles of Doom". Despite his frequent injuries, he always returns unscathed in his next appearance. Though they are close friends, Ted and Larry are never seen together on screen in the entire three series. After his last appearance in A Christmassy Ted, Fr Duff's fate is unknown.

The character has been referenced in Spider-Man 2099, with a statue of Larry replacing that of Francis P. Duffy in a scene depicting Duffy Square.

=== Father Noel Furlong ===
Father Noel Furlong is played by Graham Norton. He appears in three episodes of the show, in "Hell" and "Flight Into Terror" in series 2; and in "The Mainland" in series 3.

Father Noel is a very annoying and hyperactive priest with whom Ted and Dougal hate spending time. He runs the St. Luke's Youth Group and is first encountered during Ted's abortive caravanning holiday in "Hell". Here he invades the peaceful surroundings of the priests' rented caravan and keeps them awake at night, singing songs ("The Whole of the Moon" and "Dirty Old Town") and expressing his desire to tell ghost stories at six o'clock in the morning. He regales the helpless Ted and Dougal with tales of how members of the youth group have a habit of turning in "late" ("ten past the eleven") and succeeds in driving them out of their holiday home, which he then proceeds to tip over after having himself and the youth group perform a Riverdance routine inside it.

Father Noel turns up again in "Flight into Terror" in which he is accompanying Father Fintan Fay, the monkey priest of Killybashangel.

Noel makes a third appearance in Season 3's "The Mainland", in which his boundless energy results in him getting his group lost in the "Very Dark Caves" and, after performing a rendition of "Bohemian Rhapsody", his attempts to start a "screeching competition" cause him to be buried under falling rocks, dislodged by the noise he is making. His very last scene features him under the rocks with his hand sticking out, still in a very happy mood. His youth group then abandon him and head to Paraguay on Aer Lingus flights. Ted tells an apparent rescue service man to save Noel, but the man turns out actually to be an uninterested dustman. In the short scene after the credits, Noel is still under the rocks, clicking his fingers and singing "Fat Bottomed Girls".

== Minor characters ==
=== Father Paul Stone ===
Father Paul Stone, played by Michael Redmond, is an exceedingly boring priest who featured in the episode "Entertaining Father Stone" and comes to stay at the parochial house every year. He is completely unable to hold a conversation and is more than happy just to sit and do/say nothing at all, giving one-sentence answers at best. He usually brushes off any attempted social interaction by saying something along the lines of "No. I'm fine". Despite his quiet persona, Father Stone's presence dominates those around him, leading to awkward and protracted silences, which suck the life out of the room, ruining Ted's birthday party as a result. His unresponsiveness makes him practically impossible to get rid of, causing Ted and the others to go to great lengths just to avoid contact with him, such as going to bed extremely early or going out to the island's sub-standard crazy golf course in the pouring rain. When Ted prays to God with the intention of getting rid of Father Stone, he is subsequently struck by lightning after joining Ted and Dougal at the crazy golf course. He gets stuck in the same position as he was when he is struck, and surgeons are unable to remove the golf club from his hands, leading Dougal to comment: "He looks like a trophy". His grandmother and parents are alive and he is known to have one brother who is a doctor. It turns out that he hero-worships Ted and once drew a portrait of the two of them together, which features in subsequent episodes appearing on the living room mantle.

=== Father Austin Purcell ===
Father Austin Purcell, played by Ben Keaton, features in the episode "Think Fast, Father Ted". He is "the most boring priest in the world", according to Ted. The entire population of a village in Nigeria once sailed to their deaths on a crocodile-infested lake to escape him. He talks constantly in an annoying high-pitched voice about the most trivial and irritating topics, including central heating, insurance and "favourite humming noises". His conversation includes describing painting a house orange and building extensions on an extension, concluding "the house is in a circle now". Ted has to physically restrain Father Jack from punching Father Austin. After Ted allows Father Jack to leave he cries out 'Thank Christ' and promptly locks Ted up with Father Austin in his place. He claims to have known a woman once, "but she died soon afterwards". Purcell keeps talking even when no one is listening, at one point striking up a conversation with a sofa coverlet embroidered with Jesus' face: "Ah, it's yourself!".

In 2014, Keaton returned to the role, performing a stand-up routine and hosting pub quizzes entirely in character. Keaton also set up a Twitter page for the character, and a website where fans can purchase customised Father Purcell video greetings. In 2015, Keaton began a spin-off web series, Cook Like a Priest.

=== Father Fintan Stack ===
Father Fintan Stack, played by Brendan Grace, is the main antagonist in the episode "New Jack City". He comes to the Parochial House as Father Jack's replacement when Jack contracts "hairy hands syndrome" and is sent to St Clabbert's (known informally among the priests as "Jurassic Park"). Father Stack is rude, obnoxious and destructive. His unpleasant habits, in which he engages solely for his own amusement, include:

- Being casually rude
- Intimidating anyone within the house
- Baselessly accusing his fellow priests of lechery
- Threatening to put people's heads through walls
- Eating Ted's Frosties
- Getting Dougal drunk on Jack's whiskey
- Jumping up and down on a photo of Ted
- Drilling into the wall with a hole saw during the night
- Driving Ted's car into a wall (off-camera). Following this, Father Stack informs Ted, "I took your car and drove it into a big wall. If you don't like it, tough. I had my fun and that's all that matters." (whilst cleaning his ear with Ted's car keys)
- Playing loud jungle music throughout the small hours (the tracks used on the show were Cutty Ranks' "Limb By Limb (DJ SS Remix)" and DJ Taktix's "The Way") while randomly drilling holes in the living-room wall.

Stack's visit is abruptly cut short when he too contracts Hairy Hands Syndrome from sitting in Jack's chair. This is discovered right as Jack is about to punch Stack out for going after his whiskey.

Ted concludes that Stack is worse than Hitler, because "you wouldn't find Hitler playing jungle music at three in the morning".

=== Father "Todd Unctious" ===
Father "Todd Unctious", played by Gerard McSorley, appears in the episode "A Christmassy Ted". He turns up at the parochial house at Christmas claiming to be an old pal of Ted's; Ted has no recollection of Todd whatsoever. Ted is required to employ long-winded strategies to find out his name, without success. An attempt to get him to write his name fails, with Unctious claiming he once fell while running with scissors, completely severing the nerve that controls handwriting. Fortunately Mrs Doyle manages to guess his name in under an hour, after increasingly ridiculous wrong guesses (including Neil Hannon, a reference to the Divine Comedy singer who wrote the show's theme tune). His behaviour disturbs Ted: he enjoys wandering around in nothing but his underpants, is not averse to showing Ted some of his more intimate scars, and likes shadow boxing. He turns out to be a thief who wants to steal Ted's "Golden Cleric" Award, having befriended another mysterious priest in a bar who knew Ted. He then proceeded to steal the other priest's clothes, despite having priest's clothes of his own, claiming "it was just going that way". It is also revealed at the end of the episode that Todd Unctious is not his real name.

=== Other priests ===
- Father Jose Fernandez (Derrick Branche), an old friend of Ted and Dougal. He is a priest from Cuba and he drives a red convertible Porsche 911 Turbo. He visits them, leaving Dougal a VCR and Ted a Cuban fertility symbol. He speaks only in Spanish, which a narrator translates, including the laughter. According to the episode DVD commentary, it is not certain whether Ted and Dougal understand Spanish or actually hear the disembodied voice. The role was played by Derrick Branche, who was Gupte in Only When I Laugh, which also starred Richard Wilson, who appears as himself in another episode. ("The Mainland").
- Father Cyril MacDuff (Don Wycherley), Dougal's equivalent on Rugged Island. Dougal thinks he is "an awful eejit." He often gets confused about events, for instance, thinking that Dick's five-a-side football team has won the match ("Escape from Victory").
- Father Jim Johnson (Chris Curran), Jack's equivalent on Rugged Island. Although Jim looks relatively normal compared to Jack, his personality and alcoholic habits are much the same.
- Father Barty Dunne (Fergus O'Kelly), the Laughing Priest. Barty earns universal hatred and annoyance by his habit of chuckling hysterically through everything he says. ("Competition Time").
- Father Harry Coyle (Paul Woodfull), who appears as a Ziggy Stardust lookalike in "Competition Time".
- Father Paul Cleary (Tommy Duggan), an extremely aged priest who attends Jack's wake in "Grant Unto Him Eternal Rest" and refuses Mrs Doyle's "diagonal" sandwiches.
- Father Fintan Fay (Jimmy Keogh), an old, mad priest (the Monkey Priest of Killybashangel, itself a reference to a popular BBC drama about an English priest in Ireland, Ballykissangel) who communicates in a noisy gibberish (resembling the gibbering of a monkey, hence his nickname) that, somehow, everyone can understand. He is not supposed to see his own reflection because he does not know he is a priest. He is well liked by other priests and his reason for getting a parachute on the crashing plane was applauded, despite being completely incoherent. ("Grant Unto Him Eternal Rest", "Flight into Terror").
- Father Jim Sutton and Father Mackie, who also attend the premature wake.
- Father Liam Finnegan (James Benson), the famous "Dancing Priest" who spends most of his time dancing and became famous after "dancing for peace" across America. Following a visit from Ted, he drops dead from a heart attack induced by too much dancing ("Think Fast, Father Ted"). The song he is seen dancing to is called "Beatnik Fly" by Johnny and the Hurricanes.
- Father Billy O'Dwyer (Gerry O'Brien), a.k.a. The SpinMaster. He DJs at a disco on Craggy Island but having forgot to bring his records he is forced to play Ghost Town by The Specials continually throughout the evening. He is also a gambling addict who ruins the raffle in "Think Fast, Father Ted" by stealing the proceeds to pay off his underworld debts.
- Father Tiernan, Father Rafter, Father Cafferty and Father Leonard, friends of Ted's who step in to fill an awkward hiatus during a charity event by performing as a strange Kraftwerk-style electro group. ("Think Fast, Father Ted")
- Father Damien "Damo" Lennon (Joe Rooney), a cocky young priest who befriends Dougal and impresses him with his rebellious attitude, becoming Dougal's role model. Particularly untypical for a priest, he sports an earring, loves Oasis, smokes cigarettes, plays video games and has a love for petty theft. He features in season 2's "The Old Grey Whistle Theft" in which he and his keeper, Father Frost, come to Craggy Island for a visit, and Damo causes a sensation on the island when he steals a whistle, sending Craggy Island into a panic over this perceived breakdown of law and order.
- Father "Frosty" Frost (Rio Fanning), Father Damo's registered keeper, a middle-aged priest who behaves towards Damo like a strict parent. Disliked by Damo for his strict rules, Damo nicknames him 'Frosty' and takes pleasure in disobeying his orders ("The Old Grey Whistle Theft").
- Father Liam Deliverance (Dermot Crowley), an only partially insane priest who wreaks destruction upon the Parochial House (attempting to demonstrate the "shoddy" workmanship of the house) before assisting Ted at the "Lovely Girls" competition. ("Rock-a-Hula Ted").
- Father Walton (Larry O'Brien), an inmate of "Jurassic Park" who reached Stage 12 of the "hair thing", and was mistakenly kidnapped by Ted and Dougal in an attempt to recover Jack from the home. He has a similar demeanour to Jack, as is evident when he tells Ted and Dougal to feck off. ("New Jack City").
- Father O'Shea (Paul Hickey), a passenger in "Flight into Terror" who confessed to impregnating his housekeeper and forcing her to leave the country, thus slightly dashing his chances of winning a parachute. His chances were further dashed when he did not stop typing his "why-I-should-get-a-parachute" speech when the time was up.
- Father Joe Briefly (Patrick Duggan), an old friend of Ted's from the seminary, where he used to be known as "Himalaya Joe" because of the thick black hair growing between his toes, although this was due to a medical condition. Joe lets Dougal know Ted had a nickname, leading everyone to find out that Ted's nickname was "Father Fluffy Bottom" because "he had a big pile of fluffy white hair on his behind". ("Flight into Terror").
- Father Flynn (Jonathan White), a not totally with-it priest. When asked to write 200 words on "why I should be given a parachute" in "Flight into Terror", he stood up and produced only a drawing of himself "in the nip, with a dog", claiming to have misunderstood what was going on before taking his seat again.
- Father Gallagher (Graham Linehan) and Father Cave (Kevin Gildea), a pair of young priests. It appears that Father Cave's idea of their relationship is slightly different from Father Gallagher's, to the embarrassment of both parties. Graham Linehan appears as Father Gallagher, who after hearing that the plane is in danger of crashing, suggests they pray to God for help. This idea is met with disdain from his fellow priests ("Flight into Terror").
- Father Seamus Fitzpatrick (Patrick Kavanagh), to whom Ted once lent his copy of Stephen King's The Shining, collector of (German) war memorabilia and not-so-closet Nazi. His ex-Wehrmacht housemate unfortunately confuses Valium with cyanide, spelling swift death all round. ("Are You Right There, Father Ted?").
- Father Kevin (Tommy Tiernan), a young priest whose suicide attempt is foiled by Ted at "It's Great Being a Priest '98". He is later cured of depression by the "Theme from Shaft", but subsequently plunges back into the depths of it after overhearing a Radiohead song ("Exit Music (For a Film)") on a bus. ("Going to America").
- Father Buzz Cagney (Jeff Harding), an American priest who appears in the last episode. After seeing Ted help Father Kevin from killing himself at the "It's Great to be a Priest '98" celebration, he offers Ted a chance to work with him in a parish in America, which Ted decides to turn down upon hearing about gun violence in the country. ("Going to America").
- Father Brian Eno, an attendee at "It's Great Being a Priest '98", portrayed by Brian Eno himself.
- Father Derek Beeching (Eamon Morrissey) who mucks in to help with the milk-float crisis in "Speed 3". He is particularly fond of saying mass. Father Beeching and Father Clarke live at Barren Island Parochial House.
- Father Clarke (Arthur Mathews), who encourages Father Beeching to say mass during the milk-float crisis in "Speed 3".
- Father Jessup (Ian Fitzgibbon), personal assistant to Bishop Brennan, and known as "the most sarcastic priest in Ireland". Father Jack locks him in his dirty underwear basket since Father Jessup had earlier ordered Jack to apologise for saying "arse biscuits" in front of the bishop. Since Mrs Doyle is told to do the opposite of everything he says (due to her not understanding his sarcasm), he is left locked in the basket despite pleading for help. ("Kicking Bishop Brennan Up the Arse")
- Father Nick, star striker alongside Father Jack in the "Annual, All-Priests, Five-a-Side, Over-75s Indoor Challenge Football Match", who dies before the big match in "Escape from Victory". He is seen lying in a hi-tech coffin that can receive faxes.
- Father Niall Haverty (Stephen Brennan) who provides Ted with the false arms and electric wheelchair for Fr Jack in "Escape from Victory".
- Father Romeo Sensini, (Conor Evans) Italian priest and football champion in the "Annual, All-Priests, Five-a-Side, Over-75's Indoor Challenge Football Match" in "Escape from Victory". He can climb two flights of stairs unassisted and he needs only one nun to help him get out of a chair.
- Father Ned Fitzmaurice, (Peter Dix) an elderly priest who adds to the injury crisis in the build-up to the "Annual, All-Priests, Five-a-Side, Over-75s Indoor Challenge Football Match". He trips on a pavestone and one of his kneecaps falls off, forcing Ted to play him in goal. ("Escape from Victory").
- Father Deegan (Kevin McKidd), a young and despairing Glaswegian priest, fresh from the seminary, who is part of the group that gets lost in the lingerie department. ("A Christmassy Ted").
- Father Billy (Donncha Crowley), another of the priests who gets lost in the lingerie department. He is not particularly out-of-the-ordinary although he seems to believe that a priest buying women's underwear would not look so strange. ("A Christmassy Ted").
- Father Terry (Neil McCaul), the lost priest who kept pointing out that it was "Ireland's biggest lingerie section". ("A Christmassy Ted").
- Father Cleary (Joe Taylor), the lost priest who managed to injure himself with the elastic strap of a bra after messing about with it. ("A Christmassy Ted").
- Father Fitzgerald (Sean Barrett), a dreary character infamous for having an incredibly boring voice which is almost too dull to listen to. The trapped priests use his voice as a means of escaping from the lingerie department unnoticed. ("A Christmassy Ted").
- Father Reilly (Colum Gallivan), the exact opposite of Father Fitzgerald in that he has a rather more exciting voice and acts in a dramatic thespian-like manner. ("A Christmassy Ted").
- Father Williams, a priest secretly working for the Provisional Irish Republican Army who was driving Father Larry Duff to the picnic. Father Williams and Larry Duff were stopped by armed soldiers, due to the discovery of "a big box of machine guns in his house". Fr Williams ran through the roadblock and was shot by the soldiers off-screen. ("Old Grey Whistle Theft").
- Father Shaft (Donegal priest) (Kevin Sharkey), a black priest who Sister Monica mistakes as being from Africa. When asked if he thinks the African church is doing a good job, he awkwardly replies that he is in fact from Donegal. ("Grant Unto Him Eternal Rest")
- The inmates of St. Clabbert's, mad, old priests who have been transferred to St. Clabbert's Old Priests Home. They start shouting whenever a light is switched on in their presence, and, much like Jack, seem capable of only shouting "DRINK!", "FECK!", "ARSE!" and "GIRLS!". ("New Jack City")
- The posh priest (Desmond Jordan), an inmate of St. Clabbert's, who says "I really shouldn't be here." ("New Jack City")

=== Unseen priests ===
- Father O'Rourke, owner of the new caravan rented by Ted, Dougal and Jack which is "twice as big as the old one". ("Hell").
- Father Jimmy Ranable, a friend of Ted's whose time under the tutoring of Jack had the greatest effect on him. Then took part in the "Drumshanbo Massacre". ("Grant Unto Him Eternal Rest").
- Father Benny Cake, a priest who according to Ted recorded a song that went to number one in England. He did not want people to know he was a priest so he changed his name, Ted could not remember what he called himself but mentioned "...Anyway, I think the song was called Vienna", implying he was actually Midge Ure from Ultravox (even though, in fact, that song only made it to number two in the UK chart) ("Song For Europe").
- Father Clippett, "they say he does a good long Mass", now takes three hours to say mass, due to having had a stroke. "Value for money", according to Sister Assumpta. ("And God Created Woman").
- Father Shortall, whom Ted and Dougal both ask Father Stone if he has seen lately. Dougal reckons he must be nearly 80 now. ("Entertaining Father Stone").
- Father Jim Dougan, responsible for introducing Ted to Father Stone before he "ran out of the building".
- Father Sweeney, friend of Father Noel Furlong who is ridiculed because he had "a very small bladder, about the size of a Terry's Chocolate Orange." ("Hell").
- Father Fitzgibbon, another priest known to Father Noel Furlong, had a cup named after him and in a bizarre coincidence his big ears made him resemble a cup - in reference to the Fitzgibbon Cup. ("Hell").
- Father Hegarty, from Chicago, does not actually appear but sends a fax through the hi-tech coffin of Father Nick in "Escape from Victory".
- Father Nolan had the misfortune of being involved in a gas explosion which punched a hole in his chest the size of a football. He was so badly injured that he could only be identified by his dental records and understandably feels rather down about it. Ted briefly mentions him in "Night of the Nearly Dead".
- Father Bigley, an unseen character within the series with peculiar attributes. He was mistakenly considered dead; it emerged that he just looked dead. He has facial blotches and "big puffy fish lips bigger than the rest of his face", possibly due to an altercation with an exploding kettle. ("Hell"). He is an avid Dana fan and is now in a home following some suspicious fires. He also wears perfume, and performed at OJ Simpson's wedding. Ted mentioned that he had a friend "who was sending arms to Iraq".
- Father Clint Power, a priest and an old acquaintance of Ted. Ted was confused when he saw the feminist headline 'Clit Power' in a magazine, as he thought that the article was referring to Clint Power.
- Father Eamon Hunter, a priest mentioned by Ted in his Golden Cleric speech who put him in a headlock and is now abroad working with some pygmies in the South Seas. ("A Christmassy Ted").
- Father Windy Shepherd Henderson, a priest mentioned by Ted who is believed to have been the parish priest to Father Shorthall and Father Coogan in Wicklow. He is often mixed up with other priests of the same name such as Father Windy Shepherd Henderson who was in Tralee with Father Buckley or Father Windy Shepherd Henderson who was working in Chicago. ("New Jack City")
- Father Burke, mentioned as being the first person on the scene when Malcolm X was assassinated. ("New Jack City")

=== Bishops ===
- Bishop Lindsay, who Dougal thought was accusing Ted when he asked where Ted was when Kennedy was shot. Never appears in the series. ("Tentacles of Doom")
- Known collectively as "The Bishops", these three appear in "Tentacles of Doom":
  - Bishop Jordan (Paddy Ward), an elderly bishop with a weak heart who leaves the Craggy Island parochial house in a coffin after an unsavoury incident with sewage.
  - Bishop Eddie O'Neill (Kevin Moore), a bishop who, upon hearing Dougal's philosophy on God and existence, renounces religion and is last seen leaving for India in a van with some pot-smoking hippie friends.
  - Bishop Facks (Denys Hawthorne), a maniacally intense bishop with a weird habit of poking people, who latches onto Jack and leaves in an ambulance with the Holy Stone of Clonrichert up his behind.
- Bishop Tom McCaskell (Andrew McCulloch), the Bishop who telephones Ted with the news that he has won a Golden Cleric award. He is hiding in Rome following an unspecified scandal involving a woman who is planning to "write a bloody book about it", and is contemplating a move to South America. ("A Christmassy Ted")

=== Nuns ===
- Sister Assumpta, a crazed, sadistic nun belonging to the Matty Hislop cult, who tortures Ted and Dougal with early wake-up calls, morning punishments, beatings and cold baths in "Cigarettes and Alcohol and Rollerblading" in order to keep them succumbing to the luxuries they gave up for Lent. Jack managed to escape her torture, as he hurled himself through the window and fled into the countryside immediately after seeing her. Fortunately for Ted, she has one fatal weakness – chocolate – and this proves to be her undoing. She later goes to Rugged Island, where she inflicts even worse punishments on Father Dick Byrne and his fellow priests for pretending to give up their luxuries for Lent. Ted encountered her before, as the leader of a group of nuns in "And God Created Woman", though this encounter is not referenced when she comes to temporarily live with Ted.
- Sister Imelda, a.k.a. 'the Blue Nun'. Appears to disappear with Jack during a wedding. Never appears in the series.
- Polly Clarke, best-selling female novelist who became a nun after her experiences in "And God Created Woman".
- Sister Julia, a nun who is reputedly 97 years old. ("And God Created Woman")
- Sister Margaret, a nun who asks Ted where he gets the ideas for his sermons. ("And God Created Woman")
- Sister Danita, with whom Dougal had an encounter that was "a bit too close for comfort". Mentioned in "And God Created Woman" but never appears in the series.
- Sister Monica Mulligan, a Northern Irish nun who comes to stay with the boys. She is mistakenly accused of "touching" Ted and diagnoses Jack's death, but is unceremoniously shunted off when the details of his legacy are revealed. ("Grant unto Him Eternal Rest"). She also has a minor role as a nun at St Clabberts. ("New Jack City")
- Two nuns on plane, they persistently throw paper balls at Ted in "Flight into Terror" causing him to react with rage, but a blind priest behind him laughs simultaneously (At a comedy tape he is listening to), making Ted believe that it is him throwing the paper. Pauline McLynn plays the smaller nun.
- Sister Mary Gondola, a call centre agent working for the Matty Hislop customer services division.
- Singing Nun, a nun working for the Matty Hislop organisation, who joyously sings Ave Maria down the phone to Ted whenever his call is put on hold.
- Sister Concepta, one of Sister Assumpta's group in 'And God Created Woman'. She gave Father Ted's mass 10/10 and Sister Assumpta dubs her as very hard to please.

=== Inhabitants of Craggy Island ===
- John and Mary O'Leary, (Patrick Drury and Rynagh O'Grady, respectively) a married couple who own and operate a shop on Craggy Island. The pair utterly hate each other and are constantly devising ways to maim and kill one another, such as Mary threatening to stick a knife "up [John's] arse!" Despite this, they act like a happily married couple in front of priests. Whenever the characters encounter John and Mary, the pair are insulting each other or in the middle or aftermath of yet another attempt to kill each other. In a DVD commentary the writers said although they liked the characters they felt they were limited to one joke and were gradually used less as the series progressed. In the final series they only made one appearance.
- Tom (Pat Shortt), a violent village idiot, vivisectionist, armed robber and lorry driver. Tom is often to be seen wearing his "I shot J.R." T-shirt, looking at outsiders as they arrive on Craggy Island. Ted often displays a complete lack of interest in crimes or sins Tom may have committed. On one occasion, when Tom says he has killed a man, Ted tells him that he is too busy to speak to him about it. Another time he sees Tom rob a post office while Ted is waiting in a car outside for him. Upon telling Tom that he hopes he is not up to his old tricks, Tom replies "'Tis my money, Father. I just didn't want to fill in the forms". Tom has a scar, and when asked about it he declares 'I was in an argument'. He then pulls down his trousers, and grinning from between his legs, declares "would you believe me own dog did that to me. Doesn't it look like a face?". He appears in "Good Luck, Father Ted" (as the first person Terry McNamee sees upon his arrival on Craggy Island), "And God Created Woman", "Hell" and "The Plague" (as the person Ted and Dougal call on to "take care of" the rabbits).
- The Sergeant, the island's garda. He does not enjoy his job and laments that Craggy Island is boring, to the point where he actually wishes that there was a murderer on the loose. Often brought in to tranquilise individuals who have relapsed or had a mental breakdown such as celebrities. His predecessor was Sergeant Thornton, who for some reason left his handcuffs (but not his keys) at O'Leary's. The sergeant appears in "Competition Time", "The Old Grey Whistle Theft" and in "A Christmassy Ted". His name is uncertain; in "Competition Time" he is Sergeant Deegan (played by John Olohan), in "The Old Grey Whistle Theft" he is Sergeant Hodgins (also played by John Olohan) while in "A Christmassy Ted" John Quinn plays a "Police Sergeant" (even though the word "police" is not used by the Garda Síochána). It is not clear whether these are meant to be separate characters.
- Michael Cocheese (Jon Kenny), the cinema manager, an old friend of Ted and Dougal's, who lets them in for half price. He notes that Father Jack always turns up when they show raunchy or other racy films, and cannot stand Bishop Brennan, regarding him as a "gobshite".
- Fargo Boyle, owner of Chris the sheep in the episode "Chirpy Burpy Cheap Sheep".
- Giant Reed and Hud Hastings, two men paid by Fargo Boyle to frighten Chris the Sheep, and who use their bribe money to buy a fur coat and a crown respectively.
- Pat, an elderly gentleman who, despite the very recent death of his wife (merely hours ago), insists on going to the cinema to see the controversial movie "The Passion of St Tibulus". He also appears in the Father Ted episode "Going to America" (as "Eugene"), criticising Father Ted's Sunday Mass sermon.
- Mr Benson (Mal Whyte), curator of the island's picnic spot. He appears to believe himself to be living in a spaghetti western movie. His beloved whistle was stolen from him in "The Old Grey Whistle Theft", but he got it back. In the process, however, he lost all feeling in one leg, but since his memory was also affected could not remember which leg it was. Previously, he had an affair with his wife's sister while his wife was in hospital, then got the babysitter pregnant.
- Sean Yin (played by Ozzie Yue) and his family, who live in Craggy Island's Chinatown. Ted does an extremely silly Chinaman impression, only realising at the last minute that the Yin family were watching him through the parochial house window. This causes rumours to spread that Ted is a racist, and he must demonstrate to Sean and his family that he is not a racist.
- Colm (Eamon Rohan), an old farmer, who appears in the episode "Are You Right There, Father Ted?" Having heard the rumours that Father Ted is a racist, he explains to Ted that the farm keeps him too busy to devote much time to "the old racism".
- Auld Jim Halpin, an eyewitness to the heinous whistle theft in "The Old Grey Whistle Theft". In a separate incident, Ted tells Dougal and a group of nuns that Jim is dying, in an attempt to avoid saying mass. ("And God Created Woman") Jim, however, is not dying; Dougal remembers he is outside (having come to borrow some sugar) and brings him in. He did have a cold a couple of weeks earlier though. He also went to watch The Passion of St Tibulus, despite Ted and Dougal's attempt to persuade the islanders otherwise.
- Mrs Carberry, an elderly lady with extreme right-wing views who appears in the episode "Are You Right There, Father Ted?". She is supportive of Father Ted when rumours circulate that he is a racist. She has an extreme dislike of foreigners, especially the Greeks, because "they invented gayness". She is believed to be based on then anti-immgration campaigner, Áine Ní Chonaill, who lived in the Cork town of Roscarbery, and was similar in views and appearance.
- The Sewage Supervisor, unnamed, he misguidedly entrusts Tom with a gigantic sewage lorry in "Hell".
- Dr Sinnott, the island's doctor, who plays a large part in the life (and death) of the community. He must put on a radiation suit to examine Father Jack.
- Imelda (Dawn Bradfield), winner of the Lovely Girls competition. She is 19 and from Dundalk. Ted reads a series of incorrect information about her.
- Mary, runner-up in the Lovely Girls competition. She loses to Imelda in the Lovely Laugh Tiebreaker. Ted comments on her having a lovely bottom, but to be politically correct, he says "Of course, they all have lovely bottoms".
- Joan, contestant in the Lovely Girls competition. She fails to make it to the finals because, Ted tells her, "Your sandwiches exceed the required six centimeters in width."
- The Lads, attending the Lovely Girls competition. Paddy, Billy and the two other unnamed lads are there to check out the lovely girls and have pints of Guinness.
- Pat Mustard (Pat Laffan), a sex-addicted milkman and the main antagonist of the episode "Speed 3". He leaves a trail of exceedingly hairy illegitimate children all around the island. Mrs Doyle is one of the women who becomes infatuated with him. When Ted's surveillance photos cost Pat his job, he rigs Dougal's milk float with a bomb. After Ted executes a plan to rescue Dougal, Pat's plan backfires, as he is ultimately killed in the explosion.
- Mr Fox (John Rogan), the head of the Craggy Island Creamery. When shown incriminating photos relating to Pat Mustard's amorous activities with the housewives of Craggy Island, he at first offers to buy the pictures, but upon learning that Ted intended to draw attention to Pat's conduct, he immediately fires Pat. Left without a milkman, he accepts Dougal's offer to fill in for a while. ("Speed 3")
- Mrs Sheridan and Mrs Glynn, two old pepperpots with an unusual taste in film; they are known to favour The Crying Game and Boyz n the Hood.
- Māori man, a man who attends the Craggy Island Celebration of Cultures. He appears in a reaction shot when Ted remarks that there are no Māori on the island, after mistakenly putting up a slide of a Māori person.
- Alan (Eamon Rohan), the rambling host of the King of the Sheep awards.
- Mrs Boyle, who blabbed the news of Eoin McLove's visit to every middle-aged fan of his on Craggy Island, despite vowing that if she spread the word she'd be "struck down with every disease that it is known for a middle-aged woman to suffer from". ("Night of the Nearly Dead")
- Mrs Dunne, whose husband Mr Dunne tried to wash a cup last year and burnt the house down. ("Night of the Nearly Dead")
- Mrs Collins, whose husband Mr Collins tried to make his own bed last year and lost a leg. ("Night of the Nearly Dead")
- Paddy Short, who was "lured" to the Holy Stone of Clonrichert "and then they beat him with a stick". Does not appear in the series. ("Tentacles of Doom")
- Paddy Jordan, who runs the Craggy Island Greyhound Track. ("The Plague")
- The Rudest Couple, an aggressively territorial man and wife who show bitter and disinhibited annoyance at Father Ted for sitting in their picnic spot. They use the words "fup off", "backstard" and "grasshole" in order to comply with the picnic area's "no swearing" rule in "The Old Grey Whistle Theft".
- Eugene, who, in "Going to America", as he is leaving the church after mass comments to Father Ted that his sermon "bored the arse off me". After being asked "What the hell was it about anyway?", Father Ted balks, leaving Eugene to exclaim "Ah jaysus" as he walks away. (Eugene is played by the same actor as the character "Pat")
- Mrs Gleeson and Mrs Millet, Two housewives who, while waiting for Pat Mustard to deliver more than just dairy products, are shocked to see Dougal arriving at the door in "Speed 3". Dougal does not suspect a thing, only realising that they had undressed before answering the door much later.
- Brian Noonan, a very important junior minister who is a personal friend of Bishop Brennan. He and his family are frightened by seeing Father Jack sleepwalking naked, angering the bishop, who visits the parochial house to inspect the security arrangements.

=== Inhabitants of the Mainland ===
- Mrs Dineen, Mrs Doyle's friend whom she meets and spends an afternoon with in the tearoom, only to later get into a fight over who should pay the bill, leading to both being arrested. She later reappeared in Escape from Victory where she watched the football match with Mrs Doyle.
- Mrs O'Dwyer, Mrs Doyle's friend who was "robbed", meaning that she herself was stolen.
- Mr Sweeney, whose house was broken into and who was forced into a bra by the intruder. A victim of 200 cases of "forced transvestism" in the space of one year.
- Optician, analyses Father Jack's level of eyesight, using a new eye chart given away in a Carlsberg promotion. The eye chart reads "DRINK" over and over again with the letters getting smaller each time. Because Jack read all the way down the chart, she thinks his eyesight is perfect until Ted tells her about Jack's fondness for saying that particular word. She later uses one given to her by a Slovak company known as "Feck Arse Industries", which shows the words "FECK ARSE" repeatedly, with the letters getting smaller each time.
- Tour Guide, shows Fathers Ted and Dougal and Richard Wilson amongst others around The Caves. He has great difficulty in not shouting Richard Wilson's catchphrase from One Foot in the Grave to his face when Wilson says that he does not want to hear it again.
- Ronald, an AA member who is in a meeting also attended by Father Jack, who loudly exclaims "Yes!" in response to Ronald talking about a time when he would drink more than a pint of vodka each day. He later spots Father Jack indulging in alcohol in a pub. He tries to stop him, and is last seen being carried away in an ambulance after being punched out (off-screen) by Jack. Jack is subsequently arrested and has to be bailed out by Ted.

=== Celebrities ===
- Henry Sellers (played by Niall Buggy), jovial game-show host and ex-alcoholic, who comes to the Island to host the All-Priests Stars in Their Eyes Lookalikes Competition, after the abrupt termination of a career as a game show host in England. Ted unwittingly allows Mrs Doyle to pester him into accepting an offer of a glass of sherry before bed, after which he drunkenly trashes the parochial house and runs riot around the Craggy Island countryside. Ted and Mrs Doyle were unaware of his extreme alcoholism, which earlier cost him his job at the BBC. Sergeant Lewis brings him down with a tranquilliser gun at 75 yards. He later goes on another drunken rampage after drinking prosecco, although Ted and the others try to discourage him from drinking this time.
- Richard Wilson (star of One Foot in the Grave) as himself. Upon hearing Ted's quoting of his character Victor Meldrew's catchphrase, "I don't believe it", he violently attacks Ted and hurls insults and threats at him. He is later enraged again by Ted remarking "I don't believe it", and goes insane when Ted exclaims the same phrase and it echoes through the caves. However, when he stops at the parochial house for directions and sees Ted yet again, he remarks "I don't believe it!"
- Eoin McLove, played by Patrick McDonnell, sickly-sweet television presenter and pop singer (hits include "My Lovely Mayo Mammy"). His only popularity is amongst middle-aged and elderly women, and he is completely dependent on others to perform even the simplest tasks for him, such as opening doors. He visits the Parochial House when Mrs Doyle wins a poetry competition. At one point he tries to justify his behaviour by saying "I've no willy". Based on Irish singer Daniel O'Donnell.
- Patsy, played by Maria Doyle Kennedy, is Eoin McLove's manager and dogsbody.
- Lazlo St Pierre and John Morgan, night-time and morning DJs respectively on a local radio station which Ted, Jack and Dougal listen to while driving back from Father Finnegan's. Voiced by the writers; Graham Linehan, and Arthur Mathews in yet another little cameo.
- Terry MacNamee (Gerard Lee), producer of the TV programme Faith of Our Fathers.
- Charles Hedges (played by Peter Caffrey) and Fred Rickwood (played by Jon Kenny), a gay couple; respectively, producer and presenter of "A Song For Ireland". When offstage, Fred is dirty and disheveled and his speech is entirely incoherent, yet when he appears on camera he inexplicably becomes clean, well-dressed, and charismatic.
- Niamh Connolly (played by Clare Grogan), a radical feminist pop singer based on Sinéad O'Connor, who condemns the Catholic Church for various (unlikely) atrocities during the Great Famine. She comes to Craggy Island in an attempt to create a safe haven for victims of intolerance and hypocrisy. Dougal mistakenly "sells" the Parochial House to her.
- Father Ben and Father Brendan, the stars of a TV sitcom called "Father Ben" that is much enjoyed by Ted and Dougal. It is the in-universe version of Father Ted and it follows the lives of Father Ben and Father Brendan, and even appears to take place in the same house. The series included a cameo appearance by Father Ted co-creator Arthur Mathews as the long-suffering Ben. In fact they both bear a startling resemblance to Ted and Dougal. In the short segment of the show that appears in the episode "The Plague", Father Brendan has shorts on his head, and Dougal remarks that "Brendan's an awful eejit".

=== Other characters ===
- Gerry Gleason and Mrs Gleason, a hapless couple at Kilkelly Caravan Park who have their caravan invaded, their lovemaking spied on, their private ablutions interrupted and their lives generally made a misery by the priests from the Island. In addition Mr Gleason is carried naked through the countryside on the bonnet of Ted's car, and thrown to the ground. Mrs Gleason returns briefly during the "Speed 3" episode when Dougal delivers her milk; she thinks it will be Pat Mustard, so she is topless and screams when Dougal arrives.
- Mrs Millett, a housewife who appears briefly during the "Speed 3" episode when Dougal delivers her milk; she thinks it will be Pat Mustard, so she is naked ("in the nip", as Dougal later recalls) and screams when Dougal arrives.
- The St Luke's Youth Group, shepherded by Father Noel Furlong and comprising Gerry Fields, Janine Reilly (who Noel Furlong thinks "would love to screech"), Tony Lynch (hypothetically eaten by Father Furlong who then shouts "shut up" to his face) and Nuala Ryan. Last seen heading off on Aer Lingus flights to Paraguay, having finally escaped Father Noel.
- Mrs O'Reilly, one of the women made love to by sex-addicted milkman Pat Mustard in Speed 3. Theresa O'Reilly has the distinction of being the only "Mrs" on Craggy Island to have her first name revealed, apart from Mary who runs the shop.
- Father Peter Clifford (Stephen Tompkinson) and Assumpta Fitzgerald (Dervla Kirwan) from the BBC drama series Ballykissangel, who appear in Ted's dream in "A Christmassy Ted".
- Dermot Stone (James Beswick) and Mrs Stone (Kate Binchy), who say it is a "terrible thing" that their son has been struck by lightning, but at the same time are distressed that he survived. Mr Stone's extroverted character is in stark contrast to his son.
- Mammy (Joane Hall), Father Stone's sinister grandmother who horrifies Ted when she whispers to him that she "knows what (Ted's) 'up to'", frightening Ted into thinking that she knows he asked God to do away with Father Stone.
- Tarot reader, a charlatan who reads Ted's fortune when Dougal backs out in "Good Luck, Father Ted". When Ted is uncertain about crossing her palm with silver, she says: "Gimme a pound!"
- Surly youth, appears under the cliffs in "Good Luck, Father Ted", watching men playing bodhráns and dancing a jig.
- Laura Sweeney (Zara Turner), the senior partner from law firm, Corless, Corless & Sweeney, and executor of Jack's will, who punches and swears at Ted when he and Dougal laugh at the notion of her being a solicitor. ("Grant unto Him Eternal Rest")
- Mr Pearson, Ted and Dougal tried to stay with him for a second week of their holiday one year but his house, it turned out, was not a guesthouse. ("Hell")
- The fellow from England, touched the Holy Stone of Clonrichert and grew a beard. Never appears in the series. ("Tentacles of Doom"),
- Mwengwe, Ted and Dougal's friend from Addis Ababa. Mentioned in Cigarettes Alcohol and Rollerblading. He is supposed to have a satellite antenna in his house.

=== Pets and other animals ===
- Sampras, Dougal's pet rabbit, named after Pete Sampras (because of some bizarre perceived connection between tennis and rabbits that Dougal does not explain).
- Ronaldo, Dougal's escape-prone, cycling hamster (named after the Brazilian striker Ronaldo).
- Chris, Fargo Boyle's multiple winner of "King of The Sheep" who suffers a crisis of confidence and starts burping.
- Big Brendan, another burping sheep who won the King of the Sheep in 1983, but Ted was convinced it was a "fluke."
- The Ants, a colony of giant ants living in the field that the Parochial House is in, which Dougal investigates with binoculars.
- Éamonn, the rabbit that Dougal bets £10 on at the Craggy Island Greyhound Track when Ted tries to race the rabbits in "The Plague".
- The Beast of Craggy Island, a fictional beast, which is scaring everybody on the Island. Ted and Dougal later find out a Stereogram hanging from a tree is responsible for the noises believed to be made by the beast. ("Chirpy Burpy Cheap Sheep")
- Brick, Father Jack's very own pet brick, which he lovingly cares for, only to have a sudden change of heart and hurl it at Ted.
