= Old Grey Whistle Theft =

- Father Ted episode
- Father Ted (foreground) and Father Jack (background)
- Episode no.: Series 2 Episode 4
- Directed by: Declan Lowney
- Written by: Graham Linehan; Arthur Mathews
- Cinematography by: Chris Owen
- Editing by: Mykola Pawluk; Tim Waddell
- Original air date: 29 March 1996

Guest appearances
- Joe Rooney as Father Damien Lennon; John Olohan as Sergeant Hodgins; Tony Guilfoyle as Father Larry Duff; Rio Fanning as Father Frost; Arthur Mathews and Charlotte Bradley as Picnic Couple; Mal Whyte as Benson; Don Foley as Jim; Patrick Drury as John; Rynagh O'Grady as Mary; Ann Rowan as Mrs Glynn

Episode chronology
| ← Previous "Tentacles of Doom" | Next → "A Song for Europe" |

"Old Grey Whistle Theft" is the fourth episode of the second series of the Channel 4 sitcom Father Ted. The title is a pun on the BBC TV music show The Old Grey Whistle Test.

== Synopsis ==
Ted prepares for a picnic outing with other priests, but find they have been waylaid, while Dougal makes an excuse not to go so he can spend more time with a rebellious new priest, Father Damien "Damo" Lennon, who behaves like an insolent teenager. Ted expresses his concerns about Damien to Dougal, but Dougal continues to hang out with him. Ted decides to go to the desolate picnic area by himself. However, he is forced to take Jack with him, after Jack recognised a bottle of Jacob's Creek Chardonnay from 1991 that Ted was taking, just by hearing the bottle clinking (despite Ted trying to convince him that it is just fizzy water), and demanded a drink; Jack very quickly drinks the whole bottle when Ted's back is turned. Despite no one else being there, a couple of aggressive regulars accost Ted, demanding they move, and the overzealous groundskeeper Benson intercedes, blowing his whistle frequently. Ted, disgusted, leaves with Jack.

That night, an unknown person steals Benson's whistle, and the next day the whole of Craggy Island is in arms about the theft; Benson is so traumatised about the theft that he has lost the use of his leg and is forced to use a wheelchair. Ted discovers the whistle in a pack of cigarettes in Dougal's coat, and starts to get Dougal to confess. Just then, Benson and Sergeant Hodgkins arrive at the parochial house, with news that a witness to the crime said it was done by a priest. Dougal, having misinterpreted what Ted was telling him, states Ted stole the whistle. Shocked, Ted leaves to come up with an explanation. While he is out of the room, Father Frost arrives, dragging Damien with him, having discovered he was the actual thief and that he tried to frame Dougal. Ted returns, and starts a long fabrication of the reasons for stealing the whistle until he realises the case has been solved. After the others leave, Ted gives Dougal a lecture about trusting those who are "cool". He explains that there is no place in the Roman Catholic Church for bad apples such as Father Damien, the Bishop of Galway (a priest who lived with his housekeeper), and a priest who was running guns into Iraq – "the list goes on and on". He then asks Dougal if he has learned anything from this, to which Dougal replies, "No".

== Production ==
Arthur Mathews plays the irate man who – strictly observing the picnic area's no-swearing rule – tells Ted to, "Fup off, you grasshole!"

== Legacy ==
In 2015, Joe Rooney said that he would be interested in making a Father Damo spin-off, and suggested that Damo would probably be working in The Projects in New York City, living with "a girl and a gay fella" and rapping Mass. In 2016, Rooney reprised the role of Damo for an Over The Top wrestling match alongside Patrick McDonnell and Michael Redmond as Eoin McLove and Father Stone.
