= Going to America =

- Father Ted episode
- From left to right: Father Jack (Frank Kelly), Mrs Doyle (Pauline McLynn), Father Dougal (Ardal O'Hanlon). Father Ted can be seen in the background
- Episode no.: Series 3 Episode 8
- Directed by: Graham Linehan, Andy de Emmony
- Written by: Arthur Mathews, Graham Linehan
- Original air date: 1 May 1998

Guest appearances
- Tommy Tiernan as Father Kevin; Jeff Harding as Father Buzz Cagney; Mark Doherty as Father Alan; Hugh B. O'Brien as Eugene; Brian Eno as Father Brian Eno

Episode chronology
← Previous "Night of the Nearly Dead"	Next → —

"Going to America" is the series finale of the Channel 4 sitcom Father Ted. It is the eighth episode of the third series, and the 25th episode overall. Dermot Morgan, who played the show's title character, died the day after filming was completed.

== Synopsis ==
Father Kevin falls victim to depression.

After Ted prevents a depressed Father Kevin (Tommy Tiernan) from jumping to his death at the "It's Great Being a Priest" conference, an American priest, Father Buzz Cagney (Jeff Harding), asks him if he will come to a parish in Los Angeles. Ted cannot wait and excitedly tells Jack, Dougal and Mrs. Doyle, who incorrectly think they will be able to come with him. Ted does not have the heart to tell them otherwise and brings them to the airport, dumping them there while he gets on the plane. However, Ted has second thoughts when Buzz mentions the gang culture around Ted's new parish in Los Angeles and its violent state. Realising he will be in a worse situation, Ted abandons going on his trip and rejoins Jack, Dougal and Mrs Doyle. It transpires that the three of them never wanted to go to the States anyway, with the possible exception of Jack, who yells 'Feck!' when he learns of what has gone wrong, though the promise of a drink cheers him up. The group leaves the airport and heads for home, and Ted resigns himself to the fact he is probably going to be on Craggy Island for the rest of his life. The scene then transits to a montage of moments from every episode of the series in reverse order, ending with Ted and Dougal wishing each other goodnight.

=== Alternative ending ===
The episode was always intended to be the last Father Ted; in the original script, the last scene was to be set at the "It's Still Great Being a Priest" conference with Father Kevin once again on the window ledge and once again Ted arriving on the ledge, except this time it is not to stop him from jumping but to join him, because he was depressed that the intended trip to America fell through and he would have to stay on Craggy Island forever. This ending was abandoned in favour of a montage of clips from all three series of the show. The writers had initial concerns that their original conclusion would not work – Morgan's sudden death confirmed their decision to drop the ending, with the idea now seeming especially tacky.

The episode was filmed on 27 February 1998. Dermot Morgan died from a heart attack the following day, at age 45.
