= Grant Unto Him Eternal Rest =

- Father Ted episode
- Father Dougal (left) and Father Ted (right)
- Episode no.: Series 1 Episode 6
- Directed by: Declan Lowney
- Written by: Graham Linehan; Arthur Mathews
- Original air date: 26 May 1995

Guest appearances
- Mairead McKinley as Sister Monica; Zara Turner as Laura Sweeney; Kevin Sharkey as Donegal Priest; Tommy Duggan as Father Paul Cleary; Jimmy Keogh as Father Fintan Fay; Shay Gorman as Father Jim Sutton

Episode chronology
← Previous "And God Created Woman"	Next → "Hell"

"Grant Unto Him Eternal Rest" is the sixth episode of the Channel 4 sitcom Father Ted and the season one finale. It was the first episode to be scripted and submitted by the writers.

== Synopsis ==
Sister Monica has visited the Parochial House. As she sits calmly, Dougal's only idea for conversation is "So, you're a nun?" At that point, Ted enters, saying they plan to visit the Holy Stone of Clonrichert, and Sister Monica says she will go to freshen up. Dougal says she's wanting to "impress the lads" and is confused when Ted comments on nuns providing "a woman's touch". When Sister Monica returns, Dougal confuses her by saying, "Ted says you were touching him."

Meanwhile, in Jack's room, Jack is sitting motionless in his chair, with many bottles of alcohol and floor polish around him. He appears dead, but Dougal passes him off as merely "very drunk", saying "I haven't seen him this bad since he disappeared with Sister Imelda" ("the Blue Nun"). Dougal holds up an empty bottle of floor polish called 'Purge: Floor Polish'. Ted lectures Jack on what "the Windolene did to you" and Sister Monica enters. She checks his pulse, and after also noticing rigor mortis and decomposition, concludes that he has died.

Sister Monica tells Dougal to perform the last rites. He demonstrates his incompetence through a long speech, saying, "I don't know if I should be looking up down here or up there, and you're up there with our Lord and Stalin and Bob Marley and my parents". When prompted by Monica to say the Latin, Dougal reads "last rites" consisting of the names of Italian footballers Alessandro Costacurta and Roberto Baggio (this stems from Graham Linehan and Ardal O'Hanlon being fans of Football Italia).

At Jack's funeral, Mrs Doyle goes around pestering priests to have a sandwich. Meanwhile, Father Fay and another priest (who is in hysterics) shakes his fist at the ceiling, saying, "You bastard!" and then falls to his knees, exclaiming, "Imagine, Ted! A Polish Pope! It should've been Jack!" and Father Fay goes crazy, throwing books off the bookshelf.

Dougal, later, then fools around, sitting in Jack's old chair and acting like him by uttering his numerous catchphrases, until Ted catches him. Mrs Doyle announces that a woman has come to see the remaining Craggy Island priests; she is Laura Sweeney, the executor of Jack's will, and tells them that Jack was actually very rich and has left £500,000 between Ted and Dougal. However, this bequest is on condition that they spend one night with Jack's body, because of his great fear of being buried alive and of enclosed spaces, a fear which caused him not to take confessions ("also, he just didn't want to do it"). When they tell Miss Sweeney that they'll need to discuss the inheritance with the solicitor, they are greatly amused when she tells them that she is the solicitor, with Dougal telling her "if you're a solicitor, I'm Boy George".

The next scene commences with Dougal sitting by Jack's coffin singing "Karma Chameleon", and Ted nursing wounds after Miss Sweeney flew into a rage and punched him and swore at him after they did not believe her claims that she was the solicitor. Ted and Dougal then muse about how Jack managed to save up so much money during his life, by never giving to charity and not wearing trousers during summer, among other things. They also comment on him being the first priest to "denounce the Beatles" ("he could see what they were up to"). Ted remarks that a friend of his, Father Jimmy Ranable, studied under Jack in his youth and praised his teaching methods. When Dougal asks where Jimmy is now, Ted replies "Remember the Drumshanbo massacre? That was him." Flashbacks are shown of Jack as an especially vicious teacher at a Catholic school, beating male students with a hurley stick, and telling them they would all burn for eternity in Hell. He is also shown punching Ted over a game of chess.

Ted and Dougal, bored, then play charades, at which Dougal fails miserably, before they settle down on the floor in their sleeping bags. Dougal enquires whether Ted believes in an afterlife, prompting Ted to ask Dougal if he became a priest through sending in "twelve packets of crisps". Dougal also asks how Ted plans to spend his money, with Ted lying to him by telling him he'll give it to charity, while envisioning partying and gambling.

While Dougal sleeps, Ted gets up and looks out on the snow falling, quoting from The Dead as he does so. Father Jack, standing behind him, shouts, "Shut the feck up!", causing Ted to pass out from the shock of seeing him, waking Dougal, who then does the same.

Back at the parochial house, with Jack back in his chair, Ted explains that the floor polish had brought about all the symptoms of death, but that it just wore off. The pair, clearly very disappointed at losing out on the inheritance, then head to the shops to buy some more floor polish, suggesting that they might start leaving it round the house, or even in Jack's room, "in case we run out".

The episode ends with Jack turning to camera and telling the audience to "Feck off!"

== Production ==
Although this episode was aired as a series finale, it was the first episode written. It was based on an earlier script Linehan and Mathews had written for Irish Lives, their planned mockumentary series. Each episode would have focused on a different character living in Ireland. In the Father Ted Crilly episode, Ted visited all the priests with whom he had been in the seminary. Father Jack was a priest who died shortly before Ted arrived, and whom Ted failed to realise was dead.

In the finished episode, the scene where Ted finds Jack seemingly dead is largely intact from the mockumentary draft. While reworking the premise as a sitcom for Channel 4, the writers were not confident that they could write a full episode. They submitted only the scene where Ted finds Jack dead and several of the philosophical conversations the characters had in the crypt, which they thought were a "handy way of exploring the characters and also telling the people at Channel 4 what the style of the comedy would be, that's it's these two priests who don't seem to know a lot about religion". Linehan noted that one of the great things about writing a "silly sitcom" is that the writers can invent rules: Jack can die and come back to life "because his body works differently from other people". The executives were bemused by an incomplete story where one of the main characters was dead, but commissioned the series soon after receiving the full script.

In retrospect, Linehan and Mathews noticed that the plot was very similar to that of the Fawlty Towers episode "The Kipper and the Corpse". Despite being fans of the show, they only noticed the parallels afterwards, and would probably have abandoned the episode if they had seen them earlier.

Kevin Sharkey, who plays the black Donegal priest, was a friend of the writers, and was brought in specifically for a one-line joke.

The flashbacks with Father Jack abusing students were inspired by the Christian Brothers. Mathews said that he had the impression that Jack was a member of the order.

The writers had the idea for the elderly 'monkey' priest in a TV studio, when they were going to see Ben Elton's sketch show, which Mathews called "one of the worst comedy nights of my life". They created the character because they were "desperate for something to laugh at".

The writers expressed some regret over the charades scene, regarding it as a lazy way to fill screentime.

Ted's speech about death was quoted from the ending of The Dead, John Huston's film adaptation of James Joyce's short story.
