= Henry Sellers =

Henry Sellers may refer to:

- J. Henry Sellers (1861–1954), English architect and furniture designer
- Henry Sellers, a character in "Competition Time", a Father Ted episode
