= The dancing priest =

The dancing priest may refer to:

- Neil Horan, former Roman Catholic priest notorious for interrupting sporting events
- Fr. Liam Finnegan, fictional character from the sitcom Father Ted
