= Think Fast, Father Ted =

- Father Ted episode
- Father Ted attempts to fix the car
- Episode no.: Series 2 Episode 2
- Directed by: Declan Lowney
- Written by: Graham Linehan; Arthur Mathews
- Cinematography by: Chris Owen
- Editing by: Mykola Pawluk; Tim Waddell
- Original air date: 15 March 1996

Guest appearances
- James Benson as Father Liam Finnegan; Gerry O'Brien as Father Billy O'Dwyer; Ben Keaton as Father Austin Purcell

Episode chronology
← Previous "Hell"	Next → "Tentacles of Doom"

"Think Fast, Father Ted" is the second episode of the second series of the Channel 4 sitcom Father Ted. The title is a play on the novel Think Fast, Mr. Moto by John P. Marquand, and the film of the same title starring Peter Lorre.

== Synopsis ==
The parochial house has a leak in its roof, which happens to be over Jack's head. Ted and Dougal move him, only to have another leak start over Jack's new position. Ted decides to hold a raffle to raise money for the roof. He calls Bishop Brennan and secures permission to raffle a blue 1985 Rover 213 SE. Ted and Dougal leave to retrieve the Rover. Upon their return, Dougal spots a small dent on the bonnet. Ted is dismayed and tries to "tap it away" with a hammer from the tool kit, but ends up creating another small dent, which he also tries to fix. After much time has passed, Ted has only succeeded in destroying the car's exterior.

Realising that they are in dire straits if Bishop Brennan should learn what was done to the Rover (which Ted states was worth £7000), Ted decides to procure another. The priests remember that Father Finnegan, the so-called "dancing priest" (as he dances for peace), has a Rover identical to the ruined original. Ted comes up with the idea to simply get a lend of the Rover from Finnegan, and then organise the raffle so that he and Dougal would win it, and be able to return the car afterwards. Dougal initially disapproves, but agrees when Ted points out that the plan will stop the Bishop killing them in anger, and that as such they are "saving a Bishop's soul."

The next day, they travel to Finnegan's home to borrow the Rover. Ted gets permission and the keys. As soon as Ted leaves his sight, Father Finnegan suffers a fatal heart attack.

Ted's scheme for rigging the raffle involves filling a hat with a load of tickets that all bear the number 11, which will be Dougal's number, and Ted himself, as the Master of Ceremonies, drawing and calling that number on stage while Dougal waits in the audience. On the night of the event, Ted and Dougal work feverishly to sell tickets. They also secure Father Billy O'Dwyer, a.k.a. "The Spinmaster", to provide music. However, he only has one record ("Ghost Town" by The Specials) and a major gambling problem, which results in his purchase of 2000 raffle tickets. Later, the announcement that the organisers have won the raffle manages to suck the life out of the event.

Back at the parochial house, Mrs. Doyle reveals that Father Finnegan has died from a heart attack, most likely brought on by excessive continuous dancing. Ted and Dougal realise that they will be able to keep the car. However, things turn to the worse quickly. Ted discovers that an inebriated Father Jack has driven the car to the shops to acquire more drink. He asks Father Jack what he has done with the car. Jack explains curtly that the car was hit by not one, but two trucks. When Ted and Dougal inspect the damage, they discover that although the front half is intact (except for a partially detached number plate), the rear half has been crushed beyond repair. While they are out, Father O'Dwyer steals the raffle money to pay off his debts.

With the weatherman predicting rain until August, and the leak getting worse and worse, Ted, Jack, Dougal and Mrs Doyle are forced to wear anoraks indoors, with Ted expressing outrage that someone could steal money from a priest, to which Dougal points out that the raffle was rigged. A tree is then struck by lightning, and subsequently falls and comes crashing straight through the roof. The episode ends with Father Austin Purcell, a priest who was in attendance at the raffle, rambling about random things.

== Production ==
The episode's title is a reference to the 1937 film Think Fast, Mr. Moto. At one point, the writers intended every episode title to contain the name "Father Ted", in reference to the Mr. Moto series, but they ran out of ideas for this format.

In the commentary, Linehan notes that this episode was where they began to expand Father Jack's vocabulary, with the "I'm a happy camper" scene. They considered writing an episode where Jack's eloquent, articulate brother visits, also played by Frank Kelly, most likely titled "Double Trouble", but decided the concept would be too clichéd.

At the time of writing this episode, Mathews was "obsessed" with the poor special effects of Alfred Hitchcock's 1963 film The Birds. The non sequitur scene where the priests are attacked by birds was originally an attempt to recreate the film's backwards tracking shot, with people running and waving their hands, which Mathews found unintentionally hilarious. Linehan notes that the joke did not translate well in the final episode, because the special effect for the birds was actually quite good.

The dancing priest was inspired by Neil Horan, a real Catholic priest who "danced for peace". A young Aidan Gillen auditioned for the role. As part of the audition, he had to dance alongside Linehan (who performed Ted's lines). According to Linehan, Gillen became so embarrassed by the situation that he ran out of the building and never returned. Ben Keaton also auditioned for the part, but the writers were so impressed by his performance that they gave him the larger role of Father Purcell.

In retrospect, the writers were unsure what the joke in Father Purcell's line "Ah, it's yourself!" was. Linehan thought the joke was that Purcell believed the throw blanket was really Jesus, while Mathews thought the joke was that Purcell would simply talk to anything. The credits scene, where Father Purcell talks to himself in the closet, was almost entirely improvised by Keaton.

Linehan notes that some people think "Ghost Town" by The Specials is an inherently funny song because of its use in the episode, while the joke was originally that it is simply "not a floor filler".

Mathews plays one of the four priests in the Kraftwerk-esque band at the raffle, Linehan plays the voice of radio presenter John Morgan, from "The John Morgan Morning Show", and the weatherman on the television is voiced by director Declan Lowney. None of the three were credited for their cameo appearances.

== Legacy ==
In 2014, Ben Keaton returned to the role of Father Purcell, performing a stand-up routine and hosting pub quizzes entirely in character. Keaton also set up a Twitter page for the character, and a website where fans can purchase customised Father Purcell video greetings.
