= Night of the Nearly Dead =

- Father Ted episode
- Father Ted (left) on a gameshow
- Episode no.: Series 3 Episode 7
- Directed by: Graham Linehan, Andy de Emmony
- Written by: Arthur Mathews, Graham Linehan
- Original air date: 24 April 1998

Guest appearances
- Patrick McDonnell as Eoin McLove; Maria Doyle Kennedy as Patsy; Elva Crowley as Mrs. Boyle; Rosemary Kennedy as Mrs. Dunne; Vincent Marzello as a Television Psychiatrist; Maggie Shevlin as Mrs. Collins

Episode chronology
← Previous "Kicking Bishop Brennan Up the Arse"	Next → "Going to America"

"Night of the Nearly Dead" is the seventh, and penultimate, episode of the third and final series of the Channel 4 sitcom Father Ted. The episode's title and some of the scenes are a parody on the movie Night of the Living Dead.

== Synopsis ==
Mrs Doyle, as well as several other middle-aged and elderly women, are devoted fans of the boyish and dimwitted television presenter and pop superstar Eoin McLove. Eoin holds a contest for the best ode to him, offering a visit to the winner. Mrs Doyle's poem is announced as the winner, and she eagerly prepares for his visit. While shopping, one of her friends, Mrs Boyle, asks when Eoin will be arriving. Mrs Doyle admits it is supposed to be a secret, but tells her it will be that Sunday, and ask she not tell anyone else. Mrs Boyle promises, but quickly goes back on her word, and news of Eoin's arrival quickly spreads around Craggy Island.

Eoin arrives at the parochial house along with his assistant Patsy. Mrs Doyle is overly nervous about meeting Eoin, while Eoin seems more disinterested and wants to know when the visit will be over. As the night draws on, Ted discovers that numerous middle-aged women have congregated outside the house, all wanting to see and touch Eoin. They become so dense as to make it impossible for Eoin or Patsy to leave, and Ted offers them to stay the night. During the night, the women wander around outside the house like zombies, while Eoin's childish behaviour (including eating jam directly from the jar and claiming that Jack "smells of wee") rubs Ted, Dougal, and Jack the wrong way. He even slights Mrs Doyle by rejecting the gift of a jumper she had baked into a banana cake for him.

The women are still outside the next morning, staring through the windows at Eoin sleeping in one of the chairs. Ted tries to wave them away, but they compliment him on his last mass, and Ted absent-mindedly opens the window to talk to them clearly. The women enter the house and start approaching Eoin. Ted, Dougal, Eoin and Patsy flee to the upstairs bathroom but are followed by the mass of women. As they start to grab at Eoin, a rooster's call is heard, as day has broken. Mrs Doyle and Ted remind the women that their husbands will be getting up and will be wanting breakfast soon, and they best return their homes if they do not want any disasters to befall them. The women quickly funnel out and leave.

Eoin prepares to leave, and gives Mrs Doyle a peck on the cheek, causing her to faint. Patsy, knowing from Dougal that Ted wants to be on television, offers him an opportunity to guest on one of Eoin's shows. Later, during this show, Eoin quizzes Ted on William Shatner's TekWar, Ted's favourite book, for a cash prize. He gets all the questions right, but falters on the final round, unable to answer "what was John Paul II's name before he became Pope?"; his answer is "Jim".
