= Father Jack =

Father Jack may refer to the following fictional characters:

- Father Jack Hackett, a character in the television series Father Ted.
- Father Jack Mundy, a character in the Brian Friel play Dancing at Lughnasa
