= Speed 3 =

- Father Ted episode
- Father Dougal driving his compromised milk float
- Episode no.: Series 3 Episode 3
- Directed by: Andy DeEmmony
- Written by: Graham Linehan, Arthur Mathews
- Original air date: 27 March 1998

Guest appearances
- Pat Laffan as Pat Mustard; John Rogan as Mr. Fox; Eamon Morrissey as Father Derek Beeching; Arthur Mathews as Father Clarke; Gail Fitzpatrick as Mrs. Millet

Episode chronology
← Previous "Chirpy Burpy Cheap Sheep"	Next → "The Mainland"

"Speed 3" is the third episode of the third series of the Channel 4 sitcom Father Ted and the 20th episode overall. The episode parodies the action-thriller film Speed and the sequel Speed 2: Cruise Control. "Speed 3" was written after the show's writers Graham Linehan and Arthur Mathews asked themselves: "How can we make a worse sequel than Speed 2?" This episode was voted the fans' favourite episode on Channel 4's "Father Ted Night".

== Plot ==
Fathers Ted and Dougal return to the parochial house from the Annual Baby of the Year Competition, as Ted comments on how many of the babies were "hairy". Mrs. Doyle becomes excited when she spots the milkman arriving, putting on a fancier dress and makeup. The milkman introduces himself as Pat Mustard, a boastful, mustachioed man to whom Mrs. Doyle has taken a liking. Ted connects the hairy babies to Pat, believing him to be committing adultery with the housewives on Craggy Island during his rounds. Pat challenges Ted to prove this, and Ted and Dougal proceed to spy on Pat's rounds, collecting enough evidence to get Pat fired. Dougal expresses a wish to become a milkman and is given the vacant position as Craggy Island needs to be rid of the milk overstocking problem after the island agreed to ease up the milk surplus from Kraftanova, a newly liberated country in Eastern Europe, by buying 70,000 tons of its milk.

At the parochial house, Ted trips up over a brick. He learns from Mrs. Doyle that Jack is keeping the brick as a "pet", but Jack soon changes his mind and throws the brick at Ted. Ted then receives a call from Pat, who, in revenge for losing his job, has planted a bomb on Dougal's milk float, which is set to arm if it exceeds 4 miles per hour and detonate if the speed drops below that. Ted is so worried that he forgets to hang up the phone and goes to warn Dougal as he works his rounds. Dougal is oblivious to the housewives having prepared themselves for Pat's arrival, including one that answers the door topless while another is fully naked. Eventually, Ted catches up to Dougal to warn him of the bomb, but he has already exceeded four. He directs Dougal to a roundabout while he races back to the house to confer with Fathers Beeching and Clarke.

After the priests give Dougal Mass and rule out giving it again, Ted trips over Jack's brick again. He gets the idea to put the brick onto the float's accelerator so they can rescue Dougal without triggering the bomb. Dougal is safely offloaded, and the float drives off on its own. Pat continues to taunt Ted over the phone, oblivious that he is no longer there, until the milk float crashes into the phone booth. The bomb detonates, causing an explosion that is heard at the North Pole, and Pat is killed instantly.

As Dougal gets into bed that night, he questions why he even wanted to become a milkman in the first place. Right after settling under the covers, he suddenly wakes up again and realizes in horror that the women he served during his rounds were naked.

Meanwhile, as Mrs. Doyle packs away her Pat Mustard memorabilia (including a giant spanner that he left with her after being unable to carry it on the milk float), Ted takes out the rubbish and sees an object in the sky. As he watches, the object – the brick from the float – slams into his head and knocks him out.

== Production ==
The idea for "Speed 3" came from the writers' Graham Linehan and Arthur Mathews having heard of the 1997 film Speed 2: Cruise Control but having never seen it, felt the idea of putting the action on a speeding boat was incredibly funny, and tried to find a way to make an even worse idea. This cemented the use of the milk float and having Dougal being its driver but required the writers to find a means to place Dougal in the role of a milkman. This led to the idea of having the previous milkman fired for being promiscuous with the housewives and having Ted try to figure out the mystery of the hairy babies.

At one point, they included a scene of a Mass being conducted on a flatbed truck pulled alongside the milk float. Linehan had generally ruled that they should not show Ted and the others doing their roles as clergy, but felt that having the Mass being performed at this point was "too good an opportunity to pass up". Mathews himself played the priest overseeing Mass.

Actor Pat Laffan had previously played the character of Georgie Burgess in The Snapper, a similar position as Pat was envisioned. Laffan had previously auditioned for Father Ted for Father Fintan Stack in "New Jack City" and also knew Pauline McLynn and Frank Kelly (Mrs. Doyle and Father Jack, respectively). Before production, Brendan O'Carroll read for the role of Pat Mustard.

Outdoor filming took place around Clare.

Pat Mustard's theme music is "The Penthouse Suite" by Syd Dale.

== Reception ==
The episode was voted the best ever by the show's fans in the Channel 4 Father Ted Night, which screened on 1 January 2011 to celebrate the 15th anniversary of the programme.
