= Feck =

Word with several meanings

Feck is a word that is used as a euphemism for the word fuck in Hiberno-(Irish) English.

== Irish English ==
- The most popular and widespread modern use of the term is as a slang expletive in Irish English, employed as a euphemism for the expletive "fuck" to express disbelief, surprise, pain, anger, or contempt. It lacks the sexual connotations that "fuck" has.
- It is also used as Irish slang meaning "throw" (e.g., "he fecked the remote control across the table at me")
- It has also been used as a verb meaning "to steal" (e.g., "they had fecked cash out of the rector's room") or to discover a safe method of robbery or cheating.

== In the media ==
The Channel 4 sitcom Father Ted (1995–1998) helped to popularise the use of "feck" outside of Ireland (particularly in the UK, where Channel 4 is based) through liberal use of the word by alcoholic priest Father Jack Hackett.

The word appears frequently and repeated multiple times in a row in The Beauty Queen of Leenane by Martin McDonagh, first performed in 1996.

In a 1998 interview on Nickelodeon, an appearance by the teenage Irish girl group B*Witched prompted a viewer complaint alleging that one of its members had said "fuck off" on air. Nickelodeon maintained that the singer had in fact said "feck off", which they described as "a phrase made popular by the Channel 4 sitcom Father Ted", but the phrase was still found to be in breach of the ITC Programme Code, and the complaint was thus upheld.

In 2004, clothing retailer French Connection UK (best known for its infamous "FCUK" T-shirt) won a legal injunction in Dublin that barred a local business from printing and selling a T-shirt marked "FCEK: The Irish Connection".

In 2008, the Irish cider brand Magners received complaints relating to an advert it had posted around the UK in which a man tells bees to "feck off", with members of the public concerned that young children could be badly influenced by it. Magners claimed that the "feck off" mention in the advert was a "mild rebuff" to the bees rather than an expletive. The Advertising Standards Authority ruled that the poster was suitable for display.

== See also ==
- Minced oath
- Cognate
- False cognate
- Hiberno-English – Turns of phrase
- Profanity
- Vulgarism

== Sources ==
- Walker, Colin S. K. Scottish Proverbs. Edinburgh: Birlinn Limited, 1996. ISBN 1-874744-30-0
- Webster's College Dictionary. New York City: Random House, 1996. ISBN 0-679-43886-6
- Webster's Revised Unabridged Dictionary. Springfield, Massachusetts: G. & C. Merriam Company Co., 1913.
- Irish Slang
- Irish Dictionary Online
