= Competition Time =

- Father Ted episode
- Father Dougal on stage, acting as Elvis Presley
- Episode no.: Series 1 Episode 4
- Directed by: Declan Lowney
- Written by: Graham Linehan; Arthur Mathews
- Original air date: 12 May 1995

Guest appearances
- Niall Buggy as Henry Sellers; Fergus O'Kelly as Father Barty Dunne; Maurice O'Donoghue as Father Dick Byrne; Don Wycherley as Father Cyril MacDuff; Chris Curran as Father Jim Johnson

Episode chronology
| ← Previous "The Passion of Saint Tibulus" | Next → "And God Created Woman" |

"Competition Time" is the fourth episode of the Channel 4 sitcom Father Ted.

== Synopsis ==
The annual "All Priests Stars in Their Eyes Lookalike Competition" is approaching. Ted, Dougal and Jack are preparing for their entries, though Ted is dismayed to find Dougal and Jack have dressed as Elvis Presley, as that was his plan. Father Dick Byrne, Ted's rival from the Rugged Island parochial house, calls Ted and taunts him that the Rugged Island priests will win this year. Ted insists that he will have a better chance at winning since the guest judge, TV presenter Henry Sellers, is staying at the Craggy Island parochial house.

Henry arrives with Father Barty Dunne, a priest who laughs continually at the slightest of things, as a result of which Henry is in a foul mood after the four-hour drive. Ted attempts to offer Henry anything he wants to try to gain favour, but Henry appears unimpressed and considers staying at the Rugged Island house. Mrs Doyle and Ted offer Henry a drink of sherry before bed, which he does his best to refuse, but ends up succumbing to Mrs Doyle's persistence ("Go on, go on, GO ON!"). Henry then goes on a drunken rampage after the single drink, destroying the house's living room before jumping out the window. Barty explains that Henry has been a raging alcoholic, which led to him being sacked by the BBC, but had been sober for a year. Ted, Dougal and the police track down, tranquillise and return Henry to the house. After he regains consciousness, they tell him nothing happened.

On the day of the contest, Dick calls Ted again and suggests a wager on the contest, which Ted accepts. Jack, who had earlier fled the house while hallucinating after drinking a bottle of Toilet Duck, returns in an extremely disheveled state, which gives Ted an idea. At the contest, Dick and his fellow priests (Cyril McDuff and Jim Johnson) perform as Diana Ross and two of the Supremes, scoring 9 out of 10. The Craggy Island parochial house act follows, paying tribute to the three ages of Elvis: the young version (performed by Dougal), the comeback version (by Ted) and his later years (by a half-awake Jack). Henry gives Craggy Island's show the victory with the maximum score: 10 out of 10. Back at the parochial house, Dick reluctantly pays Ted his winnings and leaves. Mrs Doyle offers everyone a glass of champagne, but as soon as Henry takes a sip (despite Ted urging him not to) he goes on another drunken rampage. Ted tells Dougal they will look for Henry again in the morning and spends the rest of the evening appreciating the tiny trophy they received for winning.

== Production ==
The character of Henry Sellers was based on a well-known English TV personality who enjoyed drink; writers Graham Linehan and Arthur Mathews heard from a friend in Hat Trick Productions that they had seen the presenter come home drunk one day and fall into a bush. This gave them the idea of a presenter character who is powerfully affected by alcohol. Jean Ainslie, who plays a contestant on Sellers' game show, was cast based on her performance in The Day Today.

Linehan regrets the storyline involving multiple characters dressing as Elvis Presley and considers it a "typical sign" of running out of ideas, and a particularly bad one in a programme's first series. One influence was Stars in Their Eyes, which was popular at the time of writing.

This episode introduces Rugged Island's three priests: Dick Byrne, Cyril McDuff and Jim Johnson, and their housekeeper, who bear a close resemblance to Ted, Dougal, Jack and Mrs Doyle. Maurice O'Donoghue, who plays Father Dick, was the writers' second choice for the role of Ted, being the right age and having a similar look and lightness. Mathews always preferred Dermot Morgan; Linehan was initially reluctant, fearing Morgan would play Ted in the same manner as his previous character "Father Trendy", but Morgan lobbied hard for the role. Linehan stated that they would have named the character Dick Byrne differently if the possible sexual connotations of the name had occurred to them.
