= Pat Laffan =

Irish actor (1939–2019)

- Born: Patrick Laffan; 8 June 1939; County Meath, Ireland
- Died: 14 March 2019 (aged 79); Dublin, Ireland
- Occupation: Actor
- Years active: 1964–2019

Patrick Laffan (8 June 1939 – 14 March 2019) was an Irish actor.

Laffan is best remembered for playing the lothario milkman Pat Mustard in the Channel Four sitcom Father Ted episode "Speed 3" (1998), and Mr Burgess in Roddy Doyle's The Snapper (1993).

== Filmography ==
Year	Title	Role	Notes
1964	Girl with Green Eyes	Bertie Counham	as Patrick Laffan
1969	Wedding Night	Dr. Farnum	as Patrick Laffan
1971	Flight of the Doves	Interviewer	Uncredited
1971	Mr Joyce is Leaving Paris	Stanislaus Joyce	TV movie
1972	A War of Children	British Soldier	TV movie
1975	Barry Lyndon	Nora's Brother #1	as Patrick Laffan
1981	Men of Consequence	Tom Nesbith	TV movie
1984	Painted Out	Advocate	TV movie
1984	Pigs	Detective 2	
1989	My Left Foot	Barman	as Patrick Laffan
1990	After Midnight	Head Chef	
1991	Hear My Song	Taxi Driver #1	
1991	The Treaty	Bishop	TV movie
1992	The Playboys	Duffy	
1992	The Bargain Shop	Charlie	
1993	Remember	Police Sergeant	TV movie
1993	The Snapper	Mr. Burgess	TV movie
1993	Fatal Inheritance	St. Patrick	as Patrick Laffan
1994	War of the Buttons	Mr. Connor	
1995	An Awfully Big Adventure	Mr. Harcourt	
1995	Sharpe's Sword	Connelly	TV movie
1996	Trojan Eddie	Matt	
1996	Space Truckers	Scummy	
1997	The Saint	Catholic Priest	
1997	The Serpent's Kiss	Pritchard	
1998	The General	Police Sgt. Patrick Higgins	
1999	Durango	Bill Gobberley	TV movie
1999	Park		
1999	Most Important	Billy McCartan	
2000	The Closer You Get	Giovanni	
2000	Country	Mick Clifford	
2001	How Harry Became a Tree	Father O'Connor	
2003	Intermission	Charlie O'Brien	
2003	The Boys from County Clare	Gerry, the Custom Officer	
2006	The Queen	Head Ghillie	
2007	Waiting for Dublin	Paddy	
2009	The Race	Minister	
2010	Leap Year	Donal	
2010	The Runway	Manus	
2011	War Horse	Devon Farmer #2	
