= Chirpy Burpy Cheap Sheep =

- Father Ted episode
- Father Dougal sitting on a chair, petting a sheep
- Episode no.: Series 3 Episode 2
- Directed by: Graham Linehan
- Written by: Graham Linehan, Arthur Mathews
- Original air date: 20 March 1998

Guest appearances
- Peadar Lamb as Fargo Boyle; Peter Dineen as Giant Reid; Pat McGrath as Hud Hastings; Patrick Drury as John; Rynagh O'Grady as Mary; Eamon Rohan as Judge

Episode chronology
← Previous "Are You Right There, Father Ted?"	Next → "Speed 3"

Chirpy Burpy Cheap Sheep is the second episode of the third series of the Channel 4 sitcom Father Ted.

== Synopsis ==
Ted wagers the entire year's heating allowance for the parochial house on the King of the Sheep competition, placing his bet on Chris, a sheep that has won the competition several times and is considered a certainty to triumph again. Unfortunately, Chris has heard rumours about a sheep-eating beast and is not feeling at all himself. With a very cold winter forecast for the year, Ted becomes worried about the possibility of losing the bet. He goes to John and Mary, who accepted the bet, to ask for his stake money back, but they refuse.

Chris's owner, Fargo Boyle, comes to the parochial house and begs Ted to help return Chris to his old self. After a week, Ted has successfully returned Chris's spirit. However, after he and Dougal hear sounds in the night and, upon investigation, discover them coming from a stereo in a tree (courtesy of an album of BBC Sound Effects), Ted finds out that Boyle arranged for Chris to be frightened by the beast to increase the meagre odds being offered for his victory.

On the day of the competition, just as Chris is about to be declared the winner, Ted makes a dramatic entry and exposes the plot, telling the judge his observations, including expensive items being worn by the other contestants (after Fargo paid them to spread rumours about the beast) and Fargo leaving a shop with a BBC Sound Effects record that Dougal had wanted to buy. The judge is appalled to hear about this plot, and Chris is instantly disqualified. Fargo begs Chris's forgiveness, but the sheep is apparently unforgiving.

Although Ted makes a dramatic exit, he is left kicking himself when Dougal points out that because Chris was disqualified, he has lost the bet, and thus all of the heating allowance money. The residents of the parochial house subsequently prepare to hibernate for the forthcoming extremely cold winter.
