= Peter Caffrey =

Irish actor

- Born: 18 April 1949; Dublin, Ireland
- Died: 1 January 2008 (aged 58); Shrewsbury, Shropshire, England
- Occupation: Actor
- Television: Padraig O'Kelly on Series 1-4 of Ballykissangel
- Spouse: Brenda Banks (m. 1980; div. 1990)

Peter Caffrey (18 April 1949 – 1 January 2008) was an Irish actor best known for playing Padraig O'Kelly on Series 1–4 of Ballykissangel and Christy Barry on Bracken. He was also known for playing the role of the Eurosong selection judge Charles Hedges in the Irish comedy Father Ted on the episode "A Song for Europe" and for voicing a popular Christmas radio advertisement for Barry's Tea in 1994.

Peter Caffrey was born in Dublin on the day the Republic of Ireland Act 1948 came into effect to create the Republic of Ireland. He studied at a seminary for two years before leaving to pursue an English degree at University College Dublin. He worked for a year as a primary school teacher, before becoming involved with Dublin's Project Theatre. He appeared in nearly thirty television and film roles, and also had a solid theatre career in both Dublin and London.

He married a woman named Brenda Banks in 1980.

After moving to London in 1983, he became a familiar face on UK television, with minor roles in Casualty, The Bill and Peak Practice.

After overcoming cancer of the mouth (a diagnosis he received in 1990), and despite a divorce from his wife in 1990, he achieved success in Ballykissangel.

Despite suffering a stroke in 2000, which left him paralysed on his right side, he managed to play a character with a similar affliction in Sweet Dancer in 2005 (a film which was never released).

He never fully recovered from the effects of his stroke, and died at the age of 58 on 1 January 2008 in Shrewsbury, Shropshire. His body was returned to Ireland for cremation in Mount Jerome Cemetery, Dublin, on 8 January 2008. Caffrey was survived by three sisters, Linda, Carol, and Sheila. His brother David had pre-deceased him in July 2007.
