= The Passion of Saint Tibulus =

- Father Ted episode
- Father Dougal (left) and Father Ted (right) "protesting" outside the cinema
- Episode no.: Series 1 Episode 3
- Directed by: Declan Lowney
- Written by: Graham Linehan; Arthur Mathews
- Original air date: 5 May 1995

Guest appearances
- Derrick Branche as Father Hernandez; Jim Norton as Bishop Brennan; Jon Kenny as Michael Cocheese

Episode chronology
← Previous "Entertaining Father Stone"	Next → "Competition Time"

"The Passion of Saint Tibulus" is the third episode of the first series of the Channel 4 sitcom Father Ted. Originally airing in 1995, the episode was rebroadcast on BBC2 in 2008 in tribute to Geoffrey Perkins.

Jon Kenny, who played Michael Cocheese, later said that the protest scenes were influenced by a priest he had known when he was a boy.

== Synopsis ==
Ted hosts Cuba's Father Hernandez at the Craggy Island Parochial House who, seeing Mrs Doyle, confesses he sometimes finds a life of celibacy difficult, and Ted mentions Bishop Brennan, who is rumoured to have a son who lives in America.

Bishop Brennan, after phoning Craggy Island Fathers to say he is coming over, arrives the next day and orders Ted and Dougal to protest against the showing of The Passion of Saint Tibulus at the Craggy Island theatre: the film, condemned as blasphemous, is banned by His Holiness from playing everywhere in the entire world, but it is being shown on Craggy Island due to an odd loophole. Brennan wants the Fathers to show the Catholic Church has made a stand on it; he considers this matter of utmost importance as he had to be recalled from his holiday in California.

Ted and Dougal go to the cinema to find only a couple of people there, one of whom swiftly leaves after being told by Michael, the manager that the film is subtitled; she prefers dubs instead. The priests make a gentlemen's agreement with Michael to watch the film once and then peacefully protest at it so that Michael can throw them out, making it look like a fuss. They return to the parochial house for the night and discuss the film, agreeing it was difficult to understand and sexually explicit.

The next morning, Bishop Brennan returns to the parochial house, forcefully crashing through the front door. He forces Ted and Dougal to start their protest early that day, despite the cinema not yet being open. They half-heartedly stand outside the cinema, waving placards and proclaiming, "Down with this sort of thing" (Ted) and "Careful now" (Dougal). Ted instructs Dougal to buy handcuffs so they can chain themselves to the railings outside the cinema, hoping it will increase attention. However, they find their protests have the opposite effect and people are drawn in to see the film.

Meanwhile, Bishop Brennan comes into the parochial house in search of his travel bag and asks Jack why he is not with the other priests for the protest (to which Jack responds, to Bishop Brennan's anger, by shouting "Feck off!"). The bishop then asks if he has seen his travel bag, asking Jack to bring it back if he finds it. After Bishop Brennan leaves, Jack takes the bag out of hiding and looks inside it. Among what he finds are the bishop’s passport (which he throws away), a VHS camcorder containing a "Holiday '95 California" video cassette, which Jack takes from the camcorder and puts in his jacket, and a bottle of Jack Daniel's whiskey, which he gleefully takes.

As evening comes, Michael tells Ted The Passion of Saint Tibulus has been more successful for him than even Jurassic Park. Ted, by now fed up, decides to give up his protest and asks Dougal to hand him the handcuff keys so he can release himself. He finds that Dougal does not have any keys, and as the pair have to remain handcuffed to the railing until a method of freeing themselves comes, they are forced to carry it home with them.

Back at the house, Bishop Brennan scolds the priests for causing the film to become so popular that people are arriving from all over Ireland and "even from Gdańsk" to see it, indicating that people from across the world are coming to see it. He then shows them a globe and explains his plans to reassign them all to locations worse than Craggy Island as punishment. Noticing Father Jack not paying attention, he ignores Ted's warning not to wake him ("Bishop, I wouldn't do that") - and as a result Jack punches him in the face. After the bishop departs, Ted and Dougal lament their fate, but Jack shows them the video cassette which contains film of the bishop in California with his secret mistress and his son. Ted realises he can use this tape for blackmail and to force the bishop to change his mind. The priests gleefully decide to watch the tape a few more times.

== Production ==
The episode's central theme is ineffectual protest. The plot of the Church's opposition to a blasphemous film was inspired by the reaction to several real-life films, including The Last Temptation of Christ, Sebastiane, Hail Mary and Monty Python's Life of Brian; the last of these was banned in Ireland upon its release so Linehan joined a film club specifically to get a chance to watch it.

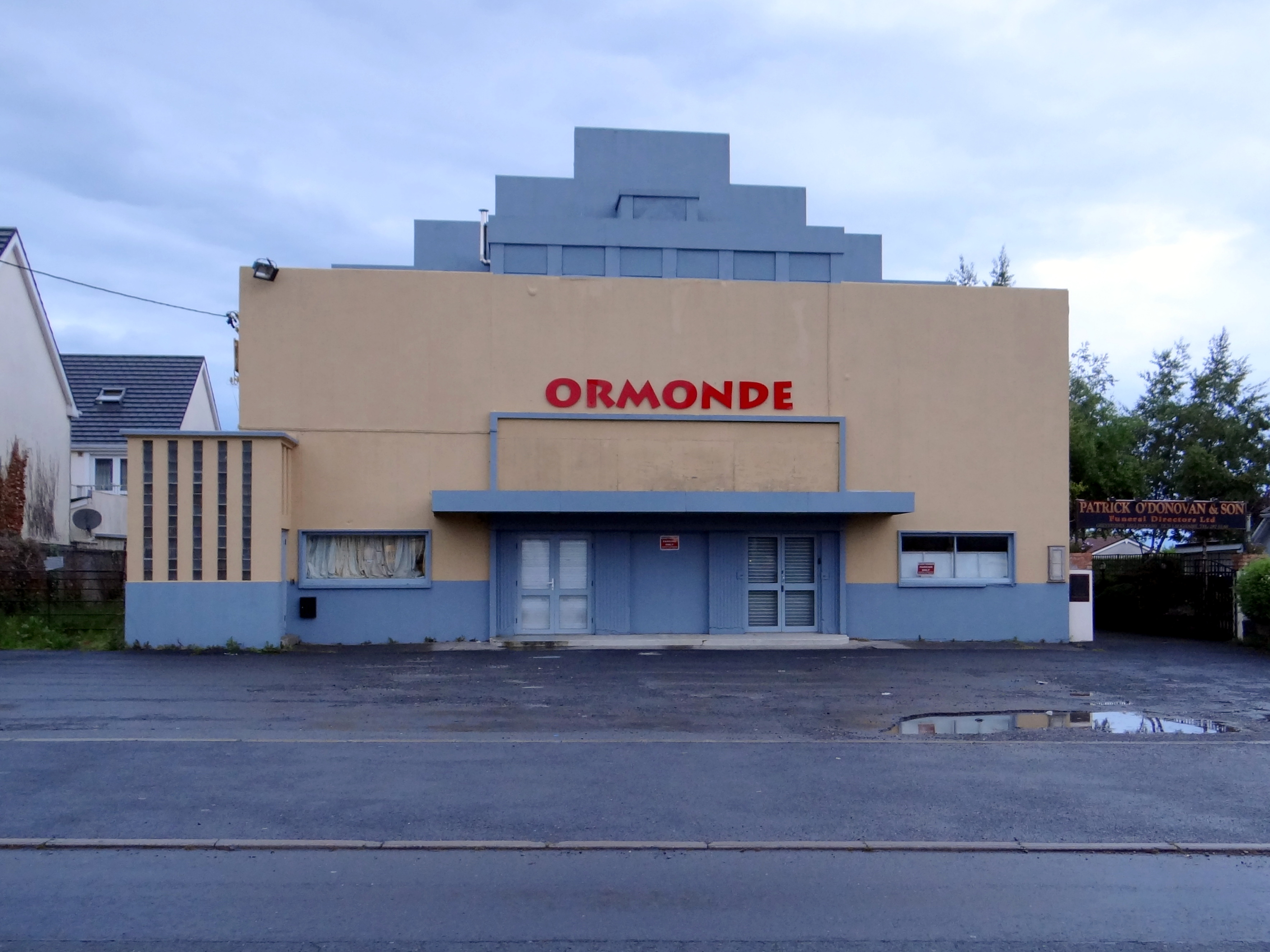
The Ormonde in Greystones, in 2014

This episode was the second to be recorded, and the writers originally planned to air it first before they later moved it to second, feeling that "Good Luck, Father Ted" would make a better introduction, and finally to third because of Mathews' particular love for "Entertaining Father Stone" - this causes a continuity error, as the VCR that Father Hernandez gives to the Craggy Island Parochial House Fathers is already present in "Entertaining Father Stone". The cinema used was the Ormonde in Greystones, County Wicklow (which continued to operate until July 2007, when it closed due to commercial difficulties).

One of the writers' early ideas for the series was that every priest in the world knows every other priest personally; this idea is introduced in the opening scene, with Cuba's Father Hernandez. When Hernandez speaks in Spanish, he is clumsily dubbed over by an English translator, which the Craggy Islanders can inexplicably hear and understand – an idea Linehan considered "just this side of being too mad to do". The translator's voice is provided by producer Geoffrey Perkins.

This episode introduced the recurring character of Bishop Brennan, who was initially based on Eamon Casey and later on Michael Cleary. The writers cast Jim Norton after seeing him as Wentworth in the 1995 Frasier episode "The Club"; Mathews had also heard his reading of James Joyce's Ulysses. The writers always felt that Bishop Brennan was Father Jack's nemesis, as Jack himself had the potential to become a bishop, but failed to do so because he was not a career priest.

The scenes with Ted and Dougal sharing a bedroom were inspired by similar scenes in the Morecambe and Wise shows. The writers used these scenes for end-of-the-day conversations to wrap up the story, and to provide a sort of "safe zone" for Ted and Dougal to discuss the plot. Linehan and Mathews had to cut laughs in some scenes because the studio audience incorrectly thought they were making sex jokes.

== Legacy ==
=== Protest signs ===
The vague protest signs carried by Ted and Dougal are among the show's most-recognised jokes – this is acknowledged in the closing montage of the final episode, where the slogans are the only soundbite used.

The line is referenced in the 2009 27th issue of the Garth Ennis superhero comic series The Boys, in which Irish bartender (and former vampire, of Ennis' Preacher) Proinsias Cassidy wears a black form-fitting t-shirt with "Careful Now" inscribed in red text across the left chest.

The signs were referred to by Green Party leader John Gormley on 28 June 2010 to describe his view that the Labour Party had few or no policies. He accused the Labour Party of saying "Down with this sort of thing" without providing their alternative.

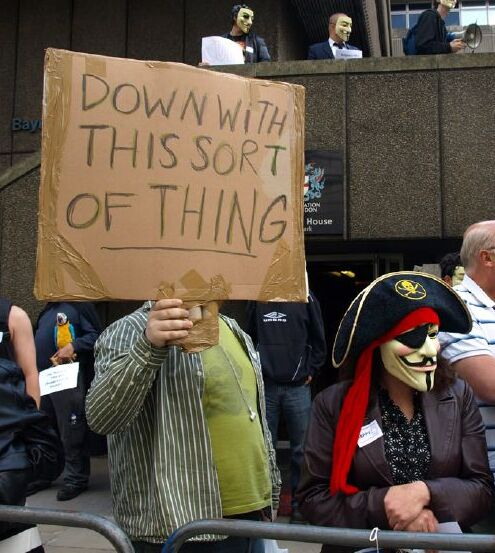
Protest sign in London, 2008

During a number of high-profile UK protests, including throughout the Pope's state visit in September 2010 and student protests against tuition fee rises in November 2010, as well as protests against the Irish EU bailout and austerity measures in November 2010, several protesters displayed banners saying, "Down with this sort of thing" and "Careful now".

The line is referenced in the 2013 video game Grand Theft Auto V, where a protester is seen carrying a "Down with this sort of thing" sign.

=== Fan film ===
A black-and-white silent short film, Saint Tibulus & The Bog Water, was shot on 1 March 2014 at the eighth annual Ted Fest event in the Aran Islands - a professional camera crew and actors took part in the production, which featured fans as minor characters and extras.

The film is set at a young couple's wedding on Craggy Island in 1740. A ship bringing alcohol for the wedding loses its cargo in a storm - the attendees are devastated. Saint Tibulus appears and miraculously transforms a pot of bog water to a new alcoholic drink (Known as "The Saint's Brew" until 1759 when Arthur, a young man who witnessed the miracle, recreates it to sell the drink as his own) saving the wedding.
