= Good Luck, Father Ted =

- Father Ted episode
- Jack and Dougal ride the Whirly-go-round
- Episode no.: Series 1 Episode 1
- Directed by: Declan Lowney
- Written by: Graham Linehan; Arthur Mathews
- Original air date: 21 April 1995

Guest appearances
- Gerard Lee as Terry Macnamee; Pat Shortt as Tom

Episode chronology
← Previous —	Next → "Entertaining Father Stone"

"Good Luck, Father Ted" is the first episode to be aired of the Channel 4 sitcom Father Ted. It first aired in the United Kingdom & Republic of Ireland on 21 April 1995.

== Synopsis ==
Ted is contacted by a producer from Tele Éireann television programme, Faith of our Fathers, requesting to interview Ted as a priest who works in a remote area. Ted is elated to be asked, but as he fears that his fellow priests Dougal and Jack would embarrass him, he tells the producer that he is the only priest on Craggy Island, and arranges to meet the television reporter at "The Field", one of the least-rocky areas on the island.

As the day of the interview arrives, Dougal is excited about attending "Funland", a funfair that has been set up on "The Field". Ted tells Dougal to take Jack in his wheelchair for a walk along the cliffs while he goes to meet the reporter at the fair; however, Dougal and Jack soon appear at the fair, Dougal claiming that the cliffs were "closed" and "gone" due to erosion as an excuse to attend the fair. Ted, who has yet to meet the reporter, unsuccessfully tries to usher Dougal and Jack away. Jack soon takes off on his own while Dougal is distracted, and Ted is forced to look for him, finding him asleep on a park bench. Ted sits down with him, but is too late as he discovers that the bench is part of the "Crane of Death" ride, and is lifted high into the air. From his vantage point, Ted sees that Dougal has been found by the television reporter, and since Ted said he was the only priest on the island, the reporter mistakes Dougal for Ted. In his lament, Ted falls off the bench to the ground.

Later, a heavily bandaged Ted watches the television interview along with Dougal, Jack and Mrs Doyle at the parochial house. Ted cringes as, during the interview, Dougal talks about his doubts about Christianity and organised religion, while the on-screen caption reads "Father Ted Crilly". Jack sees Dougal on the TV set and angrily hurls a whiskey bottle at it, something he had already done earlier in the episode.

== Production ==
While this was the first Father Ted episode broadcast, it was not always intended to be; the writers originally planned to air "The Passion of Saint Tibulus" first, but later decided that "'Good Luck, Father Ted'" would make a better introduction. Linehan makes a non-speaking cameo appearance, goading the "fierce man" on the stepladder at Funland. Mathews also makes a cameo as the voice on the Funland intercom; the voice Mathews adopts here is the one he used while playing "Father Ted" in a stand-up routine he performed prior to the series's creation.
