= Entertaining Father Stone =

- Father Ted episode
- Ted in bath (foreground) as Father Stone uses the toilet (background)
- Episode no.: Series 1 Episode 2
- Directed by: Declan Lowney
- Written by: Graham Linehan; Arthur Mathews
- Original air date: 28 April 1995

Guest appearance
- Michael Redmond as Father Paul Stone

Episode chronology
← Previous "Good Luck, Father Ted"	Next → "The Passion of Saint Tibulus"

"Entertaining Father Stone" is the second episode of Channel 4 sitcom Father Ted.

Arthur Mathews introduces this episode by stating that the idea for Father Stone came from a 'friend' of a friend who stayed with the friend for his holidays and used to cheat at golf. This person had the ability to dominate and ruin the atmosphere of a room.

== Synopsis ==
Ted announces to a horrified Dougal that Father Paul Stone (Michael Redmond) has come for his holidays. For the preceding six years, Father Stone has visited the parochial house; he is pathologically boring and is totally unable to hold a conversation, giving one-sentence answers at the most and dominating the room with his awkward protracted silences. To try to stop him from coming, Ted told Father Stone incredible lies, but this failed to deter him.

Even when Father Stone arrives, Ted and Dougal make excuses to have him leave the house, but Stone offers to stay regardless of the conditions. After Father Stone stays through Ted's birthday party three weeks later, making it an awkward time for all the guests, Ted prays to God to get rid of Stone anyway he can. The next day, Ted and Dougal go to the Crazy Golf Course in the middle of a thunderstorm, thinking this is better than hanging around Father Stone. However, Father Stone has followed them there. Ted suggests that Father Stone should try a go at golf; as he raises the club, Father Stone is struck by lightning.

At the local hospital, Father Stone is found to be in shock: standing up, still holding the golf club, and not responding to any stimulus. Father Stone's parents and maternal grandmother arrive. His grandmother privately warns Ted that she knows what he is up to, while his mother goes on about how much Father Stone looked forward to his visits at Craggy Island, showing a picture of Ted and Father Stone that he drew. Ted feels very guilty about having prayed for Father Stone to leave, and scared that the grandmother seems to know what he did. Ted begins praying at Father Stone's bedside, saying that Paul can stay for as long as he wants, that he will look after him "for the rest of his days". After a brief interval, Father Stone regains consciousness, and is his old self again, giving one-word answers. Finally, Father Stone, as promised, has been allowed to stay on Craggy Island. A faint smile breaks across his face.

== Production ==
The episode's title is a play on the name of the play Entertaining Mr Sloane by playwright Joe Orton. The picture Father Stone paints of himself and Ted can be seen on the wall, in the living room, in later episodes. There is a slight continuity error in this episode, the JVC video recorder which was given to Ted and Dougal as a gift in the following episode can be seen on top of the television.

Mathews makes a cameo appearance as a guest at Ted's birthday party. This episode is Mathews's favourite, and was given the prominent position of airing as the series' second episode for this reason. The character of Father Stone is based on a man who repeatedly invited himself to visit two of Mathews' friends; according to Mathews, the visitor was eager to see the couple, but never made any attempt to be good company.

Linehan and Mathews clashed with the art department on this episode: the writers wanted the show's hospitals and police stations modern, to contrast with Craggy Island's environs, but they ended up looking similarly rural and beaten-down.

Kate Binchy, the actress who played Father Stone's mother, became ill shortly before filming was due to begin. The production had insufficient time to find a replacement, and resorted to casting Pauline McLynn in the role. McLynn was prepared to play the part, and was in full make-up and costume on the day of filming; however, Binchy recovered at the last minute and was able to take the role. The writers later noted that they would have "gotten away with it" since Mrs Doyle had hardly been shown at this point in the series, but that it would have been the "oddest thing in the world" on repeated viewings.
