= Craggy Island =

Fictional Irish island from the Father Ted sitcom

- 'Father Ted' location
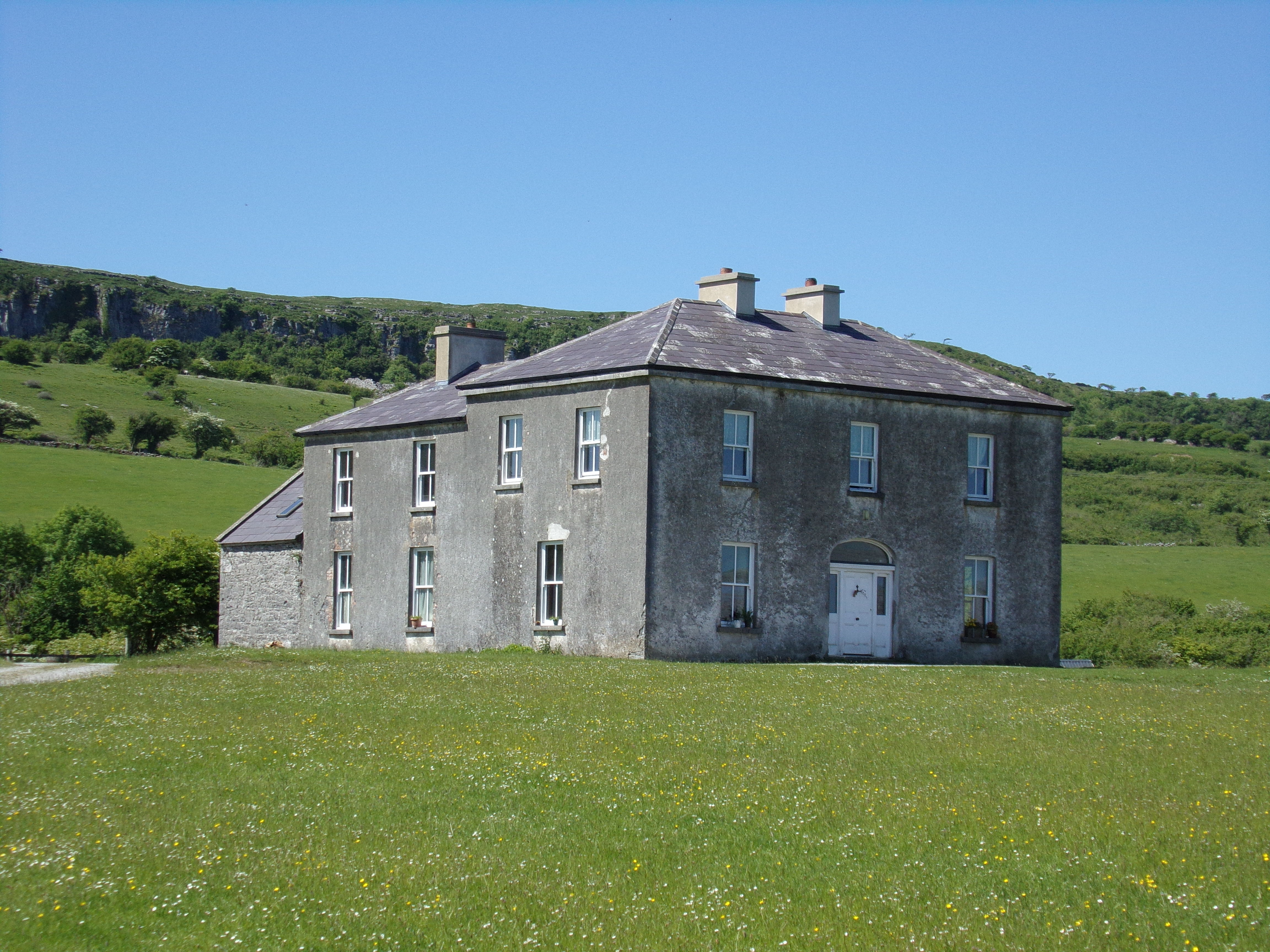
- Glenquin House in County Clare features as Craggy Island Parochial House
- First appearance: "Good Luck, Father Ted" (1995)
- Last appearance: "Going to America" (1998)
- Created by: Graham Linehan; Arthur Mathews
- Genre: Television sitcom

In-universe information
- Type: Island
- Location: West coast of Ireland
- Characters: Father Ted Crilly; Father Dougal McGuire; Father Jack Hackett; Mrs. Doyle

Craggy Island is a fictional island, supposedly off the west coast of Ireland, which serves as the primary setting for the Channel 4 sitcom Father Ted. An isolated, desolate and undesirable place, it is home to three Catholic priests: Father Ted Crilly, Father Dougal McGuire and Father Jack Hackett alongside their housekeeper Mrs Doyle; all of whom reside in the island's Parochial House and have been "banished" to the island for various reasons.

== Development ==
County Clare, in the province of Munster, Ireland, was chosen as the primary filming location for Father Ted in 1993. Location manager Joe Mardis was at a pub in the village of Kilfenora when he realised that the exposed karst landscapes of northern County Clare, such as the Burren, could easily be portrayed as an island. Mardis looked at a number of older houses in Clare, photographed them and brought them for writers Graham Linehan and Arthur Mathews. Glenquin House was chosen for the exterior shots of the parochial house.

== Information ==
Craggy Island is a remote and desolate place, supposedly located off the west coast of Ireland. The island is inhabited by Irish locals, a Chinese community and a sole Māori man. The island's weather is often bleak and harsh storms are very common. The landscape consists of mainly rocky cliffs and grass fields, and many stone walls and fences divide the island.

The island's buildings are very old and run down. There is a one-way road connecting the whole island, but the roads can be "taken in" in bad weather and there are few vehicles regardless. There is a church and parochial house, the latter in which the three priests and Mrs Doyle live. In terms of shops and establishments, the island features a picnic area, a cinema, an internet café, an isolation tank, a post office, a greyhound racing track, a very small golf course and a pub. There is also a Chinatown and a few large buildings in the town centre. There used to be a west part of Craggy Island but it "broke off during a storm".

== Locations ==
=== Craggy Island Parochial House ===
The parochial house is a Victorian style period property, and the main location for the series, situated in isolation on Craggy Island. The three priests ended up there as punishments for different reasons.

=== Points of interest ===
- The Field - ''Good Luck, Father Ted''
- Holy Stone of Clonrichert - ''Tentacles of Doom''

=== Neighbouring island ===
Rugged Island is the home of Father Dick Byrne, Father Cyril MacDuff and Father Jim Johnson. The three inhabitant priests are warped versions of Ted, Dougal and Jack, and the two islands are constantly competing against each other.

== "The real Craggy Island" ==
A dispute between the three constituent Aran Islands in Galway Bay, off the west coast of Ireland, began in early 2007. Inishmore, Inishmaan and Inisheer engaged in a battle, aiming to be labelled as 'the real Craggy Island'. The battle for tourist revenues and a quest for authenticity has been pursued by fans through Father Ted film clips since. A three-day Father Ted festival, staged on Inishmore, prompted inhabitants of the island to claim kinship with the genuine Craggy Island. The event, known as Ted Fest, or The Friends of Father Ted Festival, has since taken place on the island every year, and events include Priest’s Dance Off, The Lovely Girls competition and Ted’s Got Talent.
