= Patrick McDonnell (actor) =

Irish actor and comedian

- Born: Dromiskin, County Louth, Ireland
- Occupations: Comedian, actor
- Years active: 1994–present

Patrick McDonnell is an Irish actor and comedian. He has starred in the RTÉ hidden camera comedy show Naked Camera and the sketch show Stew. However he is probably best remembered at home and abroad for his role as Eoin McLove in the Channel 4 sitcom Father Ted.

McDonnell is a native of Dromiskin, County Louth. He studied in Dundalk CBS and St Patrick's College, Maynooth, and holds a master's degree in Irish history.

He has played various roles in hit Irish comedy show The Savage Eye, which is written and also co-stars David McSavage. He also is the co-host of the podcast "Talking Ted", from the HeadStuff Podcast Network.

== Career ==
- Stephanie Knows Who (1994) (Short)
- Father Ted (TV series) (1998)
- Don't Feed the Gondolas (TV series)
- Separation Anxiety (2002)
- Stew (TV series) (Various roles) (2004)
- Naked Camera (TV series) (Producer) (2005–2007)
- Comedy Showcase (TV series) (2007)
- The Savage Eye (Various roles) (2009–present)
- Val Falvey TD (TV series) (2009)
- Small, Far Away: The World of Father Ted (TV documentary) (2011)
- Moone Boy
- The Young Offenders (1 episode) (Guard) (2020)
