= Michael Redmond (comedian) =

Irish comedian

Michael Redmond (born October 1950) is an Irish stand-up comedian from Blackrock, Dublin. He has a deadpan style of delivery and has been described as the "possessor of comedy's most mournful moustache". He is best known for playing Father Stone in the Father Ted episode "Entertaining Father Stone".

Redmond began his career as a writer for Irish radio and television, before moving to London and launching a successful stand-up career in 1987. Lauded by Stewart Lee for having the best opening line in stand-up comedy, "People often say to me: hey you, what are you doing in my garden?" His live show Eamon, Older Brother of Jesus was adapted for a BBC Radio 4 series, but scrapped on the decision of the station's new Scottish Catholic controller. Parts of the series were subsequently broadcast on Alan Davies' BBC Radio 1 show. After his work on Father Ted, he continued to appear in projects as diverse as Brass Eye, and Stewart Lee's Comedy Vehicle, and is a regular participant at the Edinburgh Fringe Festival. Redmond played another priest in the film Voodoophone.

He also plays Bishop Briggs in Radio 4's Fags, Mags and Bags.

In 2026, Redmond can be seen playing the part of Garda Peadar in Lisa McGee’s latest show, 'How to get to Heaven from Belfast', showing on Netflix.
