= Father Dougal McGuire =

Character in the Channel 4 sitcom Father Ted

- Father Ted character
- Ardal O'Hanlon as Father Dougal
- First appearance: "Good Luck, Father Ted" (1995)
- Last appearance: "Fundraising with Father Dougal" (2001; advert)
- Created by: Arthur Mathews; Graham Linehan
- Portrayed by: Ardal O'Hanlon

In-universe information
- Occupation: Curate; Milkman (briefly)
- Religion: Roman Catholic
- Home: Craggy Island Parochial House, Craggy Island, County Clare, Ireland
- Nationality: Irish

Father Dougal McGuire is a character in the Channel 4 sitcom Father Ted. Created by Arthur Mathews and Graham Linehan, Dougal was portrayed by comedian Ardal O'Hanlon for the programme's three series. The character is a childlike, simple-minded Roman Catholic curate exiled to Craggy Island, a small island off the coast of Galway.

Dougal originated as an unseen character in a short-lived stand-up routine performed by Mathews in the late 1980s. Portraying an early version of Father Ted Crilly on-stage, Mathews occasionally discussed Dougal as one of Ted's great friends. In 1994, the writers took Father Ted to television, casting O'Hanlon as the on-screen Dougal. In a 2001 poll conducted by Channel 4, Dougal was ranked fifth on their list of the 100 Greatest TV Characters.

== Concept and creation ==
Arthur Mathews created the character of Father Ted while working at Hot Press in 1987–89. During production weekends, he and Paul Woodfull had the idea for The Joshua Trio, a comedic U2 tribute band. The band performed various warm-up sketches written by Mathews, Woodfull, and Graham Linehan, who joined in a non-musical capacity. These sketches included stand-up performed by Mathews in-character as Father Ted Crilly. As Ted, Mathews sometimes read from a book, Notes from Africa, purportedly written by Father Dougal McGuire, a missionary friend who described his experiences of being attacked and chased by natives. In one sketch, Ted discussed his concern for Dougal, who had been voted Most Unpopular Priest in Africa for two years running and was spending Christmas up a tree in the grounds of The Bob Geldof Centre.

In 1990, Linehan and Mathews began writing Irish Lives, a six-part comedy television series. The show would have taken the form of a mockumentary, with each episode focusing on interviewing a different character, one of whom was Father Ted Crilly. The story involved Ted returning to his seminary to catch up with old friends. When producer Geoffrey Perkins asked Linehan and Mathews to discard the mockumentary format and expand the Father Ted episode to a traditional sitcom, Father Dougal became one of the main characters. When writing Dougal, Linehan and Mathews drew on Stan Laurel, incorporating some of Linehan's own behaviour during moments of confusion.

== Casting ==
Linehan and Mathews saw O'Hanlon in a modernised Shakespeare play broadcast by RTÉ, and were impressed by the "weird, gormless" face he could pull. Linehan later said, "That was Dougal right there. He was just spot-on and he became our secret weapon. The show took off so quickly because Ardal was so instantly funny." The writers have said that the only other actor they feel might have worked in the role is Don Wycherley, who plays Dougal's Rugged Island counterpart, Father Cyril McDuff, in the show.

There have been several attempts to remake the show for American audiences. In 2004, it was reported that Graham Norton (who played Father Noel Furlong in Father Ted) had signed on to play Dougal alongside Steve Martin as Ted.

== Fictional character biography ==
References to Dougal's family are rare. In "Grant Unto Him Eternal Rest", he mentions that his parents are dead, and also refers to an uncle who died after his heart stopped beating for a week. It is unclear how Dougal entered the priesthood, with Ted wondering, "Dougal, how did you get into the Church? Was it, like, collect twelve crisp packets and become a priest?"

Dougal is dim-witted and childlike. In "Chirpy Burpy Cheap Sheep", it is revealed that Ted has made him write a list of things that do not exist, which is on a pull-down chart in their bedroom. Often he says things that Ted specifically told him not to say, such as by asking about Bishop Brennan's son, as well as shouting to Ted to ask if the Bishop found a large number of rabbits that they are hiding in the parochial house (fortunately for Ted, the bishop was more concerned about Dougal addressing him by his first name instead of using his proper title). In "The Mainland", he forgets to have any breakfast and fails to realise this until he and Ted are waiting for Father Jack at the optician. He also nearly gives a visiting bishop a heart attack when he screams in excitement after remembering the director's cut of Aliens is airing on television that night.

Sometimes he talks more sense, however, such as when Ted inadvertently winds up his unravelled jumper upon discovering that it could provide a way out, and he asks what use it will be when all wound up. In "Kicking Bishop Brennan Up the Arse", he suggests that Ted use his fear of Bishop Brennan to his advantage to carry out the forfeit he was assigned by his rival, and to get Bishop Brennan into position, draws a crude watercolour painting on the skirting board, depicting a man wearing a bishop's hat.

By the time the show begins, Dougal has been exiled to Craggy Island as punishment for unknown misdeeds. In an early interview, the writers stated that it involved "a baptism gone wrong". In "The Passion of Saint Tibulus", Bishop Brennan says that Dougal cannot be allowed back into "the real world" after "the Blackrock incident", in which hundreds of nuns' lives were "irreparably damaged".

In "A Christmassy Ted", Dougal performs a funeral that Ted was meant to do, but forgot about. Ted is alarmed to learn from Mrs Doyle that Dougal is performing a funeral, and the consequences of Dougal performing the funeral are predictably disastrous.

Bishop Brennan despises Dougal, at one point referring to him as a "cabbage". He also does not take kindly to Dougal calling him "Len", often shouting profanity at him when he does.

Dougal is famously known for wearing an Irish football jersey when he is in bed. He and Ted share a bedroom, but owing to his childlike nature Dougal does not sleep with a normal blanket like Ted; instead he sleeps with a child's cartoon character bedspread (specifically Masters of the Universe).

On the Channel 4 website for Father Ted, the profile for Father Dougal states that 'Dougal was relegated to the island after an unfortunate incident on a SeaLink ferry that put the lives of hundreds of nuns in danger.'

In "Old Grey Whistle Theft", Dougal mentions that he is 25 years old (soon to be 26).

== Personality ==
In the 2011 documentary Unintelligent Design, Linehan said that Dougal had been conceived as a cross between wide-eyed bartender Woody in Cheers and roadsweeper Trigger in Only Fools and Horses. In another interview, they mentioned Latka Gravas from Taxi as an influence and compared the relationship between Ted and Dougal to that between Don Quixote and Sancho Panza: "Alongside the wily priest who would lie at the drop of a hat we wanted a gormless idiot who was the very model of innocence."

For his portrayal of Dougal, O'Hanlon turned to Laurel and Hardy and Fawlty Towers's bumbling waiter Manuel. O'Hanlon also drew inspiration from his child sister, as well as dogs, explaining: "Dougal had to be more than just stupid. He had to be otherworldly and very, very strange. I saw Dougal as very doglike, very puppyish and lovable, and really loyal to Ted."

== Reception and legacy ==
After the first episode aired, Ben Thompson of The Independent singled out O'Hanlon as "the real star of the show", and said that Dougal's "holy-fool innocence" as "worthy of James Stewart". Writing for the Irish Examiner, Ed Power said that while the "meme-worthy" Dougal and Jack received the most attention at the time of broadcast, Dermot Morgan's straight-man performance was the highlight in retrospect. Morgan attributed the show's success to the appealing double-act formed by Dougal, "an idiot who knows nothing", and Ted, "an idiot who thinks he knows something but actually knows nothing."

As testament to the character's enduring popularity, Irish bookmakers humorously began collecting bets on whether Dougal would succeed Pope John Paul II upon his death. The odds were 1,000-1 (better odds than some genuine candidates), and some small stakes were actually received.

In 2001, O'Hanlon reprised the role of Dougal for a series of PBS advertisements to coincide with Father Ted's American broadcast; these segments were included on later DVD releases as "Fundraising with Father Dougal".
