= The Pope's Children =

Book by David McWilliams

- Author: David McWilliams
- Language: English
- Genre: Commentary, Society, Politics
- Publisher: Gill & Macmillan
- Publication date: October 2005
- Publication place: Ireland
- Media type: Print (Hardback & Paperback)
- Pages: 281 pp (Hardback edition)
- ISBN: 0-7171-3971-9
- OCLC: 62310612
- Dewey Decimal: 305.23509417 22
- LC Class: HQ799.8.I73 M38 2005

The Pope's Children: Ireland's New Elite is a 2005 book by Irish journalist and economist David McWilliams.

In his book McWilliams describes the effects that the Celtic Tiger and the property boom have had on Ireland, resulting in the rise of a new bourgeoisie.

== Background ==
During the late 1990s, McWilliams, while working in various financial houses in London, had established a reputation as a pessimistic commentator on the Irish economy, predicting that a harsh recession would soon arrive. Diversifications in Irish broadcasting in the early Celtic Tiger, such as the introduction of Newstalk and TV3, created opportunities for new voices in current affairs and McWilliams presented short-lived shows on both stations. By 2005, the Celtic Tiger had continued to outlive his prediction of its demise and new pundits (like George Lee, Morgan Kelly, and Eddie Hobbs) were emerging to criticise aspects of the Irish economy.

McWilliams needed a new angle to present his theories about the Irish economy and turned to America for inspiration. Conservative pundit David Brooks had found success with his book Bobos in Paradise in which changes in the American economy in the 1990s were explained using nicknames and stock characters to personify economic actors. "Bobo" was a term Brooks used disparagingly for people who saw themselves as "bohemian" but also bourgeoisie. McWilliams would later cite Brooks as an influence and coin several neologisms along this line.

== The Text ==
The book's title reflects McWilliams' belief that Pope John Paul II's visit to Ireland in the autumn of 1979 was a watershed in the country's history. The children born during that period (who at the time of publication are between the ages of 25 and 35) are "The Pope's Children" – the first generation since the Great Famine of the mid-19th century to experience an increase in the size of the population. (The rise in birth rates in Ireland began in the early 1970s and peaked in June 1980, exactly nine months after the pope's visit.) According to McWilliams, these 620,000 people became the country's key generation. They are the dynamo of Ireland's economy, politics and culture, and they will shape its face in the 21st century.

The significance of generations (and economic rivalry between generations) is something McWilliams would revisit in later books, and the idea that Ireland's singular 20th century history meant that it had different generational delineations than other countries (like boomer, Gen X or millennial) is something that would catch on.

In the book, McWilliams introduced terms such as "Breakfast Roll Man", "Deckland", "Kells Angels" (people commuting to Dublin from neighbouring counties) and "HiCo" (Hiberno Cosmopolitans) to explain the economic phenomena of the Celtic Tiger.

In November 2006 RTÉ broadcast a three-part documentary series In Search of the Pope's Children based upon the book and presented by McWilliams.

== Impact and legacy ==
'The Pope's Children" was a huge commercial success in Ireland, selling over a hundred thousand copies. The success of the work led to the publication of further works by McWilliams, such as The Generation Game' and 'Following the Money', each of which continue with some of the same characters and topics. In 2010 the book was shortlisted as one of the Irish books of the decade.

The phrase "Breakfast Roll Man" entered common parlance to the point that a novelty song, Jumbo Breakfast Roll achieved popular success in 2006.

== Criticism ==
The use of labels such as HiCo and Breakfast Roll man by McWilliams has been criticised as glib and even snobbish by some commentators. The book's description of Gaelscoileanna as aspirational, middle-class and even elitist has been criticised as being based on a narrow sample within Dublin 4 and not an accurate reflection of the movement for Irish-medium education nationally.
