= In Search of the Pope's Children =

Irish television programme

- Country of origin: Republic of Ireland
- Original language: English
- No. of episodes: 3

Production
- Running time: 60 minutes

Original release
- Network: Raidió Teilifís Éireann
- Release: 6 November – 20 November 2006

In Search of the Pope's Children is an Irish television programme based on the book The Pope's Children, aired by the state broadcaster RTÉ and British broadcaster BBC Four. The programme is a three-part true lives documentary, presented by economist David McWilliams. The show comments on the Irish economy and the social attitudes surrounding it. The show is marketed as being sharp, witty and argumentative.

McWilliams is credited with being the first economist to predict the 1990s boom in Ireland's economy and he is arguably most famous for his predictions of an Irish property price collapse between 1997 and 2002.

== Episode one ==
McWilliams claims that the visit of Pope John Paul II to Ireland in 1979 coincided with a baby boom which peaked nine months after the visit. These children were born early in 1980, coinciding with the biggest growth of the Irish population since before The Great Famine, 135 years before. He calls these people "the Pope's Children".

In the first episode McWilliams "catches up" with the Pope's Children to see how their lives are going, finding out how much they earn, what their spending habits are, as well as how long they work and spend commuting.

== Episode two ==
The second episode of the series focuses on the property market in Ireland. McWilliams looks at apartments in Dublin city centre selling for over €1 million, talks to people who live in County Meath – part of Dublin's vast commuter belt – and also to those who have bought derelict cottages in the west of Ireland.

McWilliams also follows a group of Irish people to Bulgaria where many of them are buying soon-to-be-built apartments. He meets a Scottish man living in Bulgaria who is very concerned that rental incomes from the properties will be much lower than the buyers expect.

McWilliams asserts that, like many other countries in the past, Ireland is progressing through a well-known seven-stage cycle (first described by Charles P. Kindleberger) in the property market. He claims that the market is at the stage immediately preceding a price crash, and that it is inevitable that the Irish property bubble will burst.

== Episode three ==
McWilliams finished off the mini-series be stressing the issue of how heavily dependent Ireland's economy is on trade. It also discussed how Ireland has gone from being a country with too many people and not enough money to a country of not enough people and too much credit.

According to McWilliams Ireland's physical resources are dominating by the property industry, which forces most foreign investment into intellectually orientated industries. He claims that Ireland has been very lucky in the past; having strong ties to both other European countries and the United States. He then made the claim that 87% of Ireland's exports generated by multinational companies such as Microsoft, Apple Computer, Dell, Intel, and Google, implying that decisions made in New York boardrooms have a far greater effect on the Irish economy than decisions made in the Dáil.

The traditional plan for the future of the Irish economy is to become more and more merged with other European economies and form a single European economy. But McWilliams believes that Ireland has finished benefiting from EU membership. He predicts that Ireland might get a poor deal out of a future European economy, as the interest rates will probably rise dramatically. McWilliams suggested an alternative to the traditional plan he suggests that we should become less connected with the EU and perhaps create stronger links to China and other economies likely to overtake the Europe in the future.
