= Killinaskully =

Television series

- Created by: Pat Shortt
- Starring: Pat Shortt; Jack Walsh; Joe Rooney; Páraic Breathnach; Pascal Scott; Louis Lovett; John Keogh; Mary Harvey; Jim Queally; Maria McDermottroe; Aoife Molony; Gerry Walsh; Cian Smith
- Country of origin: Ireland
- Original language: English
- No. of episodes: 36 (list of episodes)

Production
- Running time: 26 minutes (per episode)

Original release
- Network: RTÉ One
- Release: 26 September 2004 – 26 December 2008

'She's overhaetin' like a randy badger!'

— ^{Dan in Series V: Episode III.}

Killinaskully is an Irish television comedy series which details the bizarre goings-on in a fictitious Irish village called Killinaskully located in the hills of Ireland. It was actually filmed on location in the villages of Killoscully and Ballinahinch near Birdhill in County Tipperary, the title being a fusion of these two placenames. The show's humour comes from the unusual characterisations of traditional, stereotypical rural Irish folk. The show was chiefly written by the comedian, Pat Shortt, who also performed many of his own roles – starring among him were Jack Walsh, Joe Rooney and Páraic Breathnach. It has spawned its own themed holiday in farm accommodation in the Slieve Felim Mountain range region, within walking distance of the village used for filming the series. In an allusion to the popular song released by Pat Shortt, visitors are given a complimentary "Jumbo Breakfast Roll" upon their arrival.

Killinaskully was produced by Shortt's own company and was broadcast by RTÉ as part of their Sunday night schedule from 2004. All five series are available on DVD and have since been released in box set format. The show's fifth and final series, began transmission on 28 September 2008. It ceased on 2 November 2008, although the traditional special at Christmas time aired as normal the following month; in 2008 there were two such specials. Despite having a weekly audience of 800,000, Shortt has stated that the fifth was the final series as he wished to concentrate on the development of a new show with a new style, characters and storyline. RTÉ continued to rerun the series as summer filler.

== Background ==
"Theme music"
From Killinaskully

Filming locations

Shortt wanted to do a show that would make use of his acting skills and comic talent and this led to him transferring some of his stage show on the screen in the form of Killinaskully; it is this that leads him to play all the different characters that he does in the show. Shooting for the first series commenced in May 2003 in Limerick and Tipperary, continuing for a period of eight weeks. The pilot episode, entitled "The German Fillum', was broadcast during the Christmas period of 2003 and proved to be a massive ratings success. The first episode was broadcast on Sunday 17 October 2004 at 22:50.

The intro sequence of Killinaskully features Dan driving back home to Killinaskully.

== Setting ==
Killinaskully, in keeping with the comic element of the show, has a fluctuating population; in the first episode it is said to consist of 167 inhabitants but in the second episode it is said to have a population of over 2,000 people. The village is located 117 km (73 mi) from the sea. The nearest town is neighbouring Bally, a mere 134 km (83 mi) from the coast. Bally is first alluded to in the fifth episode, entitled "The Pitch". The rural setting allows for greater comic effect in the introduction of such ideas as a community radio station to the show. The series is largely set around the buildings that Killinaskully is composed of, i.e. the church, school, garda station, public house and a house that is used for the exterior of Goretti's Bed and Breakfast in the show. Dan and Bridie's cottage is located outside the village.. The show's humour draws from the archetypes of rural Ireland, the characters themselves are based on these archetypes such as 'the Auld Fellas', 'the grumpy, devoutly Catholic widow', 'the wealthy Anglo-Irish Protestants', 'the new Parish Priest', and the 'Country School Teacher'.

== Characters ==
=== Pat Shortt's characters ===
The Irish comedian Pat Shortt, who writes the series, is responsible for many of the characters in the show. He plays Dan Clancy the village's storyteller and regular at Jacksie's, corrupt politician Willie Power, sexually empowered bed and breakfast proprietress Goretti, teacher Louis Cantwell and traveller Pa Connors.

==== Cllr. Willie Power ====
Cllr. Willie Power is the only Local Councillor representing the Local Electoral Area of Killinaskully presumably on North Tipperary County Council where Killinaskully is based. wheeler and dealer, fixer and chairman of every committee in the tiny village. A master stroke-puller, he is capable of turning any situation to his advantage and is excitable when someone tries to oppose him, particularly his arch-rival Larry Cummins. He was last elected in the 2005 Local Elections. He ran as the "Independent Republican Christian Social Democrat" Candidate where he received 1,900 votes beating Larry Cummins Independent and Dieter Langer Green Party. Known to be corrupt, he has a conviction of obstructing a tribunal into an insurance scandal.

==== Dan Clancy ====
Dan Clancy is an almost permanent fixture in Jacksie's Bar, the local public house. Dan is the man to ask about everything, he always knows an answer to everyone's question and he's known to be the best storyteller in the village, but as he says in S02 E03, most things in the parish, is made up. He boasted in the 2005 Christmas Special Episode that he had been to Jacksie's Bar "every day for the last 30 years". If in the bar he is rarely shown on-screen without a pint of Guinness on the counter in front of him. His trips to the toilet have become a regular gag on the show and have spawned Clancy a catchphrase. If he feels a need to go to the toilet he utter his catchphrase, "I must go strain the ole spuds", hops off his stool and walks to the toilet. Dan is rarely to be seen out of the company of his two sidekicks, drinking buddies and partners in crime Jimmy Bourke and Timmy Higgins. Dan first appeared in D'unbeliveables episode "D Mammy". He is shown to spend most of his time in the bar, albeit without his signature pint, instead with a whiskey. Dan is noticeably different in D'unbeliveables. While he still tells stories, he tends to seem drunk almost every time he's on screen, even in the morning. Whether there is some continuity between D'unbeliveables and Killinaskully is unknown, although it seems likely.

==== Goretti ====
Goretti is the sexually voracious Protestant proprietress of the Mount Bernadette bed and breakfast which is located beside Sgt Dick O'Toole's Garda station. A mistress of the double entendre, she has lived alone since the mysterious disappearance of her husband, the magician Mossie The Magnificent. In her spare time she is the leader of the local power walking group. She is good friends with the only other Protestant in town, Theo Wigmore. In S01 E03 Goretti's husband, Mossie the magnificent returns telling Goretti of how he was performing a magic when he made real magic! After sometime at home with her, he gets annoyed and stomps to the bathroom, where he lifts his wand and disappears!

==== Louis Cantwell ====
Mr. Cantwell is a teacher in the local school (albeit a not-so-good one as sometimes he smacks the children on the back of their heads ) and holds a not-so-secret affection towards Miss Fahy. He first appears in the second episode, entitled "The Date", when his affection for Miss Fahy meets competition in the newly arrived film maker Dieter Langer. Ever since Miss Fahy and Dieter got married, Cantwell is usually to be found in a depressed state over something or other, as the light has left his life. Cantwell appears as a caring person towards Miss Fahy but when it turns to school children, he's not short of insults for them!

==== Pa Connors ====
A member of the travelling community with a keen eye for business. He is based on Pat Shortt's character of Pa Connors from his DVD "Live and A Bit Dangerous". His brother is also called Pa Connors. He was named after his grandfather while the other Pa was named after his father. Pa and the local (quite corrupt) Garda, Sgt. Dick O'Toole are always trying to fraudulently sell some stolen items. Pa has a cousin, Martin, who accompanies him in his pursuit to get his mare, Brandy, from a foal to a fast race horse.

==== Sgt. Dick O'Toole ====
Played by Pascal Scott, O'Toole is the local member of the Garda Síochána. He presides over a garda station, which is part betting office, part hardware store and part adult video rental agency amongst other things and will never meet a member of the public without trying to sell them something. Business partner of Pa Connors as well as being a good friend and co-conspirator of Willie Power. Several years after the ending of the series, Sgt. Dick O'Toole moved residency to the picturesque town of Schull in West Cork, where he has formed a family and does road bowling in his spare time.

==== Jacksie Walsh ====
Jacksie Walsh, played by Páraic Breathnach, is the very grumpy proprietor of An Bonnán Buí (Irish for "The Yellow Bittern" and the title of a classic Irish language poem) and spends his days indulging Dan Clancy, Timmy Higgins and Jimmy Bourke, without whom he would long since be redundant. Jacksie was formerly a Christian Brother, although he was asked to leave by his superiors who believed his severe methods of corporal punishment were an embarrassment to the order. Strictly a Guinness man he has little time for people who order what he would consider exotic drinks. As of late, Theo Wigmore has moved in with Jacksie (in a bid to avoid a loan shark) leading to a lot of "Odd-Couple" style situations to occur between both men.

==== Jimmy Bourke ====
Bourke, played by Jack Walsh, is a mechanic by trade and is Dan Clancy's sidekick. Jimmy is an expert rally car driver and has won many racing titles. He spends most of his day in the local pub where he delights in hearing (and interrupting) Dan's stories.

==== Timmy Higgins ====
Timmy Higgins, played by Joe Rooney, is another one of Dan Clancy's sidekicks who spends most of his time in the pub. He is more often than not the butt of Dan and Jimmy's gibes and is frequently referred to by his two drinking buddies as a liúdar‚ through a succession of daft questions and observations. Timmy reveals he is 48 years of age when Dan asks him his age after Timmy tries to convince him that Santa is real. Timmy is in a relationship with Nurse Maloney, although he fears her greatly. According to the third episode his mother died in 1974.

==== Miss Catherine Fahy ====
Played by Aoife Molony, Fahy is the local primary school teacher. She is the object of Louis Cantwell's affections but marries the German Dieter instead. She makes her debut in the second episode, entitled "The Date", when the love triangle is first examined. She later marries Dieter.

"When the cuckoo falls from the nest it is time to marry the fish!"

— ^{Dieter's German proverb featured in Series V: Episode VI. It is used to describe the loss of Father Philip Eno's state of mind to the Widow Gilhooley when the priest refers to cheddar cheese as John Cleese.}

==== Dieter Langer ====
Dieter Langer, played by Louis Lovett, is a former German filmmaker who arrives in Killinaskully in the first episode with his partner Hans. Langer is a big fan of the singer Johnny Logan. After some difficulty in making their film, including the squashing of their equipment (and Hans) and Dieter's growing love for the local schoolteacher, Miss Fahy, Dieter switches trade to become a cheese vendor, a respectable trade which he hopes to use to woo his new love. He operates his Dieter's Driven Deli through the village from the back of his van. However, his cheese is responsible for causing some very strange dreams and the concepts of cheese and cheese-vending are used repeatedly for comic effect throughout the series. Still trying to come to terms with the strange ways of the locals, Dieter's desire to fit in is somewhat hampered by his innate belief in the importance of being earnest. Dieter ran against Cllr. Willie Power as the Green Party candidate in the 2005 Local Elections for the Killinaskully Local Area, he received 2 votes coming 2nd. His Father was a member of the German Parliament.

==== Fr. Philip Eno ====
Played by John Keogh, Fr. Philip makes his first appearance in the third episode of the first series when the previous parish priest, Fr. Mullarkey, is no longer fit to function and is packed off to a home for the bewildered. Eno is an amiable type who just wants people to get along, albeit his inadvertent habit of making insensitive remarks at the wrong time. He also has trouble remembering people's names. His name sounds like "Filipino" when said quickly, a running joke throughout the episode of his arrival as caused confusion prior to his coming. Amongst other things his unusual name led to a Filipino tourist being sworn in as parish priest of Killinaskully.

==== Larry Cummins ====
Played by Gerry Walsh, Cummins is a local politician with a consistent record: 1 vote at every council election. He is always seeking to put one over on Willie Power. Cummins makes his debut in the fourth episode of the series, entitled "The Sign".

==== The Widow Gilhooley ====
Played by Maria McDermottroe, Mrs. Gilhooley is a stern woman known for her insistence that she is "not in the habit of repeating" herself, a phrase she uses in several episodes. She is deeply pious and makes regular time for church, often taking a preachy tone when speaking to others. She is also described as an award-winning fiddler. She first appears in the same episode as Fr. Philip Eno.

==== Theo Wigmore ====
Played by Jim Queally, Theo is a well-educated Protestant Pharmacist with an air of sophistication and fan of literature who regularly quotes poetry and who likes to assist in the artistic and literary aspects of the community, such as directing the nativity play at Christmas. He makes his debut in episode two of the series, entitled "The Date". As well as dispensing medicines for all the unusual ailments suffered by the local inhabitants, Theo was once the acting landlord at Jacksies while Jacksie was at a funeral and now lodges with him since the time his life was put under threat by his dead mother's dealings with a notorious money lender. Their living together leads to frequent bickering which leads both men to look like an old married couple, much to the amusement of Dan, Timmy and Jimmy. Incidentally his mother makes an appearance in the fourth episode, entitled "The Sign", when she is portrayed by Ronnie Masterson.

==== Nurse Sheila Maloney ====
Played by Eileen Gibbons, Maloney is infatuated with Timmy. This infatuation is first addressed in the fifth episode, entitled "The Pitch". She expresses concern for him when he is in danger and is full of praise for him when he does something correctly. Although at the wedding of Dieter to Miss Fahy, she and Timmy share a drunken sexual encounter (in the bridal suite), which by the start of the following series, has blossomed into a relationship. She first appears in the second episode, entitled "The Date".

==== Bridie Clancy ====
Played by Mary Harvey, she is Dan's sister. She makes her first appearance in the first episode of the second series, entitled "The Election". She is an expert at rabbit hunting and has a knack for getting into potentially lethal situations and coming out unscathed. It is shown on several occasions that she has a soft spot for Sgt. Dick.

==== Cissy Cullen ====
A close friend of Mrs. Gilhooley, Nurse Maloney and Goretti. She is a very talented accordion player, and is fairly well-liked in the village. She is seen dancing with Jimmy at Catherine and Dieter's wedding.

==== Mrs. Collins ====
A close friend of Bridie and Dan, she is often seen chatting with Bridie in the village.

==== Michael Clancy ====
Played by Paul Fitzgerald. A troublesome schoolboy who has a habit of ruining important moments, such as spoiling the nativity play by saying that there was in fact room at the inn. He shares Dan's surname although it is not clear if he is related to him or not.

==== The Bally Boys ====
The Bally Boys are the arch rivals of Killinaskully's Dan, Jimmy, Jacksie and Timmy, they are from the neighbouring rival village of Bally.

== Cast ==
- Pat Shortt as Dan Clancy/Willie Power/Goretti/Cantwell/Pa Connors
- Jack Walsh as Jimmy Bourke
- Joe Rooney as Timmy Higgins
- Pádraic Breathnach as Jacksie Walsh
- Pascal Scott as Sgt. Dick O'Toole
- Louis Lovett as Dieter Langer
- John Keogh as Father Eno
- Mary Harvey as Bridie Clancy
- Jim Queally as Theo Wigmore
- Maria McDermottroe as Mrs Gilhooley
- Aoife Molony as Miss Fahy
- Gerry Walsh as Larry Cummins

=== Guest appearances ===
A number of well-known personalities have made appearances as themselves in Killinaskully. In episode six, entitled "The Funeral", RTÉ newsreader Ken Hammond and sports broadcasters George Hamilton and Jimmy Magee visit the village.

== Episodes ==
The series has often been repeated by RTÉ; below are the dates of original transmission of each series.

#	First airing
1	26 September 2004
2	25 September 2005
3	1 October 2006
4	30 September 2007
5	28 September 2008

== Reception ==
Killinaskully received poor reviews from critics but earned large viewership figures. Shane Hegarty, The Irish Times's television critic, said the programme emphasised the rural/urban divide and "because TV critics tend to stand very firmly on one side of that gap, they have seldom attempted to understand the popularity of something so old-fashioned, predictable and lazy." John Drennan of the Irish Independent commented if there was "a sweeter sound in Irish journalism than the wails of the effete South Dublin TV critic when RTÉ viewing figures show Killinaskully has trounced John Kelly's The View once again?" Drennan said division over the show was the modern equivalent of the 19th-century cultural wars over the language movement, with one side featuring "the sort of cultural snob who faints at the sight of a Centra breakfast roll and who also fondly imagines the drawing rooms and restaurants of South Dublin bear an uncanny resemblance to the set of Frasier". John Boland in the Irish Independent has said how the characters lack depth: "I've never been much of a fan of Pat Shortt's broad brand of comedy, with its gallery of cartoon-culchie villager wearing silly wigs and speaking in exaggerated mock accents." Boland continued, "Killinaskully makes Shortt's earlier work with Jon Kenny in D'Unbelievables seem like Curb Your Enthusiasm by comparison". Adele King dislikes the "paddywhackery", describing it as "insular, embarrassing and lacking in sophistication".

Despite repeated negative publicity from critics the show pulls in an average viewership of 500,000 for each episode, which rose as high as 800,000 for the Christmas specials on 25 December. In 2004 and 2005 it was Ireland's top-rated programme during the festive season. On 25 December 2005, 825,000 viewers tuned in to watch "A Killinaskully Christmas Carol". 25 December 2007 special episode attracted viewing figures of 770,000 for "Christmas Special IV: The Last Round". The 2008 festive double episode parodying The Emergency attracted 757,000 viewers, surprisingly losing its crown as Ireland's most popular Christmas Day show for the first time ever by 3,000 viewers to RTÉ News: Nine O'Clock. Despite this, the Christmas special was the fourth most watched television show in Ireland of 2008.

== See also ==
- D'Unbelievables
- Jumbo Breakfast Roll
- Pat Shortt
