= Chicken roll =

Chicken roll may refer to:

- Spring rolls with chicken, a type of appetizer in Southeast Asian cusine
- Chicken fillet roll, a common deli item in Ireland
- Chiko Roll, an Australian snack
- A chicken kati roll, street food from India

== See also ==
- Sausage roll
- Wrap (food), which may contain chicken
