= List of Killinaskully episodes =

This is a list of Killinaskully episodes. The show, created by and starring comedian Pat Shortt in a number of roles, aired on RTÉ in the 2000s.

== Series one (2004) ==
No.	Title	Original release date	Prod. code
1	"The German Fillum "	26 September 2004	D101
An air of excitement descends on Killinaskully with the arrival of a German film crew intent on making a documentary about rural Irish life. there is an unusual twist as the film crews patience reaches the end of its tether.
2	"The Date ^{1} "	3 October 2004	D102
Romance is in the air as German filmmaker Dieter Langer and headmaster Mr. Cantwell clash, as they both vie for the affections of the teacher Miss Fahy.
3	"The New Priest "	10 October 2004	D103
There is a new resident in Killinaskully, the new parish priest. However, the residents faith is put to the test when the new cleric turns out to be a little more exotic than they're used to.
4	"The Sign "	17 October 2004	D104
There is sad news in the village as everyone believes that Timmy Higgins' demise is imminent. A trip to his beloved "Spudworld" is hastily planned but, as Timmy heads for the airport, the terrible truth emerges.
5	"The Pitch "	24 October 2004	D105
The Killinaskully GAA club have been using "the pitch" for as long as anyone can remember, so, when the widow Gilhooley puts it up for auction they are confident it will be theirs. That is until a flamboyant American swaggers into town. The episode is a parody of the film The Field, based on the play written by John B. Keane.
6	"The Funeral "	31 October 2004	D106
Killinaskully is in festive mood as it prepares for the funeral of one of its most famous sons, showjumper Jumpin' Jerry Houlihan, but preparations for an extravagant burial are thrown into disarray.

^{1. This episode was originally entitled "The Teacher".}

No.	Title	Original release date	Prod. code
1	"Christmas Special I: The Nativity "	24 December 2004	TBA
Dan, Jimmy and Timmy endeavour to do their Christmas shopping in a rival town. Meanwhile a couple (including an expectant mother) arrive in Killinaskully and seek a place to stay...

== Series two (2005) ==
No.	Title	Original release date	Prod. code
1	"The Election "	25 September 2005	TBA
Killinaskully is gripped with election fever as the local elections take place. Councillor Willie Power is expected to hold his seat, however, he is challenged by Dieter Langer of the Green Party. Meanwhile chaos ensues in Jacksie's when his niece takes pink Snacks off the menu.
2	"The Dogs"	2 October 2005	TBA
The whole town stands to make a fortune when Jimmy nobbles Willie's greyhound and drives his price up for a big race. Only divine intervention can put the dog off his stride. Meanwhile, Dieter attempts to pop the question to Miss Fahy.
3	"The Visit"	9 October 2005	TBA
A visit from a dim-witted U.S. president claiming local roots fills the Killinaskullians with excitement. But when the town is taken over by Secret Service agents, only Dan, Killinaskully's own spin master, can put the president in his place.
4	"The Night Out"	16 October 2005	TBA
While nurse Moloney tries to whip Timmy into shape, the wedding of the year is put on hold after Dieter is found in a compromising position in the ladies' toilet. Despite the best efforts of Cantwell to take advantage of the situation and Miss Fahy, a romantic gesture of Hollywood proportions saves the day.
5	"The Ad"	23 October 2005	TBA
Dan gets more than he bargained for when he places an ad in the lonely hearts page of the Gazette, while Jacksie and Fr. Philip go head to head over the contraption in the gents toilet.
6	"The Play"	30 October 2005	TBA
Killinaskully is poised to take on arch enemy, Bally, in the second Annual One-Act Drama Festival. It's been fifty years since the first one so all eyes are on Dan as he thatches the set of The Priest and the Pot 'o Soup but, it being Halloween, there might be a scary outcome.

No.	Title	Original release date	Prod. code
2	"Christmas Special II: A Killinaskully Christmas Carol"	24 December 2005	TBA
Dan is visited by three ghosts on Christmas night who help him discover the true meaning of the season.

"Behind The Scenes at Killinaskully"

A making-of feature on the second season. It aired 13 November 2005

== Series three (2006) ==
No.	Title	Original release date	Prod. code
1	"The Radio Station"	1 October 2006	TBA
Killinaskully finds its voice when KCR radio takes to the air. Dan's Roger Whitaker albums are a big hit and Goretti tries to spread some romance with her phone-in show. But will the station coax people away from Jacksie's as Fr. Philip intended? Probably not.
2	"The Sports Day"	8 October 2006	TBA
It's a bad day for fr. Phillip when he discovered his that bally's new Parish priest is his old nemesis, fr. Bob 'speedy' Gilmartin. With the sports day coming up, all eyes are on the all priests 10k road race and the u-12 'friendly hurling match' between Killinaskully & the Bally boys.
3	"The School Year"	15 October 2006	TBA
When Miss Fahey disappears there is chaos at the school. Willy struggles to get a new principal before the school inspector arrives.
4	"The Driving Test"	22 October 2006	TBA
When Dan refuses to retract the sexist remarks that he makes about women drivers, all the women in the village go on strike.
5	"Cheese Dreams"	29 October 2006	TBA
It's Hallowe'en and Dieter decides to try out some new cheese on the unsuspecting Killinaskullians. With Merry Men, Zombies and a visit to the ER, Dieter's gastronomic episode turns into a bit of a nightmare ... or two ... or three.
6	"The Lifeboat"	5 November 2006	TBA
When a leak is sprung in the roof of the community hall, Willy Power decides to use the EEC lifeboat money to fix it. Chaos can only ensue when an inspector visits wishing to see the lifeboat... elsewhere Goretti discovers the delights of trampolining.

No.	Title	Original release date	Prod. code
3	"Christmas Special III: The Christmas Concert"	24 December 2006	TBA
Dan, Jimmy and Timmy discuss the existence of Santa in Jacksie's. Larry Cummins tries to persuade Fr. Philip to hold a nativity play while in the confession box. Fr. Philip suggests a Christmas concert instead. Goretti is asked to participate but is upset at the refusal of her magic act; cutting herself in half. Dieter goes Christmas shopping, leaving Timmy in charge of his cheese stall in the village. Sergeant Dick attempts to sell a lightsaber to Pa Connors. Willie Power asks Dick to dress as Santa for the village grotto but has to stand in himself at the last minute as Dick is called into duty. Later the stage is set for a special performance by Goretti and the Gorettis as the finale of the Christmas Gala Evening.

== Series four (2007) ==
No.	Title	Original release date	Prod. code
1	"The Horse Whisperer "	30 September 2007	TBA
Pa Connors has yet another get-rich-quick scheme while Jacksie bans speaking English in the pub. Pa soon finds that the course of true love does not run smoothly, especially where horses are involved.
2	"The Stoats "	7 October 2007	TBA
With a by-pass threatening the future of the village and rumours circulating about the arrival of the Olympics, it would take all of Willie Power's cunning to save the day. Willie, however, is too busy trying to become a stoat.
3	"The Crime Spree "	14 October 2007	TBA
With Killinaskully in the grip of a crime spree, a concert by country singer turned rapper, Big Diddy, is expected to bring some relief. However, with Timmy playing backwards, he is threatened with a rap himself.
4	"The Visitor "	21 October 2007	TBA
Dan's old scouting buddy proves popular with the locals even though Dan has no recollection of ever meeting him. When the visitor dips his hand in everyone's pocket Dan turns detective.
5	"The Treasure Map "	28 October 2007	TBA
A mysterious stranger with an intriguing map lures Dan on a spectacular treasure hunt. There is also a giant golf ball on the loose (a parody of the Indiana Jones franchise) and the dreaded Bally Boys are up to their old tricks.
6	"The Wedding "	4 November 2007	TBA
Things are looking up for Dieter when Catherine returns from her travels and agrees to be his bride. But difficulties lie ahead in the shape of fighting in-laws and Timmy in charge of the rings.

No.	Title	Original release date	Prod. code
4	"Christmas Special IV: The Last Round"	24 December 2007	TBA
The people rejoice that the pub has closed for good, citing drink-driving as the main reason.

== Series five (2008) ==
No.	Title	Original release date	Prod. code
1	"The Will"	28 September 2008	TBA
Theo's mother dies but leaves Theo nothing in her will due to her being a secret opium addict (according to her solicitor).
2	"The Festival"	5 October 2008	TBA
It's festival time and hordes of mountainy men descend on Killinaskully to compete in the bachelor competition. The hopes of the village rest on Jimmy and his robotic dance.
3	"The Rally"	12 October 2008	TBA
The annual Killinaskully vs. Bally Rally
4	"The Trial"	19 October 2008	TBA
Dan, Timmy and Jimmy are convicted of manslaughter by Justice Blennerhassatt at Faggart Courthouse.
5	"The Heist"	26 October 2008	TBA
It looks like Dan's distinguished life on the dole is coming to an end when he pens an ill-tempered letter to the minister. There's nothing for it but to retrieve the offending post, but with a shop full of pensioners, a swat team and a rebel with a parcel bomb to contend with, Mr. Green and Mr. Pink have their work cut out for them.
6	"The Nature Walk"	2 November 2008	TBA
It's Halloween and Cantwell manages to lose himself and his entire class on a school trip to the forest. Eating mushrooms only complicates matters and, when Dan takes charge of the search party, the whole affair turns into a circus - literally.

No.	Title	Original release date	Prod. code
5	"Christmas Special V: The Emergency"	17 December 2008 (Part I); 24 December 2008 (Part II)	TBA
During Christmas 1944, the village's Local Defence Force fail to protect the nearby power station in Part I. In Part II, panic grips Killinaskully as the Luftwaffe attack.
