= Ghost estate =

Housing development abandoned during or after building and never occupied

A ghost estate (Irish: Eastát na Sí, "Fairy estate") is an unoccupied housing estate, particularly one built in the Republic of Ireland during the period of economic growth when the Irish economy was known as the Celtic Tiger. A massive surplus of housing, combined with the late-2000s recession, resulted in a large number of estates being abandoned, unoccupied or uncompleted. The National Institute for Regional and Spatial Analysis defines a ghost estate as developments of "ten or more houses where 50% of the properties are either vacant or under-construction", which therefore does not fully cover the total number of unfinished estates.

In 2010 there were more than 600 ghost estates in Ireland, and a government agency report estimated the number of empty homes in Ireland at greater than 300,000. The 2011 Census lists the number of empty homes to be around 230,000 (excluding the 60,000 holiday homes), around 26% of which are apartments, despite the fact that only 11% of the occupied homes are apartments. Of the 230,000 empty homes in the 2011 census, around 10% of these were in ghost estates. In November 2013, the number of vacant units in unfinished estates was 6,350. As at December 2014 there were 5,563 vacant homes in unfinished estates, however this figure is revised down to 4,453 homes (in the report for unfinished housing developments) as the difference is 1,110 vacant homes in estates no longer deemed to be unfinished. This means that the number of vacant homes in unfinished estates in 2014 had decreased by 30% in one year. The report for 2015 lists the number of vacant homes in unfinished estates to be 2,542. Vacant homes do not include derelict houses and homes under construction.

== Republic of Ireland ==
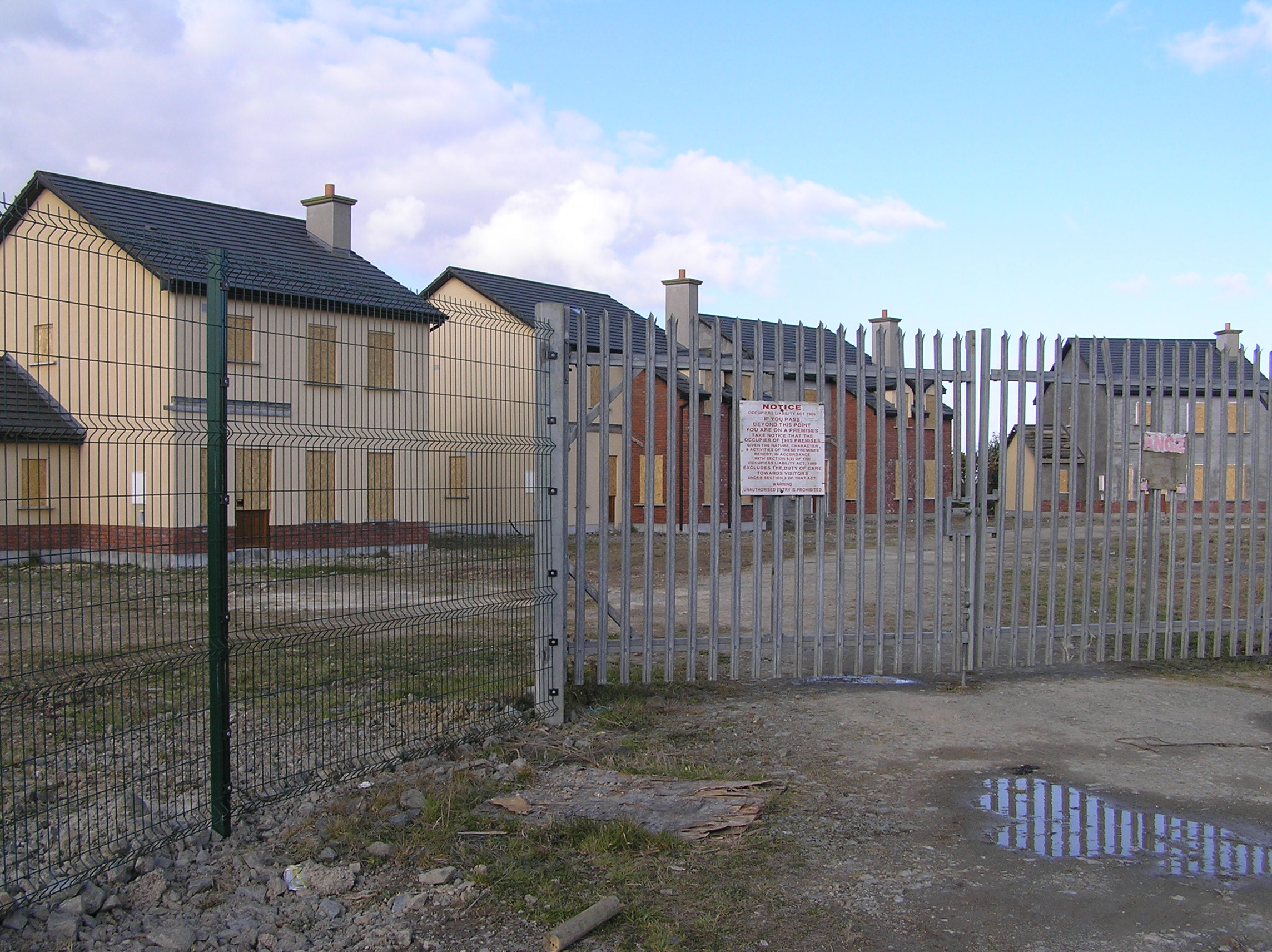
Ghost estate of some 10 houses outside village of Bridgetown, County Wexford, 2012 (in use as of 2025)

In October 2010, the Department of the Environment, Heritage and Local Government reported, using a restricted brief, that there were 33,000 complete or nearly complete empty homes after a national audit and that there were a further 10,000 homes at various stages of construction. The phrase was introduced by journalist and economist David McWilliams when describing the Irish property bubble in 2006. It was used as the title of a poetry collection by Irish writer William Wall in 2011.

The government-funded research institute, the National Institute for Regional and Spatial Analysis (NIRSA) defines a ghost estate as "a development of ten houses or more in which fifty per cent or less of homes are occupied or completed". During Ireland's economic boom, which began in the mid-1990s and lasted until 2007, local government incentives, an influx of labour from Eastern Europe and abundant, easily available consumer credit combined with house price inflation in Dublin, resulted in a large number of housing estates being built in commuter towns and villages surrounding the country's capital.

As the boom continued, tax incentives were offered under the Rural Renewal Tax Incentives Scheme to encourage developers to build in smaller towns and rural areas further from Dublin, in counties including Cavan, Longford and Roscommon. In 2008, it was reported that Irish banks had lent 25 billion euro to builders and property developers for the construction of apartments and houses.

Estimates on the number of empty houses varies widely. In October 2008, it was estimated that Ireland had up to 50,000 homes – a year's supply – sitting vacant. A new survey in January 2009 suggested a surplus of at least 100,000 homes, although the Construction Industry Federation, a body representing the Irish construction industry, quoted a surplus of around 35,000. A further study, conducted by NIRSA in January 2010 produced data showing there were more than 300,000 vacant new homes in Ireland, and 621 ghost estates.

Additionally, many of the estates are in areas where the number of homes built greatly exceeds the number required, and which are too far from major employment centres; County Leitrim, for example, has a housing surplus of 401%. The Construction Industry Federation states a figure of 40,000 empty homes, while the Housing Minister Michael Finneran told the Cabinet that the number was between 100,000 and 140,000, although a government spokesperson later said that the number was "not precise" and that they did not "have an exact figure". The exact number of unused or incomplete houses is unknown; a nationwide audit is currently being undertaken, with the results due in Summer 2010.

In 2009, the Irish government announced that it would invest €20m in long-term leases for houses in ghost estates which would be used to decrease the waiting list for social housing, a plan criticised by some housing associations, who pointed out the lack of schools and services available to those living on the estates. Minister Michael Finneran had earlier said that the government would not purchase empty houses in ghost estates to add to its social housing programme.

The National Asset Management Agency (NAMA), a body created in 2009 by the government to act as a bad bank which will take on non-performing assets owned by Irish banks for land and property development deals, may acquire many ghost estates, even if the developer remains solvent. Commentators have suggested that local authorities may be encouraged to purchase some of the surplus housing. Every family on Ireland's waiting list for social housing could be accommodated in unused housing, with "hundreds of thousands left over".

However some estates lack infrastructure such as roads and lighting, and have no access to schools and other amenities, and have been described as having, "no potential to be economically viable." In April 2010, Ciarán Cuffe, Minister of State at the Department of the Environment, Heritage and Local Government, announced that the government may force housing developers to bulldoze unfinished estates on which they cannot complete work.

When the government introduced a household charge in the 2012 budget, a list of 1,321 "unfinished housing estates" were exempted from the charge.

== Northern Ireland ==
Due to the heavy presence of the public sector in the Northern Irish economy and its presence in the United Kingdom sterling area the housing bubble in Northern Ireland was considerably reduced. In spite of that, however, the Housing Executive estimated in August 2011 that there were up to 5,000 unfinished homes in Northern Ireland, though ghost estates themselves are rare.

== Outside Ireland ==
Ghost estates are not restricted to Ireland. There have been many apartments and other residential areas that were constructed during the 2000s that were never occupied or finished in Spain before its economy collapsed. The United States also has experienced similar effects during its housing bubble. Many unoccupied homes have been torn down.

Due to the economic slowdown in China, the effects of ghost estates are taking shape. After its stable economic growth from the early 1990s to the early 2010s, the Chinese economy has slowed down. Projects such as new neighbourhoods (such as the Chenggong District), shopping malls, and even theme parks are empty and/or incomplete because of the economic slowdown, although many later populated. This situation has been compared to Ireland and Spain.

== See also ==
- Chinese property bubble (2005–2011)
- Irish property bubble
