= Hanging with Hector =

- The show's logo is sprayed onto a wall by the presenter at the start of each show. This is then followed by the name of the person he is hanging with.
- Genre: Interview
- Starring: Hector Ó hEochagáin
- Country of origin: Ireland
- Original language: English/Irish
- No. of series: 3
- No. of episodes: At least 14

Production
- Running time: 30 minutes

Original release
- Network: RTÉ One
- Release: 9 September 2004 – 2008

Hanging with Hector is an Irish television series broadcast on RTÉ One. It is presented by the Irish personality Hector Ó hEochagáin (Hector). The show centres on Ó hEochagáin's exploits as he meets a different well-known individual for each episode and spends the day "hanging out" with them, engaging in their lifestyles and partaking in their chosen pursuits in a manner deemed entertaining for the Irish television viewing public. It has been criticised for being "about as original as washing your teeth each morning".

It is very similar to its more recent female equivalent Livin' with Lucy, although Ó hEochagáin, unlike Lucy Kennedy, does not actually live with the celebrities. The celebrities are largely male, with the most recent season including the chef Richard Corrigan, the former Irish rugby union international Trevor Brennan, the rugby analyst and radio presenter George Hook and, most recently, the horse trainer Aidan O'Brien. However, the female athlete Derval O'Rourke has featured in the past. The second season featured the comedian Jon Kenny (known as one half of D'Unbelievables) and snooker player Ken Doherty. The first season included the fraudulent banker-turned CEO of Galway United F.C., Nick Leeson, the footballer Niall Quinn and Ó hEochagáin's schoolboy friend and future radio partner Tommy Tiernan.

The very first episode saw Ó hEochagáin hang with his most profile figure, Bertie Ahern, who was still Taoiseach at the time the programme was filmed and aired. The episode included a business trip to Paris. The episode with the goalkeeper Shay Given took place at his home in Newcastle upon Tyne, United Kingdom. It was filmed just prior to a Premiership fixture with Arsenal F.C., and Ó hEochagáin famously acquired a pair of boots belonging to Alan Shearer. The episode with the comedian Dara Ó Briain followed him as he performed three shows in one night at the Edinburgh Fringe, made a television appearance on Friday Night with Jonathan Ross and visited Brands Hatch motor racing circuit to improve his driving skills. The episode with the actor Colm Meaney was filmed in Mallorca where the pair went swimming and got wheel-clamped before flying out to Norway for the Haugesund Film Festival where they attended a screening of the film The Boys (and Girl) from County Clare and sing to the Scandinavian audience a rendition of "Whiskey in the Jar". Also featured were the jockey Johnny Murtagh and the comedian Deirdre O'Kane.

== Episodes ==
=== Season one ===
Niall Quinn revealed his regret at becoming involved in the Saipan incident.

#	Date	Hanger with Hector
1		Bertie Ahern
2		n/a
3		n/a
4		n/a
5		Nick Leeson
6		Niall Quinn
7		Tommy Tiernan

=== Season two ===
Jon Kenny took Ó hEochagáin around his home town of Bruff, County Limerick, where they chatted to the local butcher, an Elvis impersonator, before attending a bullock auction. Ken Doherty took Ó hEochagáin on a tour of Preston as he prepared to compete in the season-opening Grand Prix. Ó hEochagáin then humorously refereed a charity match following a meeting with Jimmy White.

#	Date	Hanger with Hector
1		Jon Kenny
2		Ken Doherty

=== Recent archive ===
==== Season three ====
Ó hEochagáin travelled to a food festival in northern Scotland where he met Richard Corrigan, who took him to his new restaurant in County Kildare. They later visited London. Trevor Brennan met Ó hEochagáin in Toulouse, France and they visited Stade Toulousain, took a trip to the local market and challenged the local citizens to a game of boules. Derval O'Rourke gave Ó hEochagáin an insight into her athletic lifestyle as she travelled to Portugal to train in a warmer climate. She was then taken to the RTÉ Sports Personality of the Year awards and the couple flew via helicopter to Naas Racecourse. George Hook provided Ó hEochagáin with an insight into his journalistic, radiotorial, judgmental lifestyle.

#	Date	Hanger with Hector	Ref
1	2007	Richard Corrigan	
2	2007	Trevor Brennan	
3	2007	George Hook	
4	2007	Derval O'Rourke	

==== Once-off edition ====
Hector was with Aidan O'Brien to witness the preparations for the Breeders' Cup Classic in the United States. He also on his daily rounds with Aidan at Ballydoyle, on the Gallops and in the stables.

Date	Hanger with Hector	Ref
22 December 2008	Aidan O'Brien	
