= D'Unbelievables =

Irish comedy duo (1980s–2000; 2010–2011)

D'Unbelievables duo, Pat Shortt as Garda Tom Walsh (left) and Jon Kenny as Garda PJ Moloney (right) on their debut on The Late Late Show in the 1990s in the comedy sketch "Crimebusters"

D'Unbelievables were an Irish comedy duo from Limerick formed in the late 1980s by Pat Shortt and Jon Kenny. Together they created characters which could be seen on every street corner and pub in Ireland. They toured extensively all over Ireland for almost 10 years until Kenny was diagnosed with non-Hodgkin lymphoma in 2000, after which Shortt began a solo career and was the main force behind the RTÉ comedy series Killinaskully.

In December 2005, three of their past shows, "D'Video", "D'Telly", and "D'Mother", were released on DVD for the first time. The DVD was titled D'Collection.

On 3 December 2010, D'Unbelievables officially reformed and performed on The Late Late Show. They reunited for a one-off nationwide tour from January to April 2011 titled "One Hell Of A Do!"

Kenny died in November 2024, leading to the end of D'Unbelievables.

== Selected works ==
- One Hell of a Video
- D'Unbelievables
- D'Video
- D'Telly
- D'Mother
- D'Collection

== Tours ==
- 2011 Ireland Tour - One Hell Of A Do!

== Films ==
- The Closer You Get
- Angela Mooney Dies Again
- This Is My Father
- Saltwater
- Song of the Sea
- The Banshees of Inisherin
