= Joe Rooney =

Irish stand up comedian, actor and writer

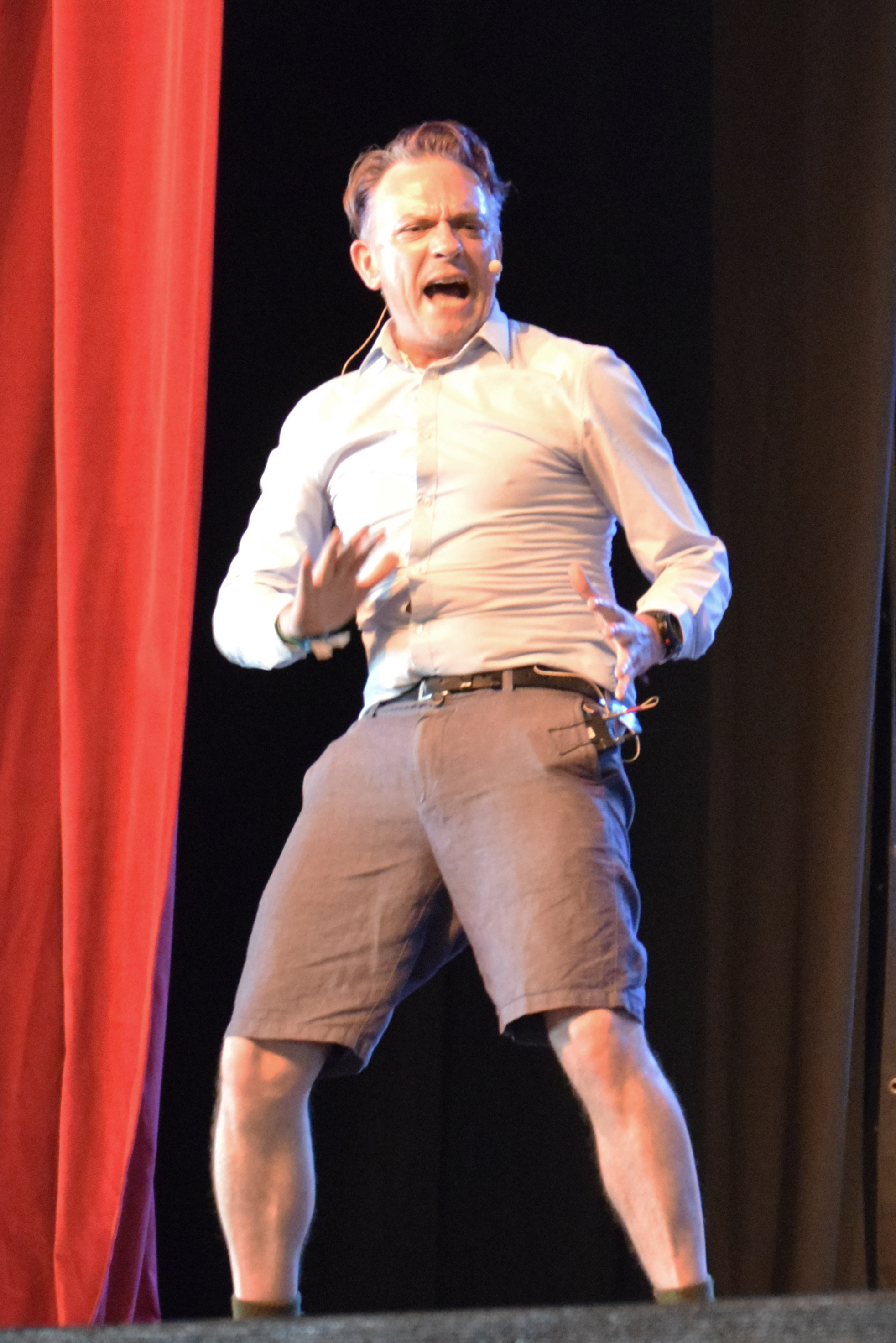
Joe Rooney at the Glastonbury Festival, 2019, with the Stephen Frost Improv All Stars

Joseph "Joe" Rooney (born 1 October 1963) is an Irish actor, comedian and singer-songwriter from Drogheda, County Louth.

After four years of fronting Dublin-based band Guernica in the mid-1980s, Rooney became better known for his acting and in particular for playing Father Damo in the Channel 4 sitcom Father Ted, appearing in the episode "Old Grey Whistle Theft" and a cameo in "Flight Into Terror". Rooney had a starring role as Timmy Higgins in the RTÉ television comedy Killinaskully, which ran for five series. Joe also wrote on the fourth and fifth series of Killinaskully. He hosts the podcast PodaRooney, on which he interviews guests who are mostly involved in the entertainment industry. Joe performed stand-up worldwide, including New York, Los Angeles, San Francisco, Chicago, Pittsburgh, Toronto, Shanghai, Beijing, Hong Kong, Barcelona, Brussels, Moscow, Muscat (Oman), Manama (Bahrain) and Dubai. He also performed at Irish festivals in Kansas City (Missouri), Milwaukee and La Crosse (Wisconsin).

Joe presented a children's summer weekday afternoon series called Jump Around for RTÉ, which aired as a stand in for The Den when it was rested during the summer. The series ran from 12 June to 1 September 1995 and included games, competitions, quizzes and television series and cartoons such as Widget the World Watcher, The Brady Bunch, Ocean Girl, Batman: The Animated Series and Teenage Mutant Hero Turtles.

In more recent years Joe has had roles in TV3's Red Rock, CBBC's Roy and the feature films Monged and South. He had a starring role in the 2018 feature film Wretch shot in Kansas City by first time writer/director Mathew Dunehoo. He starred alongside Moe Dunford in the short film Stephanie (2018) directed by Fergal Costello. He was also involved with "Talking Ted", a Father Ted podcast from the HeadStuff Podcast Network.

Other acting roles included Fergus Scully, a roving reporter who speaks in pidgin English and Irish, on the TG4 sketch show Rí Rá. In 1997, he appeared with Paul Tylak in Messrs Tylak and Rooney, a twelve-episode TV3 comedy travel series.
