= Leviathan: Political Cabaret =

Leviathan: Political Cabaret is a regular debate and discussion event in Dublin, Ireland which is usually hosted by economist, writer and broadcaster, David McWilliams in Dublin's Button Factory (formerly the Temple Bar Music Centre). Leviathan was established by Naoise Nunn in 2003 and has featured interactive debate and discussion with politicians, writers and commentators as well as satirical music by Paddy Cullivan and the Camembert Quartet and has commissioned new cartoons from Langerland.com. Leviathan hosted spoken word and debating tents at the 2006, 2007 and 2008 Electric Picnic festivals in Stradbally, County Laois. Leviathan was relaunched with a US Presidential Election Special on November 4, 2008 in the Button Factory, Dublin.
