= Global Irish Economic Forum =

Biennial conference held in Dublin, Ireland

- Official logo of the conference
- Date: 18–20 September 2009
- Cities: Farmleigh, Phoenix Park, Dublin, Ireland
- Participants: Various Irish and international figures from the worlds of business and culture
- Founder: David McWilliams

The Global Irish Economic Forum was a conference held in Dublin, Ireland in 2009 and 2011. Inspired by the World Economic Forum in Switzerland, international figures from the worlds of business and culture attend the event. The first Forum was held at Farmleigh in Dublin's Phoenix Park from 18 to 20 September 2009, and was given widespread coverage by RTÉ. The second forum was held at Dublin Castle in 2011.

== Background ==
The idea for the Forum was conceived by economist David McWilliams who then informed the Irish Government. The hosting of the event caused a political disagreement between Irish Minister for Foreign Affairs Micheál Martin and Tánaiste and Minister for Enterprise, Trade and Employment Mary Coughlan. The Department of Enterprise, Trade and Employment sought successful members of the Irish diaspora, with Taoiseach Brian Cowen personally inviting them to attend the event in April. However, Martin claimed that the "global Irish family" was his department's responsibility. Martin launched the event on the afternoon of 1 September 2009.

== Guests ==
Guests pay their own expenses. Attendees have come from Argentina, Australia, Britain, China, Europe, the Middle East and New Zealand. Michael O'Leary was notably absent because of his lack of popularity with the Irish Government. In alphabetical order, notable guests with international connections include:

- Craig Barrett, former CEO of Intel Corporation
- Loretta Brennan-Glucksman, chairperson of The American Ireland Fund
- John Collison, Limerick-born entrepreneur
- Kip Condron, CEO of AXA Financial
- Tom Corcoran, senior adviser with the Carlyle Group
- Dermot Desmond, financier, entrepreneur and major shareholder of Celtic F.C.
- Moya Doherty, producer of Riverdance and director of Tyrone Productions
- Irial Finan, Coca-Cola
- John Fitzpatrick, chief executive of Fitzpatrick Hotel Group
- Bob Geldof, political activist and former rock star
- Basil Geoghegan, managing director of Deutsche Bank in London
- James Hogan, CEO of Etihad Airways
- PJ Hough, corporate vice president of Microsoft
- Neil Jordan, Academy Award-winning film director
- Alan Joyce, CEO of Qantas
- Declan Kelly, director of American Ireland Fund
- Gerald Lawless, Jumeirah group
- Myles Lee, CRH plc
- Pearse Lyons, founder and president of Alltech of Nicholasville, Kentucky, USA, which is the name sponsor of Muhammad Ali's charity in Louisville
- Bob McCann, former head of Merrill Lynch's brokerage business
- Stan McCarthy, Kerry Group
- Brendan McDonagh, CEO of HSBC North America
- Paul McGuinness, manager of U2
- Denis O'Brien, chairman of Digicel
- Liam O'Mahony, chairman of Smurfit Kappa
- Gerry Robinson, former chairman of Allied Domecq and former chairperson and CEO of Granada
- Dan Rooney, United States Ambassador to Ireland
- Anita Sands, managing director of Citigroup in New York City
- Peter Sutherland, former Attorney General of Ireland
- Denis Swanson, president of the Fox Broadcasting Company
- Margaret Sweeney, CEO of Postbank
- Willie Walsh, British Airways

== 2009 Forum ==
=== Events ===
Taoiseach Brian Cowen gave the opening address, talking about the concept of a smart economy. A panel discussion then took place on the topic of "the global economy: positioning Ireland for the upturn" and this was followed by further panel discussions on "Ireland—the innovation island", "promoting brand Ireland through our global cultural profile", "Ireland’s image abroad: what is it now, how can it be improved and what role can new media play" and "Ireland and its Diaspora: harnessing unique resource".

Those attending also visited Áras an Uachtaráin for a meeting with President of Ireland Mary McAleese and Mary Coughlan presented a meal at Dublin Castle.

Guests will also attend the All-Ireland Senior Football Championship Final at Croke Park on 20 September. Micheál Martin, whose constituency is Cork South-Central, described it as "a piece of opportunistic planning by yours truly in anticipation that Cork would reach the final".

=== Controversies ===
Tánaiste and Minister for Enterprise, Trade and Employment Mary Coughlan was ridiculed in the Irish media after crediting Albert Einstein for Charles Darwin's theory of evolution. At the launch on 17 September, she made the comparison "like Einstein explaining his theory of evolution". The incident prompted comparisons with American politicians such as Dan Quayle and Sarah Palin, with the Evening Herald referring to Coughlan in a derogatory manner as a "lovely girl" and saying she was "Ireland's own version" of Palin. The error came in the same week as she referred to her Green Party coalition partners as "the vegetables" during an Irish language radio interview.

In an interview with Bloomberg Television at the Forum, shareholder Denis O'Brien said Independent News & Media might shut down its flagship London newspaper The Independent by the end of 2009, saying it was "irrelevant" and that nobody wanted to read it. O'Brien also advocated a Yes vote during the second Irish referendum on the Treaty of Lisbon, claiming it was "essential for setting Ireland on the path to growth".

Craig Barrett, former CEO and chairman of Intel Corporation, warned delegates that Ireland was spending "far too little" on education and that "schools are a bigger problem than banking". Taoiseach Brian Cowen seemed to agree with Barrett.

Bob Geldof said countries of a similar size to Ireland, some impoverished, were spending as much as 6 per cent on research and development but that Ireland spends just 2 per cent. He also said Mary Coughlan had "a lovely pair of legs" which caused her to blush.

On the second day of the forum, Irish Minister for Arts, Sport and Tourism Martin Cullen expressed his disagreement with proposed cuts in public sending which were suggested by the McCarthy Report. Neil Jordan said Ireland's culture had not disappointed the country in the same way as institutions such as the banks and the Church had done so. Denis O'Brien said Ireland's culture was the key to success, saying his Digicell group obtained a Samoan licence because the Prime Minister's education had come from Irish priests: "We are famous for our writers, our artists, our poets and we are not famous for much else". There was a consensus amongst those attending that Ireland's banks needed to be reformed. Micheál Martin, in his closing remarks to the Forum, said the contributions of the delegates "will be taken forward and action will be taken", spoke of his hopes to establish an "online portal for a virtual community of people of Irish descent to stay in touch" and stated he would also focus on non-traditional countries of the Irish diaspora such as Russia.

=== Reaction ===
President Mary McAleese praised the ""interest in and commitment to" of those who attended, saying the event showed that Ireland is "considerably more than an island on the edge of Europe, but the centre of a vast networked community".

Martin Murphy, managing director of Hewlitt-Packard Ireland, saw it as an opportunity to "truly begin positioning this small, export-driven country for real and sustained economic renewal and growth".
