= Páraic Breathnach =

Irish actor (b. 1956)

Páraic Breathnach (born 1956) is an Irish actor, performer, writer and storyteller.

== Early life and education ==
A fluent Irish speaker, Páraic grew up in Carna, County Galway. As a student in University of Galway, he was deeply involved with An Cumann Drámaíochta and Dramsoc, where he teamed up with Ollie Jennings in a series of cultural initiatives in and out of college.

== Career ==
Breathnach worked with An Taibhdhearc and Druid Theatres and became the first manager of Galway Arts Centre, before co-founding Mácnas with Ollie Jennings. He has appeared in several major Irish films throughout the years, including Michael Collins and Breakfast on Pluto. A frequent contributor to TG4, he also played the character of Jacksie Walsh on RTÉ's Killinaskully, a role he is best known for.

He has also been the managing director of the Galway Arts Center. In 2005, he was awarded an honorary degree from NUI Galway "for his immense contribution to cultural life in Galway and Ireland".

== Filmography ==
=== Film ===
Year	Title	Role	Notes
1988	Reefer and the Model	Quayside Fisherman	
1996	Michael Collins	Santry the Blacksmith	
1997	The Butcher Boy	Man on Truck	
1998	Sweety Barrett	Cannolly	
2003	Dead Bodies	Detective Gray	
2004	Ella Enchanted	Ogre No. 2	
2005	Breakfast on Pluto	Benny Feely	
2007	Graveyard Clay	Brían Mór	
2016	Out of Innocence	Martin Stapleton	
2019	Arracht	Fr. Joachin	

=== Television ===
Year	Title	Role	Notes
2003	The Clinic	Mr. Colgan	Episode #1.6
2003	Bachelors Walk	Builder	Episode #3.2
2003–2008	Killinaskully	Jacksie Walsh	31 episodes
2010	Jack Taylor	Father Malachy	6 episodes
2021–2023	Ros na Rún	Sonny Derrane	69 episodes
