= Jon Kenny =

Irish comedian and actor (1957–2024)

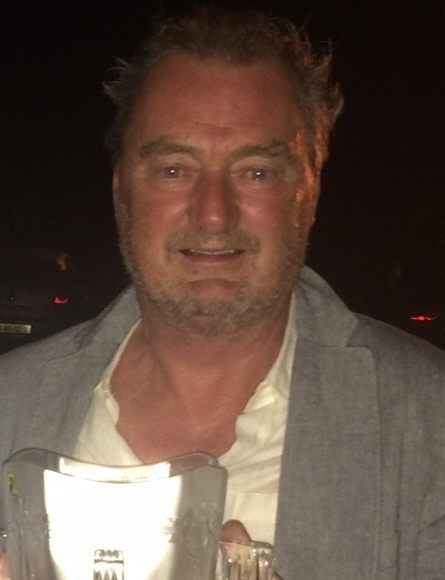
- Kenny in 2014
- Born: Jon Kenny; 28 September 1957; Hospital, County Limerick, Ireland
- Died: 15 November 2024 (aged 67); Galway, County Galway, Ireland
- Notable work: D'Unbelievables; Michael Concheese in Father Ted; Fred Rickwood in Father Ted
- Spouse: Marguerite Kenny (m. 1988)
- Children: 2

Comedy career
- Years active: c. 1972–2023
- Medium: Television; film; stand-up
- Website: jonkenny.net

Jon Kenny (28 September 1957 – 15 November 2024) was an Irish comedian and actor, best known as one half of the Irish comic duo D'Unbelievables with Pat Shortt. They were a successful duo until 2000, releasing One Hell of a Video, D'Unbelievables, D'Video, D'Telly, D'Mother and D'collection but the group stopped touring after Kenny was diagnosed with non-Hodgkin lymphoma.

== Early life ==
Jon Kenny was born in Hospital, County Limerick, on 28 September 1957. His mother's maiden name was Dirraine and his maternal grandparents came from Inishmore in the Aran Islands. His father died during Kenny's childhood.

Kenny had dyslexia and left school at 15. He started his entertainment career in 1972 singing and performing with the Limerick glam rock band Gimik before switching to acting.

== Career ==
Kenny, along with Shortt, as part of D'Unbelievables, won the Meteor Music Award in 2001 in the Best Selling Irish Video category for his work on "D'Mother".

He played two characters in separate episodes of Father Ted: Michael Cocheese in "The Passion of Saint Tibulus" and Fred Rickwood in "A Song for Europe". He later said that the famous protest scenes in the first episode were influenced by a priest he had known when he was a boy.

Kenny filmed a lead role in the independent Irish feature film Insatiable, directed by Jessie Kirby. On his 2007 DVD, Back to Front, Kenny said he played his first serious role in the film, the "nastiest man in Ireland".

Having taken a decade-long break from performing due to illness, Kenny returned to solo comedy in 2010 and continued to perform throughout Ireland with his one-man show. In the spring of 2007, Kenny released his first solo stand-up DVD Back to Front.

Kenny hosted the theatre show Mag Mell with visual artist Des Dillon and musician and composers Benny McCarthy and Conal Ó Gráda from 2012 until 2014; creating its puppets, costumes and set.

Kenny portrayed the character Gerry in The Banshees of Inisherin in 2022. One of his last acting appearances was in The Hurler: A Campion's Tale in 2023, appearing as the main character hurler Gar Campion's coach and mentor.

Kenny, along with castmates Kerry Condon, Colin Farrell, Brendan Gleeson, Barry Keoghan, Gary Lydon, Bríd Ní Neachtain and Pat Shortt, was nominated for the Gold Derby Award by the Gold Derby in the Best Ensemble category for his work on The Banshees of Inisherin in 2023. He was also nominated for the Critics' Choice Movie Award for Best Acting Ensemble in 2022 for his work on the film.

Kenny was also an accomplished singer, having performed with Sharon Shannon.

== Personal life, illness and death ==
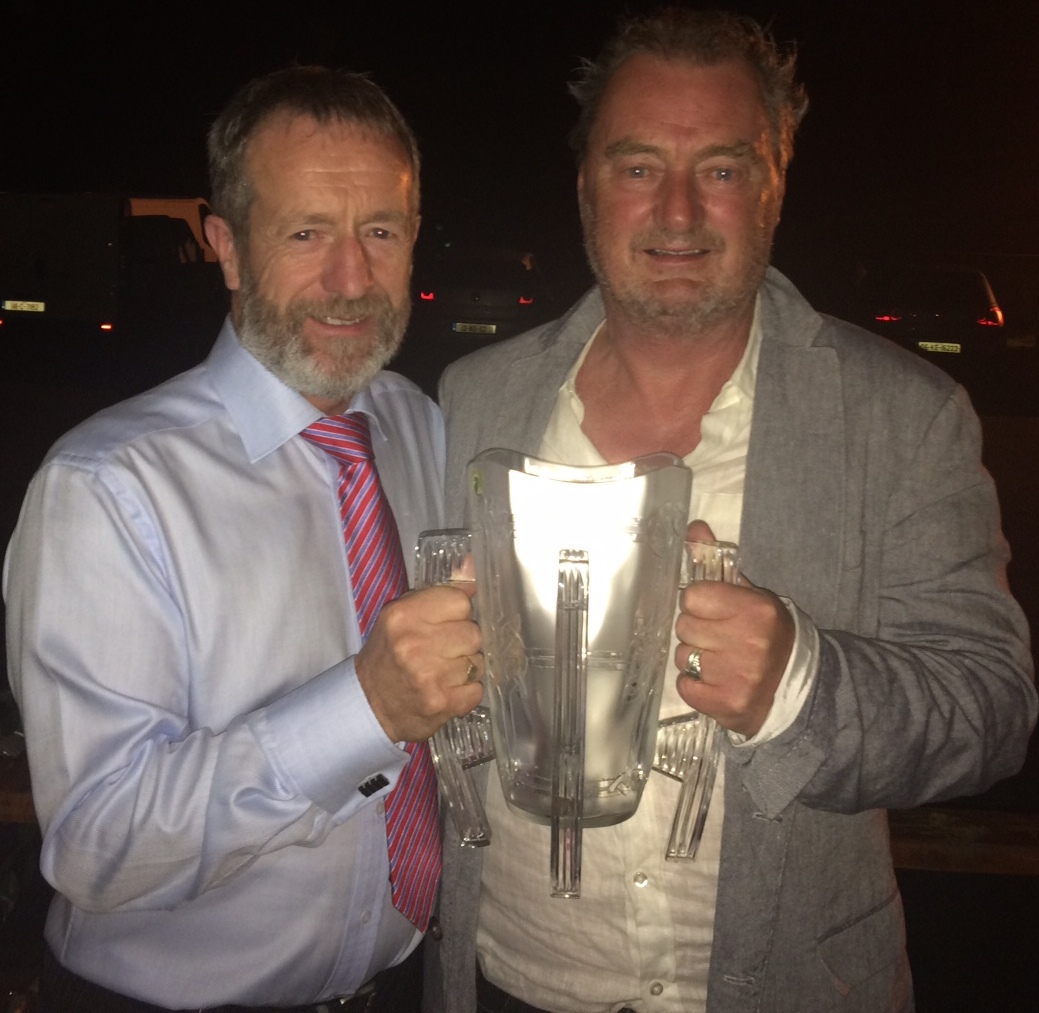
Kenny with Seán Kelly in 2014

Jon Kenny married his longtime partner Margy Murphy in 1988 and the couple went on to have two children, Aran and Laya. He was a supporter of Munster Rugby.

Jon was dyslexic and worked with NALA to destigmatise the condition.

Kenny was diagnosed with non-Hodgkin lymphoma in 2000 and received a stem cell transplant. He was fully treated in 2004. In 2011, Kenny underwent a triple heart bypass and suffered from heart failure afterwards. His cancer recurred in 2020 and he had lung surgery. From 2023, Kenny received chemotherapy after cancer was detected on his left lung. Additionally, he also underwent heart surgery.

Kenny died on 15 November 2024, aged 67, from heart failure and lung cancer, at the Galway Clinic in Ireland. He had suffered from a heart attack on 10 November and never regained consciousness. He was buried at the Lough Gur Cemetery on 19 November, after a funeral at St Patrick's Church, Patrickswell.

== Filmography ==
Year	Title	Role	Notes
1991	Nighthawks	Self	1 episode (12 February 1991)
1992	It's Bibi	Self	1 episode (24 November 1992)
1994	One Hell of a Do	Self	Writer
1994	Gortnaclune	Gerry/Pierre	1 episode (22 July 1994)
1995–1996	Father Ted	Michael Cocheese Fred Rickwood	2 episodes: "The Passion of Saint Tibulus", and "A Song for Europe"
1996	The Van	Gerry McCarthy	
1996	Angela Mooney Dies Again	Chaplin	
1996	D'Video	Self	Producer, writer
1998	D'Telly		Music department
1998	Les Misérables	Thénardier	
1999	Angela's Ashes	Lavatory Man	
2000	The Fitz	John F.	6 episodes
2001	D'Mother		Director, writer, composer, guitar
2001	The Late Late Show	Self	1 episode
2004	Hanging with Hector		Season 2 Featured along with Ken Doherty
2005	D'Collection		Compilation
2005	The Restaurant	Head Chef	1 episode: Season 3 Episode 5
2006	The Podge and Rodge Show		1 episode: Season 1 Episode 6 Co-guest with Frances Black
2007	40 Myles On: A Night of Irish Comedy		
2008	Dick Dickman P.I.		
2008	Insatiable	Mr Harvey	
2008	Celebrity Bainisteoir		8 episodes
2008	Back to Front	Host	Self performance
2011	Escape of the Gingerbread Man!!!	Paul/Storyteller/Kids	Voice for Kids
2011	D'Unbelievables One Hell of a Do	Tom/GAA Coach/Himself	Self
2012	Joe Dolan – Sweet Little Rock N Roller	Self	1 episode
2012–2014	Mag Mell	PJ Foley	Set decoration, costume design
2014	All Washed Up	Johnaton Renmore	
2014	Mrs. Brown's Boys D'Movie	Cunningham	
2014	Song of the Sea	Ferry Dan/The Great Seanachaí	Voice
2015	The Break	Derek	
2016	Pat	Pat	Titular character
2019	Love Her Bones	Tom Kenneflick	
2019	The Tommy Tiernan Show	Self	1 episode
2019	Niall Tóibín – Everyman	Self	
2020	Wolfwalkers	Stringy Woodcutter	Voice
2022	The Banshees of Inisherin	Gerry	
2023	Me Head is Wrecked with Tony Kelly	Self	Voice on 1 episode
2023	The Hurler: A Campion's Tale	Billy Byrne	Final role

== Awards and nominations ==
Year	Association	Category	Work	Result	Reference
2001	Meteor Music Awards	Best Selling Irish Video	D'Mother	Won	
2022	Critics' Choice Movie Awards	Best Acting Ensemble	The Banshees of Inisherin	Nominated	
2023	Gold Derby Awards	Best Ensemble	The Banshees of Inisherin	Nominated	
2023	International Online Cinema Awards	Best Ensemble Cast	The Banshees of Inisherin	Won	
