= Chicken fillet roll =

Hot chicken fillet in a roll

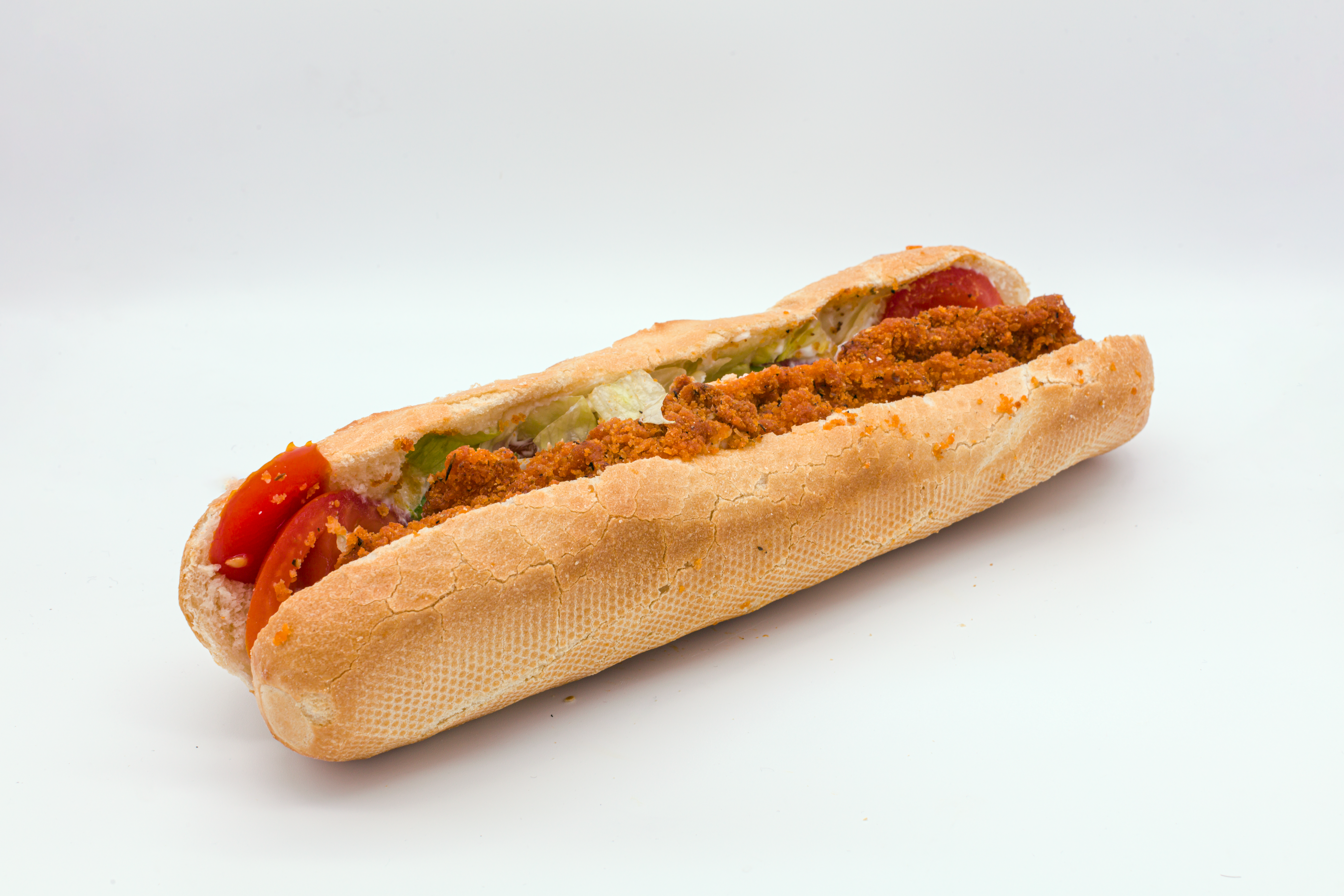
- An Irish chicken fillet roll bought in Dublin
- Type: Sandwich
- Course: Lunch or snack
- Place of origin: Ireland
- Main ingredients: Baguette; filling, such as chicken, butter, mayonnaise, lettuce, onion, cheese, condiments

A chicken fillet roll, also known as a hot chicken roll or chicken roll (Irish: rollóg sicín), is a baguette filled with a fillet of processed chicken.

== History ==
A chicken fillet roll

The roll is a ubiquitous deli item in Ireland, served at a wide variety of convenience shops, newsagents, supermarkets, petrol stations, fast food restaurants, and casual eateries throughout the country. It has been declared Ireland's favourite deli food. It is often cited as a hangover cure, and described as "Irish street food".

== Variations ==
In addition to chicken, the roll may contain butter, mayonnaise, other condiments, lettuce, onion, cheese, stuffing, or potato wedges. Taco sauce is a popular sauce for people to get on a chicken fillet roll; it is a mayonnaise-based sauce, which typically consists of ketchup, mayonnaise, mustard, and seasonings. Delis often offer a choice of chicken fillet breading, such as plain, spicy, or Southern-fried. Vegan chicken fillet rolls have also been available since 2021, using a plant-based meat substitute for the chicken.

== See also ==
- Breakfast roll
- Jambon
