= Jumbo Breakfast Roll =

Single by Pat Shortt
- Released: 16 February 2006
- Recorded: 2006
- Genre: Novelty
- Length: 3:37
- Label: Sony BMG
- Songwriter: Pat Shortt
- Producer: Dave Keary

"Jumbo Breakfast Roll" is a 2006 single by Irish comedian Pat Shortt, under the guise of Showband singer 'Dicksie Walsh'. The subject of the song is the ubiquitous (in Ireland) breakfast roll.

The song was a number one hit in the Republic of Ireland for six weeks. It was the best selling song of 2006 in Ireland, outselling Shakira's "Hips Don't Lie" by 500 copies.

According to figures compiled by GfK Chart-Track Jumbo Breakfast Roll came in at number 11 on the list of top selling songs of the decade. Pat Howe, music manager for HMV Ireland described it as a "guilty pleasure" and noted the Irish have a thing for novelty songs.

== Synopsis ==
The narrator of the song is a construction worker (based on the reference to a 'luminous jacket' and to 'a chippie or a sparkie or a brickie'). The man feels he has no time for a good breakfast, not even muesli; instead, he goes to the local filling station and buys a jumbo breakfast roll. The narrator describes his breakfast roll as containing two eggs, two sausages, two rashers, two other cuts of bacon, two puddings ('one black, one white') and sauce; he likes tea with milk and sugar with his roll. He suggests that a breakfast roll is perfect for those who work out and about on a daily basis.

The song takes a twist halfway through, when the narrator has a stomach ache after having his daily breakfast roll. He consults with his doctor, who is appalled to discover that his patient has a breakfast roll (or 'artery blocker') every morning. Determined to change the narrator's lifestyle, the doctor makes him walk 5 miles (about 8 km) every day, and visit a dietician named Noel. Several years later, the narrator has lost 3 stone (19 kg or 42 pounds), has a date with a vegetarian (and is going on her diet), has lower cholesterol and has a healthy heart. He admits, however, that he misses his breakfast roll and would 'sell his soul' to have one.

== Reprise ==
A reprise, called "Where Did My Money Go", deals with running out of money.
