= Song of the Sea (2014 film) =

2014 Cartoon Saloon animated film

- Theatrical release poster
- Directed by: Tomm Moore
- Screenplay by: Will Collins
- Story by: Tomm Moore
- Produced by: Tomm Moore; Ross Murray; Paul Young; Stephan Roelants; Serge Ume; Marc Ume; Isabelle Truc; Clement Calvet; Jeremie Fajner; Frederik Villumsen; Claus Toksvig Kjaer
- Starring: David Rawle; Brendan Gleeson; Fionnula Flanagan; Lisa Hannigan; Pat Shortt; Jon Kenny; Liam Hourican; Colm Ó Snodaigh; Lucy O'Connell; Kevin Swierszcz
- Edited by: Darragh Byrne; Darren T. Holmes (consulting editor)
- Music by: Bruno Coulais; Kíla
- Production companies: Cartoon Saloon; Melusine Productions; Big Farm; Superprod Animation; Noerlum Studios
- Distributed by: StudioCanal (United Kingdom and Ireland); O'Brother Distribution (Belgium); Haut et Court (France); Svensk Filmindustri (Scandinavia)
- Release dates: 6 September 2014 (TIFF); 10 December 2014 (France/Belgium/Luxembourg); 19 December 2014 (United States); 19 February 2015 (Denmark); 10 July 2015 (Ireland)
- Running time: 94 minutes
- Countries: Ireland; Belgium; Denmark; France; Luxembourg
- Languages: English; Irish
- Budget: US$7.5 million
- Box office: US$9.3 million

Song of the Sea (Irish: Amhrán na Mara) is a 2014 animated fantasy film directed by Tomm Moore and written by Will Collins, based on an original story by Moore. An international co-production between Ireland, Belgium, Denmark, France and Luxembourg, the film follows a 10 year old Irish boy named Ben (David Rawle) who discovers that his 6-year-old mute sister Saoirse is a selkie, who has to free faerie creatures from the Celtic goddess Macha whose owls eventually kidnap her, prompting Ben to rescue her.

Like other Cartoon Saloon films, the film combines traditional hand-drawn and computer-generated art, presented in a naïfstyle.This follows the style set in The Secret of Kells, with it mainly appearing with a flat or 2-dimensional aspect, but also incorporating some 3-dimensional image modelling. Aptly, the imagery of the animation is composed in the form of water-colours, especially in the backgrounds and in the narrative flashback scenes.

The film began production soon after the release of The Secret of Kells and premiered at the 2014 Toronto International Film Festival on 6 September in the "TIFF Kids" programme. The film was acclaimed by critics and had a limited release in certain countries. It won the Satellite Award for Best Animated or Mixed Media Feature and European Film Award for Best Animated Feature Film, as well as nominations for Best Animated Feature at the 87th Academy Awards and 42nd Annie Awards. The film is the second installment of Moore's "Irish Folklore Trilogy", following his previous film The Secret of Kells (2009) and later the film Wolfwalkers (2020).

The Irish-language version was produced by Macalla with funding from TG4 and the Broadcasting Authority of Ireland, with selected cinemas in Ireland screening it from 10 July 2015. Brendan Gleeson and Fionnula Flanagan reprised their respective roles in this version.

== Plot ==
In 1981, Conor, a lighthouse keeper, lives on an island off the north-west coast of Ireland with his wife, Bronagh. After bearing a human son named Ben, the couple expect a second child, but Bronagh disappears after giving birth to their daughter Saoirse.

Six years later, Conor dotes on the mute Saoirse, while Ben is resentful of her, as he blames her for his mother's disappearance (Ben also develops an intense fear of water); his sole companion is the family's Old English Sheepdog, Cú. On Saoirse's birthday, the children are visited by their Granny, who regards the lighthouse as an unfit place to raise the children. That night, Saoirse plays a seashell given to Ben by their mother and is led to a white sealskin coat inside Conor's closet. That night, Saoirse dons the coats and goes to the sea where she transforms into a selkie. After swimming, she is found by Granny on the seashore, and the frightened Conor locks the coat in a chest and throws it into the sea. Granny takes the children to her mainland home in Dublin, with Cú staying at the lighthouse. Along the way, Ben draws up a map of the route, and on Halloween he and Saoirse escape from Granny's home to return to the lighthouse for Cú.

Saoirse again plays Ben's seashell and is abducted by a trio of daoine sí, taking her to their lair underneath a bushy roundabout. The daoine sí rejoice at Saoirse's appearance, hoping that she can return them to their homeworld if she sings her song while wearing her coat. However, their jubilation draws the attention of owls belonging to a witch named Macha, who had turned the other daoine sí to stone by sucking their feelings out of them. The owls attack the shelter and turn the daoine sí to stone, but Ben and Saoirse escape. The children make their way toward the lighthouse to retrieve Saoirse's coat and are reunited with Cú, who swam across the strait in pursuit of them.

During a rainfall, Ben and an ailing Saoirse take shelter in a hut, where Saoirse falls into a holy well. Cú and Ben pursue Saoirse, but Ben gets lost and emerges in a cave inhabited by the Great Seanachaí. Through strands of the sage's beard hair, Ben sees the story of the giant Mac Lir, who cried out in a terrible fit of grief and threatened to flood the world. Macha, Mac Lir's mother, was unable to endure her son's anguish and thus deprived him of his feelings, turning him to stone. Finding Saoirse's whereabouts through another strand, the Great Seanachaí tells Ben that Macha has kidnapped Saoirse and that if Saoirse does not wear her coat and sing her song by dawn, she and all other magical beings will die. Following one of the Great Seanachaí's hairs to Macha's lair, Ben sees a flashback of the night Saoirse was born and learns the truth: Bronagh was a selkie, and she had to return to the sea so Saoirse could be born safely, leaving her husband and children behind.

Ben, in his encounter with Macha, learns that the grief-stricken witch seeks to save others from suffering and sadness by turning them to stone just as she had to Mac Lir. Macha herself has partially been turned to stone as she encloses her own strong feelings within enchanted glass jars. Ben finds Saoirse, who has nearly been turned to stone, in the attic. Apologizing for being a bad brother, Ben encourages Saoirse to play the seashell, which breaks the jars and returns Macha's feelings to her (though Saoirse drops the shell and it breaks into pieces), restoring her kindness. Macha helps Ben, Saoirse and Cú return to the lighthouse, riding the wind, with the aid of two spectral hounds of the air.

As Saoirse is exhausted and near death, Conor attempts to take her to a hospital on the mainland, unwilling to heed Ben's explanation. Ben eventually conquers his fear of water and dives into the sea alone to retrieve the coat, unlocking the chest with the aid of a group of seals. Saoirse puts on the suit and begins to sing, which frees all magical beings from their petrified state. As the beings depart for their homeworld, Bronagh appears before the family to take Saoirse with her. When Ben and Conor plead her not to take Saoirse, Bronagh gives her daughter the choice to stay, as she is half-human. Choosing to stay, Saoirse removes her seal coat, thus permanently untangling the two worlds. Bronagh shares one last goodbye with her family and departs.

Some time later, the fixed family celebrates Ben's birthday, and he and Saoirse go swimming with the seals.

== Voice cast ==
Character	English	Irish	Scottish Gaelic	French
Ben	David Rawle	James Ó Floinn	Caitlin NicAonghais	Jean-Stan DuPac
Conor	Brendan Gleeson	Brendan Gleeson	Dàibhidh Walker	Patrick Béthune
Mac Lir	Brendan Gleeson	Brendan Gleeson	Dàibhidh Walker	
Rock Shee		Niall McDonagh	Dàibhidh Walker	
Mossy	Colm Ó Snodaigh	Niall McDonagh	Iain MacFhionghain	Marc Perez
Ferry Dan	Jon Kenny	Niall McDonagh	Ailig Dòmhnallach	
Great Seanachaí	Jon Kenny	Maurice O'Donoghue	Iain MacRath	
Spud	Liam Hourican	Tomás Ó Súilleabháin	Iain MacRath	Pascal Sellem
Bus Driver	Liam Hourican	Tomás Ó Súilleabháin	Iain MacFhionghain	
Granny	Fionnula Flanagan	Fionnula Flanagan	Anna Mhoireach	Nathalie Homs
Macha	Fionnula Flanagan	Fionnula Flanagan	Donna Nic 'Ille Mhoire	Nathalie Homs
Bronagh	Lisa Hannigan	Gráinne Bleasdale	Màiri Nic 'Ille Mhoire	Nolwen Leroy
Saoirse	Lucy O'Connell	Fionán Farley Nolan	Catherine Tinney	
Young Ben	Kevin Swierszcz	Ríona Farley Nolan	Catherine Tinney	Thisbée Vidal-Lefebvre
Lug	Pat Shortt	Donncha Crowley	Ailig Dòmhnallach	Cyrille Artaux

Will Collins and Paul Young provide additional voices in the English version.

== Music ==
Song of the Sea

Soundtrack album by Bruno Coulais & Kíla
- Released: 1 January 2014
- Genre: Film score
- Length: 54:02
- Label: Universal Music Group

The original music for the film was composed by Bruno Coulais, in collaboration with the Irish group Kíla. "The Derry Tune" originally featured on Kíla's 2010 album Soisín. The film also features the voice of Lisa Hannigan and songs by Nolwenn Leroy. A soundtrack album, consisting of 25 songs from the film, was released digitally on 9 December 2014 by Decca Records.

Track listing

Song of the Sea (Original Motion Picture Soundtrack)
No.	Title	Length
1.	"Song of the Sea" (performed by Lisa Hannigan)	2:42
2.	"The Mother's Portrait"	2:26
3.	"The Sea Scene"	2:42
4.	"The Song" (performed by Lisa Hannigan and Lucy O' Connell)	5:16
5.	"The Key in the Sea"	0:59
6.	"The Derry Tune"	1:58
7.	"In the Streets"	1:05
8.	"Dance with the Fish"	2:05
9.	"The Seals"	0:45
10.	"Something Is Wrong" (performed by Lisa Hannigan)	2:04
11.	"Run"	2:31
12.	"Head Credits" (performed by Lisa Hannigan)	1:44
13.	"Get Away"	1:18
14.	"Help"	2:33
15.	"Sadness"	1:06
16.	"Molly"	1:05
17.	"I Hate You"	1:33
18.	"Who Are You"	1:19
19.	"The Storm"	1:55
20.	"Katy's Tune"	3:30
21.	"In the Bus" (performed by Lisa Hannigan)	0:44
22.	"The Thread" (performed by Lisa Hannigan)	2:24
23.	"Amhrán Na Farraige" (performed by Lisa Hannigan)	2:45
24.	"Song of the Sea (Lullaby) (From "Song of the Sea")" (performed by Nolwenn Leroy)	3:46
25.	"La chanson de la mer (berceuse) (Extrait du film "Le chant de la mer")" (performed by Nolwenn Leroy)	3:47
Total length:		54:02

== Release ==
The world premiere of Song of the Sea took place at the TIFF Kids children's event of the 2014 Toronto International Film Festival celebration on 6 September 2014. Theatrically, it was released in France, Belgium and Luxembourg on 10 December 2014. It received a limited release in North America on 19 December 2014, which qualified it for an Academy Award nomination. It was released in Ireland on 10 July 2015.

== Reception ==
=== Box office ===
The film has grossed CN¥15 million in China and US$857,522 in the United States and Canada.

=== Critical response ===
Reviews for Song of the Sea were overwhelmingly positive. Todd Brown, founder and editor of Twitch Film, gave a highly positive review of the film, saying:

A tale that weds absolutely gorgeous artwork with beautifully nuanced characters and a deep but natural rooting in ancient folk tales and magic, Song of the Sea has an assured and timeless quality to it. It is the sort of story that feels as though it always existed somewhere, just waiting until now to be told. [...] Song of the Sea is not about selling units, it's about story and heart and emotion and wonder and craftsmanship and because of that it becomes timeless, a beautiful piece of art that will delight audiences old and young and confirms what many suspected of Moore after Kells: The man's a master storyteller, and we can only hope he has many, many more stories to tell.

On review aggregation website Rotten Tomatoes, the film has an approval rating of 99% based on 97 reviews, with an average rating of 8.40/10. The site's critics' consensus reads: "Song of the Sea boasts narrative depth commensurate with its visual beauty, adding up to an animated saga overflowing with family-friendly riches." On Metacritic the film has a score of 85 out of 100, from 24 reviews, indicating "universal acclaim".

Joe Morgenstern from The Wall Street Journal he gave it an excellent rating and write "This is a film made by the other crowd, people who care about helping children to care about the medium of film for the rest of their lives". Michael O'Sullivan from The Washington Post gave the film four stars out of four, and said "Enchants on every level: story, voice work, drawing and music". Jeannette Catsoulis from The New York Times loved the film, writing "Song of the Sea moves delicately but purposefully from pain to contentment and from anger to love. On land and underwater, the siblings' adventures unfold in hand-drawn, painterly frames of misty pastels."

Kenneth Turan writing for Los Angeles Times gave the movie five stars out of five and said "Song of the Sea is a wonder to behold. This visually stunning animation masterwork, steeped in Irish myth, folklore and legend, so adroitly mixes the magical and the everyday that to watch it is to be wholly immersed in an enchanted world". Will Lawrence from Empire said "Visually, this is an exquisitely composed film, and it teems with curiosities and compassion. If on occasion the story seems to wander, it arrives at an enchanting destination". Writing in the Toronto Review, Carlos Aguilar said of the film: "Watching Song of the Sea it is easy to assert that this is one of the most blissfully beautiful animated films ever made. It is a gem beaming with awe-inspiring, heartwarming magic".

Sara Stewart from the New York Post said "If you want some real cinematic magic this holiday season, don't miss this enchanting Irish film about a pair of siblings and a piece of Celtic folklore that turns out to be true".

=== Accolades ===
Year	Award	Category	Recipients	Results
2014	Festival International des Voix du Cinéma d'Animation (Port Leucate, France)	Prix Spécial du Jury	Song of the Sea	Won
2015	42nd Annual Annie Awards	Best Animated Feature	Tomm Moore, Paul Young	Nominated
2015	42nd Annual Annie Awards	Character Design in an Animated Feature Production	Tomm Moore, Marie Thorhauge, Sandra Anderson, Rosa Ballester Cabo	Nominated
2015	42nd Annual Annie Awards	Directing in an Animated Feature Production	Tomm Moore	Nominated
2015	42nd Annual Annie Awards	Music in a Feature Production	Bruno Coulais & Kíla	Nominated
2015	42nd Annual Annie Awards	Production Design in an Animated Feature Production	Adrien Merigeau	Nominated
2015	42nd Annual Annie Awards	Writing in an Animated Feature Production	Will Collins	Nominated
2015	42nd Annual Annie Awards	Editorial in an Animated Feature Production	Darragh Byrne	Nominated
2015	19th Satellite Awards	Best Animated or Mixed Media Feature	Song of the Sea	Won
2015	40th César Awards	Best Animated Feature Film	Song of the Sea	Nominated
2015	87th Academy Awards	Best Animated Feature	Tomm Moore and Paul Young	Nominated
2015	12th Irish Film & Television Awards	Best Film	Song of the Sea	Won
2015	12th Irish Film & Television Awards	Best Film Script	Will Collins	Nominated
2015	28th European Film Awards	Best Animated Feature Film	Song of the Sea	Won
2016	6th Magritte Awards	Best Foreign Film in Coproduction	Song of the Sea	Nominated
2016	21st Empire Awards	Best Animated Film	Song of the Sea	Nominated
2017	2nd Irish Animation Awards	Best Irish Feature Film or Special	Song of the Sea	Won

== Home media ==
Song of the Sea was released on DVD and Blu-Ray in Region 1 by Universal Studios Home Entertainment on 17 March 2015.

It was later included in the Irish Folklore Trilogy Blu-Ray box set in the US and UK/Ireland along with The Secret of Kells and Wolfwalkers. GKIDS and Shout! Factory released the Region A box set in North America on 14 December 2021, while StudioCanal released the Region B box set in the UK and Ireland on 20 December.

== See also ==
- List of animated feature-length films
- Cartoon Saloon
- The Red Turtle
