= Breakfast roll =

Bread roll with elements of a traditional fried breakfast

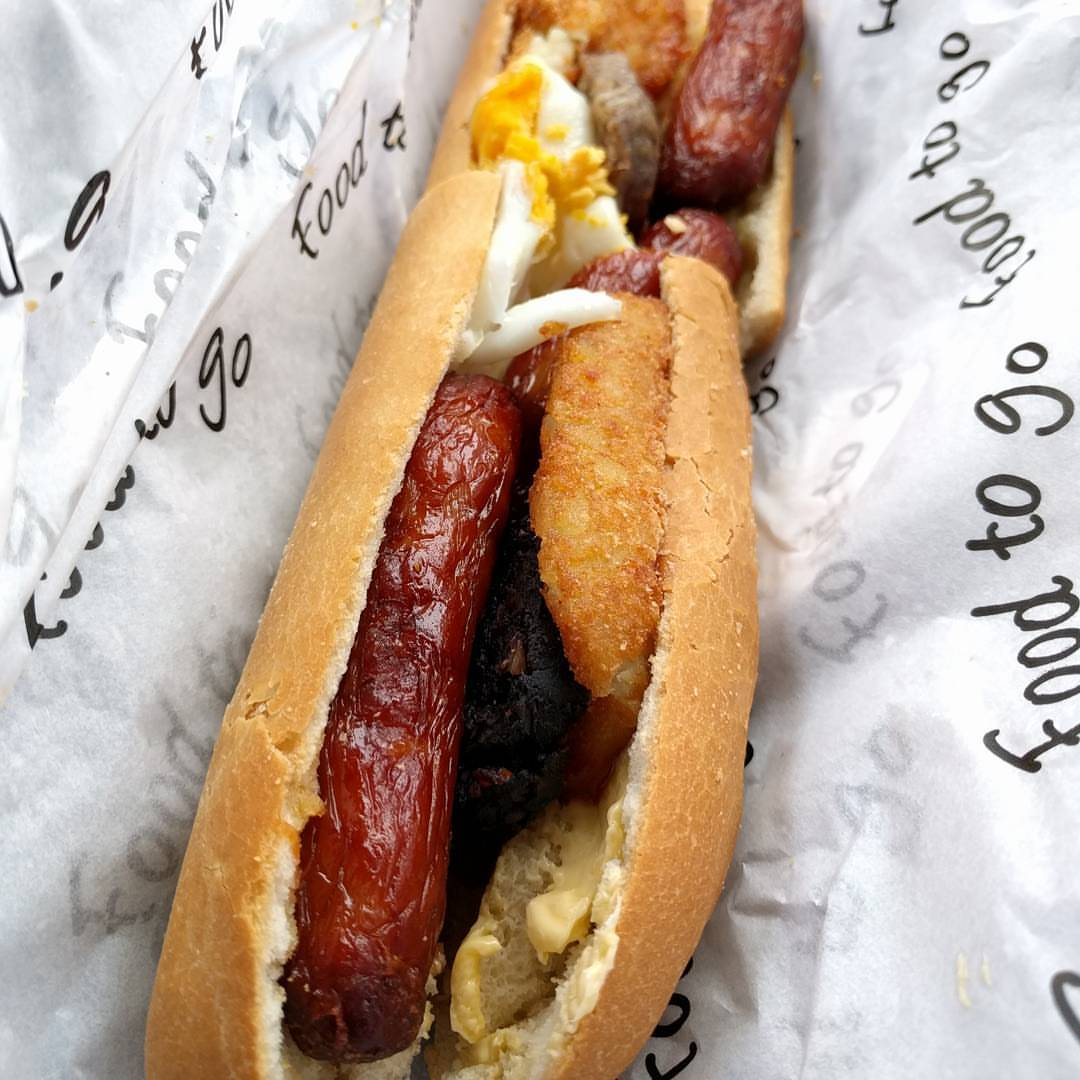
- Breakfast roll
- Alternative names: Breakfast roll
- Type: Sandwich
- Course: Breakfast or snack
- Region or state: Ireland
- Main ingredients: Bread roll; filling, such as sausages, bacon, white or black pudding, egg, hash brown, butter, mushrooms, tomatoes; tomato sauce or brown sauce
- Variations: Baguettes, sliced bread
- Food energy (per serving): ~1,200
Nutritional value
(per serving)
- Protein: ~20 g
- Fat: ~68 g
- Carbohydrate: ~87 g
- Similar dishes: Chicken fillet roll

The breakfast roll (Irish: rollóg bhricfeasta, [ˈɾˠoːl̪ˠoːɡ ˈvʲɾʲɪcˌfʲasˠt̪ˠə]) is a breakfast sandwich consisting of a bread roll filled with elements of a traditional fried breakfast. It is served at a wide variety of convenience shops, newsagents, supermarkets, petrol stations, and casual eateries throughout Ireland.

== Contents ==
A breakfast roll typically consists of a bread roll or baguette containing fillings such as sausages, bacon, white and black pudding, fried egg, butter, and tomato sauce or brown sauce. In some cases a hash brown, mushrooms, or tomatoes may be added; these fillings vary between cooks and restaurants. The roll itself is usually one of three varieties: a soft "submarine"-type roll, a chunky, spherical dinner roll or a demi-baguette. The demi-baguettes are distributed to shops partially baked and frozen, allowing stores to quickly bake the bread for a "freshly baked" roll. An "all-day breakfast" sandwich featuring some or all of the above ingredients in a traditional sandwich of sliced bread may be used instead.

A typical breakfast roll can contain 1,200 calories.

== Popular culture ==
The popularity of the breakfast roll (and novelty songs) in Ireland led to the song "Jumbo Breakfast Roll" by comedian Pat Shortt, which reached number one in the Irish music charts and remained there for six weeks. The song was number 11 on the Irish chart list of best-selling songs of the 2000s.

It has been argued that the breakfast roll became a national dish in Ireland during the Celtic Tiger economic boom of the 1990s and 2000s, becoming synonymous with "Breakfast Roll Man", the archetypal sub-contractor who was busy with construction work and needed sustenance on the move, before the bursting of the Irish property bubble in the late 2000s.

== See also ==
- Breakfast burrito
- Chicken fillet roll
- Mitraillette
- List of breakfast topics
- List of Irish dishes
- List of sandwiches
- Morning roll
- Hot dog
