= Irish property bubble =

Irish mid 2000s asset price bubble

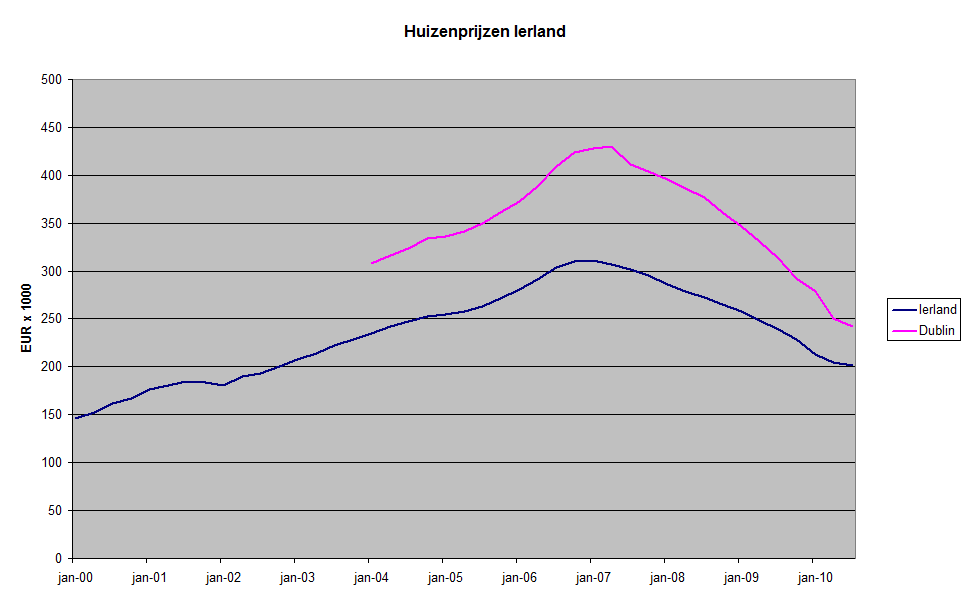
Houses prices in Ireland (2000–2010) Nationwide Dublin

The Irish property bubble was the speculative excess element of a long-term price increase of real estate in the Republic of Ireland from the early 2000s to 2007, a period known as the later part of the Celtic Tiger. In 2006, the prices peaked at the top of the bubble, with a combination of increased speculative construction (financed almost entirely by senior debt) and rapidly rising prices; in 2007 the prices first stabilised and then started to fall until 2010 following the shock effect of the Great Recession. By the second quarter of 2010, house prices in Ireland had fallen by 35% compared with the second quarter of 2007, and the number of housing loans approved fell by 73%.

The collapse of the property bubble was one of the major contributing factors to the post-2008 Irish banking crisis.

House prices in Dublin, the largest city, were briefly down 56% from their peak and apartment prices down over 62%. For a time, house prices returned to twentieth century levels and mortgage approvals dropped to 1971 levels. As of December 2012, more than 28% of Irish mortgages were in arrears or had been restructured and commercial and buy-to-let arrears were at 18%. Since early-2013, property prices in the country began to recover with property prices in Dublin up over 20% from their nadir.

The collapse of the Irish property bubble has had a lasting effect on the political, economic, social and financial landscape of Ireland. While early negative effects such as ghost estates and high unemployment have been largely resolved, the residual collapse of the Irish banking and construction sectors has contributed to a countrywide housing crisis that persists as of 2020.

== The bubble years ==
=== Background ===
From 1991 to 2001, Ireland's real gross domestic product (GDP) growth averaged above 7% and there was a large expansion in the workforce. From 1990 to 2000, the Irish gross national product (GNP) per capita rose 58%, bringing it above the European Union average. The pace of expansion in lending to households from 2003 to 2007 was among the highest in the Eurozone, with German banks having US$208.3 billion in total exposure to Ireland. These factors led to house prices increasing by 17% between May 2000 to May 2001 alone. In August 2000, an International Monetary Fund (IMF) report contended that Irish property prices were almost certainly heading for a collapse in the medium term since "no industrial country in the last 20 years had experienced price increases on the scale of Ireland without suffering a subsequent fall". From 2000, approximately 75,000 housing units were built every year as detailed by the Department of the Environment, Community and Local Government with sufficient planning permission being granted so that by 2005, there was enough zoned land to accommodate 460,000 new homes as housing density figures continued to rise each year. House prices went on to more than double between 2000 and 2006, with tax incentives being a key driver of this price rise. The Fianna Fáil-Progressive Democrat government received much criticism for these policies. In 2004, the independently produced Review of the Construction Industry, commissioned by the Department of the Environment and Local Government, estimates that 12% of the workforce were employed directly in the construction industry. One author described the "Breakfast Roll Men"—named after the popular convenience food construction workers often ate—as "the pumping heart of the economy".

Interest rates set by the European Central Bank (ECB) are only guided by low inflation targets in the Eurozone. Some felt this was, and is, too narrow an objective, leading to decisions on interest rates that are inappropriate, e.g. for states with record levels of employment, rising house prices, and consumer spending.

== Contributing factors ==
=== Poor financial sector supervision ===
The pace of credit expansion to finance the Irish housing bubble accelerated sharply in the years preceding the crisis. The relaxed and weak Irish regulatory supervision of the financial sector made the financing of excessively increasing real estate prices in the Irish market possible. The Financial Regulator and the Central Bank were responsible for the inadequacy of the financial stability system at the time of crisis. The financial institutions at the heart of the crisis have contributed to a general climate of mistrust in the transparency and accountability of the financial sector in Ireland, as well as in the capacity of corporate oversight and enforcement.

The Central Bank admitted in November 2005, that estimates of overvaluation of 20% to 60% in the Irish residential property market existed. The Irish Times revealed minutes of a meeting with the OECD which indicated that while the Central Bank agreed that Irish property was overvalued, it was fearful of precipitating a crash by "putting a number on it". Senior Allied Irish Bank officials expressed concerns in 2006 that Central Bank stress tests were "not stressful enough" — two years before the collapse of the Irish banking system. The CBOI continually ignored warnings from the Ireland-based Economic and Social Research Institute (ESRI) about the dangerous scale of bank loans to property speculators and developers.

Corrective regulatory action was delayed and timid to the unsustainable property price and construction bubble during the mid-2000s. After the bubble burst, Irish banks faced mounting losses on a scale that exposed them to a collapse of confidence following the Lehman Brothers' bankruptcy in September 2008; they then suffered acute liquidity pressures, which had to be met by Central Bank support, including emergency lending. Management abuses, which the CBOI did not restrain, were also revealed at Anglo Irish Bank, which had to be nationalised in January 2009.

In its annual report, which was published just three months before the government was forced to unconditionally guarantee the deposits of the Irish-owned banks, the Central Bank said: "The banks have negligible exposure to the sub-prime sector and they remain relatively healthy by the standard measures of capital, profitability and asset quality. This has been confirmed by the stress testing exercises we have carried out with the banks".

The next Annual Report had virtually nothing to say about how and why the Irish banking system was brought to the brink of collapse. Despite having four directors on the board of the Financial Regulator, the Central Bank maintained it had no powers to intervene in the market. Still, the Central Bank had the power to issue directives to the Financial Regulator if it appeared as though business was being conducted in a way that was contrary to overall Central Bank policy aims. None were issued.

In July 2009, a senior Central Bank official told the Oireachtas Enterprise Committee that shareholders (later corrected/clarified to refer to institutional investors) who lost their money in the banking collapse were to blame for their fate and got what was coming to them for not keeping bank chiefs in check. The official did admit that the Central Bank had failed to give sufficient warning about reckless lending to property developers.

A report by the Oireachtas Public Accounts Committee said it was "exercising inadequate supervision" and a proper analysis of loan books of the banks was not done.

The European Commission in a November 2010 review of the financial crisis said, "Some national supervisory authorities failed dramatically. We know that in Ireland there was almost no supervision of the large banks." Two months later, the president of the EU Commission in an angry exchange in the European Parliament, with a vehemence that shocked his audience, said that "the problems of Ireland were created by the irresponsible financial behaviour of some Irish institutions, and by the lack of supervision in the Irish market."

The CBOI had the government put contingency plans in place to provide armed Defense Force security for major Irish banks over fears of public disorder should a cash shortage be triggered at the height of the financial crisis.

The reckless lending practices of banks cost taxpayers €16,000 for every man, woman and child living in the Republic of Ireland.

=== Increased prosperity ===
Since 1994, the Irish economy saw considerable investment from multinational corporations. Irish education standards were perceived as high relative to those existing in other English-speaking countries. Improvements in the technical education area also played a key role in upgrading the skills of the Irish workforce. The combination of high education standards and capitalisation ratios in investment projects resulted in considerable improvements in labour productivity for the economy as a whole. This resulted in increased wage levels for the traded sector of the economy.

=== Eurozone membership and ECB interest rate policy ===
Ireland joined the initial launch of the euro on 1 January 1999, in accordance with the 1992 Maastricht Treaty and gave control of its monetary policy to the European Central Bank in Frankfurt, Germany, in accordance with the 1998 Treaty of Amsterdam. The euro contributed to the post-1998 investment rate in countries that previously had a weak currency through the integration of financial markets; however, there is little or no evidence that the introduction of the euro increased the efficiency of capital allocation. The introduction of the single currency, with European Central Bank interest rates being lower than what national interest rates would have been had Ireland not joined the Euro, meant that those buying property were encouraged to borrow larger amounts of money. As prices continued upward, financial institutions offered 100% loans, even more (to finance, for example, the purchase of furnishings and landscaping). Newspapers carried advertising for properties urging people to get onto the "property ladder," as property was seen as a guaranteed bet. Over time, the scale of residential mortgage debt reached a proportion that greatly concerned the Irish government because of its effects on the Republic's economy. The increasing cost of property and the need to borrow money to acquire property in Ireland resulted in substantial increases in the total level of private sector debt. This became of increasing concern to the Irish Central Bank, which had issued many warnings in an effort to affect consumer behaviour, but which signally failed to use any micro-economic tools such as prudential limits on lending or deposit requirements. Inflation was higher in Ireland than elsewhere in the Eurozone.

=== Impact of rising prices ===
A side-effect of high urban housing valuations was a drift into rural hinterlands to live in lower cost housing. This happened on a substantial scale in the Greater Dublin area in counties Wicklow, Kildare, Meath, Louth, and Carlow. This resulted in infrastructural pressure being placed on rural villages and provincial towns as residential developments exceeded the pace of both infrastructural development and provision of services for the growing population.

== Crash predictions ==
- In February 2000, William Slattery (Deputy Head of Banking Supervision in the Central Bank of Ireland until 1996) predicted a property price fall of 30%–50% was possible if credit growth was not curbed.
- In 2000, the International Monetary Fund stated that no industrial country in the last 20 years had experienced price increases on the scale of Ireland without suffering a subsequent fall.
- In 2003, the International Monetary Fund stated that residential property in Ireland was overvalued.
- In June 2005, The Economist news magazine suggested that a large bubble existed in the Irish market.
- In September 2005, the OECD and unnamed senior officials of the Central Bank of Ireland agreed that Irish property was overvalued by 15%; this was only released to the public by The Irish Times shortly afterwards. The Central Bank denied that they had deliberately withheld this information to avoid triggering a crash, and in April 2006, said the housing boom may be "unsustainable" and poses a "significant risk" to the economy.
- By March 2006 most economists thought that property prices were unsustainable because rental yields had fallen below the risk free rate of over 3.5% offered by Government bonds.
- In April 2006 the Economic and Social Research Institute said that a bubble probably existed.
- The Economic and Social Research Institute stated on 18 April 2007, in light of the RTÉ documentary on 16 April 2007, that the only activities there is economic certainty in is cigarette manufacturing and undertaking.

== Downturn ==
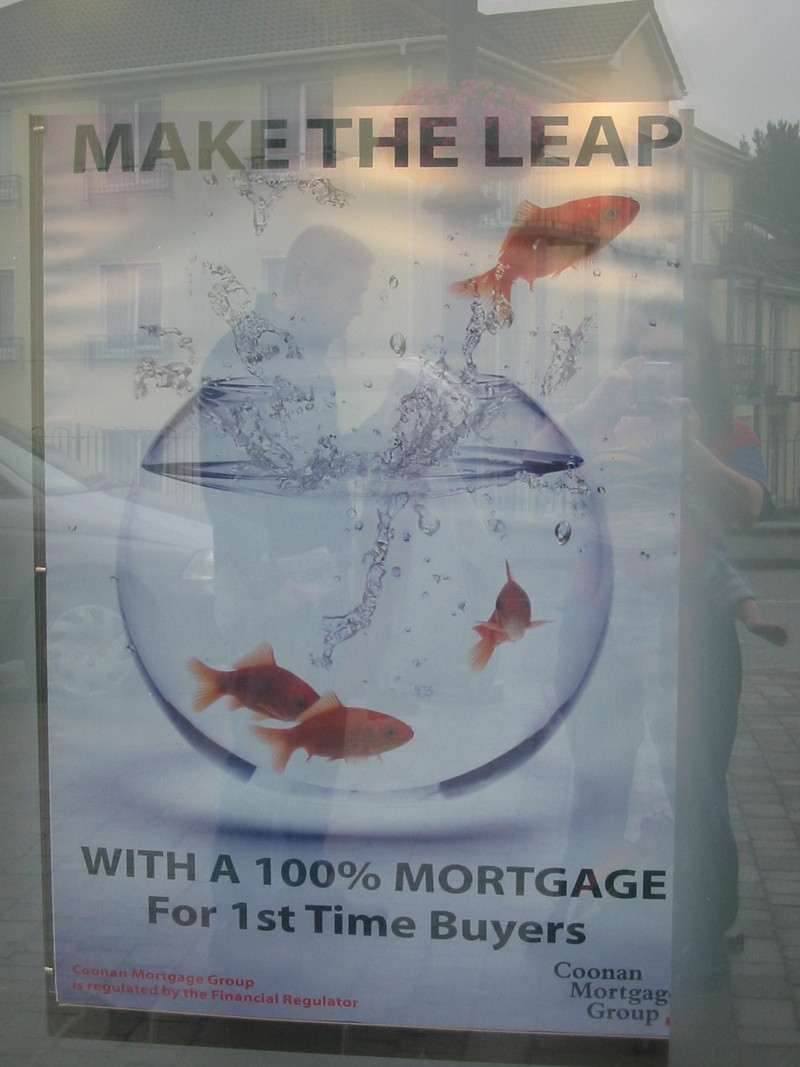
An advertisement for 100% mortgages seen outside Dublin (17 July 2007)

Eventually, demand for residential property fell in early 2007, resulting in price decreases of 0.6% in March 2007, and of 0.8% in April 2007. This led to an expectation of a drop in house prices on a quarterly basis for the first time since 1994. Houses in the commuter belt in Greater Dublin fell earlier, due to a combination of increased supply in the Dublin urban area, increasing interest rates, and continuing infrastructural deficiencies in rural communities. Prices in large urban areas were static, though demand dropped noticeably. However, a significant proportion of these new builds are unoccupied. Economic commentators give a figure of approximately 230,000 vacant properties. Of these, up to 115,000 or so may be holiday homes. Figures exist for completions because the Electricity Supply Board provides information on the number of properties newly connected to the electricity network and from data supplied by local authorities and from the Department of the Environment and the Central Statistics Office. Newspaper articles provided anecdotal evidence of declining valuations with respect to the guide prices, and the agreed prices for Irish residential property since October 2006. The decline in property prices was tracked by the ESRI House Price Index, which reported prices starting to fall in the second quarter of 2007. Construction employment dropped according to Live Register statistics for May 2007.

There has also been reported cases of mortgage fraud where borrowers overestimated their income to enable them to borrow more. There was a worry that these people "could fall into serious debt if Ireland had a property crisis like that in Britain in the late 1980s". This experience has resulted in the "sub-prime residential mortgage fallout" in the United States. In December 2006, the Irish state-owned broadcasting organisation, RTÉ, broadcast an investigation in a Prime Time documentary which unearthed evidence that financial details of prospective customers were being sold by mortgage brokers to auctioneers. Such information would enable auctioneers to maximise the price attained from prospective buyers. This issue, and further allegations in this area, are currently being investigated by the Office for Data Protection.

In the summer of 2007, the Economic and Social Research Institute issued its Quarterly Economic Commentary predicting that Irish public finances would fall into deficit in 2007, and house prices would fall by 3%. A research paper by UCD Professor Morgan Kelly, published by the ESRI alongside the Quarterly Economic Commentary, suggested that the "same people who told us we would have a soft landing are saying we will crawl out ... we have bottomed out. We have not. We are very far from the bottom of the property market." Up to 60 per cent could be wiped off the real value of houses over the following eight years to 2015 if the Republic's housing market followed the same pattern as those in other countries.

These reports were met with hostility by the political establishment; on 4 July 2007, Taoiseach Bertie Ahern stated at a conference in Donegal that he did not understand why people sitting on the sidelines, "cribbing and moaning" about the economy, did not commit suicide. Many bank economists, media commentators, estate agents, property developers and business leaders went on the record to state their belief that the Irish property market was healthy, and that any decrease in house prices was indicative was a soft landing only.

By late 2011, house prices in Dublin were down 51% from peak and apartment prices down over 60%. Residential property prices fell nationally by a further 13.6% from the beginning of 2012 to July 2012.

== 2009 crash ==
As predicted in earlier reports dating from 2006 and 2007, a property price crash hit Ireland by the first half of 2009. It coincided with the 2009 recession as both had started to develop in late 2008 following the global economic slowdown and credit control tightening. By June 2009, it was reported that around 40% of the price escalation that had occurred during the property bubble years ("Celtic Tiger Part 2") of 2001–2007 had been lost. As of 2012, house prices were below the 2001 prices and more than the entire gain during the Celtic Tiger years had been erased.

There were several groups and organisations that were blamed and that also accused others of causing the crash. Some of the more notable ones were:

- The Construction Industry Federation: blamed part-time builders for the bubble
- The Financial Services Consultative Consumer Panel, which was tasked with monitoring the performance of the Central Bank of Ireland, said that most consumers lost "significant amounts of money" due to the inadequacies of the financial regulatory structure. It also criticised the "deficient" response of the regulator to threats to consumers, including the property bubble. In response they said "It is clear that the actions we took were insufficient and were not taken early enough," Following the failure of existing regulatory structures to prevent excessive lending to the property sector, consultants were brought in to review their operations and said that "regulatory expertise was lacking in some areas." Former Taoiseach, Bertie Ahern said his decision in 2001 to create the Financial Regulator was one of the main reasons for the collapse of the Irish banking sector and "if I had a chance again I wouldn't do it".
- The banks: were accused of too loose lending practices, contributing not just to property prices spiralling out of control but also increasing the debt burden of the average citizen as they were to be later bailed out

In general, it was assumed to be a combination of factors that were both external and internal that affected the country. Further revelations of the corruption within the banking sector, particularly Anglo Irish Bank, have continued to affect the credibility of Ireland's presence within the international finance and business community.

During the property bubble, a disproportionate number of people were employed in the construction industry. As that has contracted and other manufacturing moved offshore, unemployment by May 2009 was at 11.4%, and had reached 14.3% by September 2011. The Economic and Social Research Institute estimated it will eventually reach around 17%.

== Impacts ==
- Approximately 31% of mortgaged properties, or 47% of the value of outstanding loans, were found to be in negative equity at the end of 2010.
- As of September 2011, Central Bank figures show that 8.1% of private residential mortgage accounts are in arrears for more than 90 days – up from 7.2% at the end of June 2011.
  - As of August 2012, more than 22% of Irish mortgages are in arrears or have been restructured.
- In the first 10 months of 2011, 8,692 houses were completed. This compares to 76,954 in 2004, 80,957 in 2005, 93,419 in 2006, 78,027 in 2007, 51,724 in 2008, 26,420 in 2009 and 14,602 in 2010.
- The Irish National Debt has significantly increased: Ireland's ratio of General Government Debt to GDP at the end of 2009 is estimated to have been 65.2%. The revised estimate for General Government Debt to GDP ratio at the end of 2010 is estimated to have been 92.5%. The forecast for General Government Debt to GDP ratio at the end of 2011 is estimated to be 105.5%.

== Facts and figures ==
- Up to 12.6% of the Irish workforce was employed by the construction industry in 2006.
- Up to 9.4% of Irish GNP was dependent on construction. Of this new residential housing construction made up nearly 7% of GNP.
- The P/E ratio (Total Price divided by annual earnings) for private housing reached an all-time high when, in March 2006, a Davy Stockbrokers report suggested that for prosperous Dublin suburbs the ratio could be approaching 100 times. Davy stated that these ratios can only be justified if investors were extremely bullish about rental growth. Given the plentiful supply of rental properties in these areas however, Davy suggested that it would be an adjustment in property prices, rather than rents, that would eventually bring valuations down to more realistic levels.
- Although housing indicators like price to income ratio and rental yields were worse in many other countries, high price per square meter and unsustainable Irish economy indicated a bubble.

== See also ==
- Ghost estate
- List of acronyms associated with the Eurozone crisis
