= David McWilliams (economist) =

Journalist, broadcaster and economist from Dublin

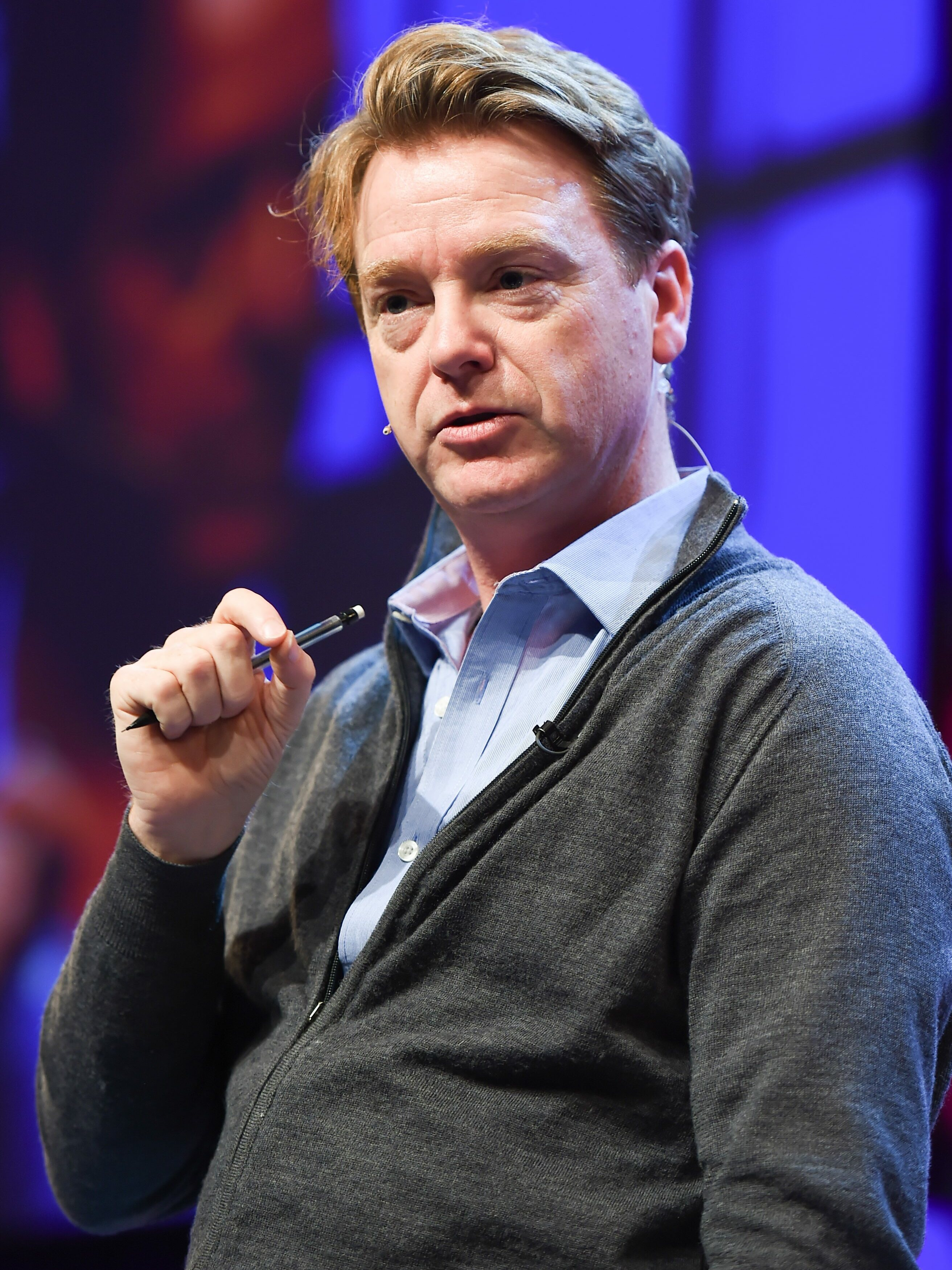
- David McWilliams in 2014
- Born: 1966 (age 59–60); Dún Laoghaire, Ireland
- Education: Blackrock College
- Alma mater: Trinity College Dublin; College of Europe
- Occupations: Journalist; Broadcaster; Economist
- Spouse: Sian Smyth
- Children: 2
- Website: davidmcwilliams.ie

David Prior McWilliams (born 1966) is an Irish economist, writer, and journalist. Since 1999, he has been a broadcaster, writer, economic commentator and documentary-maker. He has written six books, The Pope's Children , The Generation Game, Follow the Money, The Good Room, Renaissance Nation, and Money: A Story of Humanity, and written regular columns for the Irish Times and Irish Independent.

McWilliams has a reputation for explaining economic ideas with memorable phrases or stock characters, most famously "breakfast roll man".

== Life and career ==
=== Early and private life ===
McWilliams was born in Dún Laoghaire in 1966 and was raised in Windsor Park, Monkstown, Dublin. His father worked in a chemical and paint factory. His Cork-born mother was a teacher. He is married to Sian Smyth, a former corporate lawyer, who is from near Belfast. They live in Dublin.

=== Education ===
McWilliams attended Blackrock College in Dublin. He then graduated from Trinity College Dublin, with a degree in economics and social science in 1988. His Masters in economics is from the College of Europe, Belgium (1989).

=== Early career: 1990s ===
Between 1990 and 1993 he worked as an economist at the Central Bank of Ireland, a period which covered German reunification, the Maastricht Treaty, Bertie Ahern's term as Minister for Finance and Black Wednesday. Watching these phenomena unfold from the perspective of a Central Bank official shaped his opinions, and these events would be revisited in his writings, especially the triangular relationship between access to credit in Ireland, the retirement funds of an ageing German workforce, and European monetary policy.

==== Move to London: Early warnings about Celtic Tiger ====
McWilliams moved to London to work at UBS as a senior European economist and head of Emerging Markets research for Banque Nationale de Paris. He was one of the economists at the time who popularised the phrase "Celtic Tiger" in an analysis that compared the Republic of Ireland to the Tiger economies of Asia, predicting threefold growth per annum in the Irish market in the years 1995–2000. He credited what he described as "an economic miracle" to spending cuts by Charles Haughey's 1987 government, "which laid the foundations for the impressive growth in the 1990s".

During this time he was identified as an outlier among economists interested in Ireland in warning that the housing market in the Republic was running a price bubble similar to that of the housing markets in Boston in the 1980s and Thailand in the early 1990s. In 1996 he predicted a recession by 2005, noting that EMU meant that Ireland would enjoy low interest rates tailored to European neighbours with far lower economic growth than Ireland. In 1998 he specified that in the event of a world recession, Irish house prices would drop by 20%. and predicted a crash by the year 2000. While the Irish Independent described him as "alarmist" in relation to these comments in 1998, the same article also added that mainstream Irish economists who disagreed with him were overly complacent.

From 1999 to 2002, he was an emerging markets strategist with a New York-based hedge fund, Rockwest Capital.

In 2000 – the year he had previously predicted that the Celtic Tiger would end - he warned of a "Hong Kong style property market collapse" in the not too distant future, noting that Ireland was experiencing labour shortages, rising asset prices and high borrowing (five times the then European rate and four times the then US rate). Brendan Keenan of the Irish Independent described him as "the best known critic of the Irish economy" at the time. During 2001 Ireland experienced a foot and mouth outbreak which had an impact on the economy, with some commentators declaring the Celtic Tiger to be dead. However, when the impact to the economy turned out to be less negative than anticipated, his critics dismissed his analysis of the fragile Irish economy as alarmist.

=== 2000s: Writing and broadcasting ===
Since returning to work in Ireland, he presented a current affairs programme called Agenda on TV3, a breakfast radio show on NewsTalk 106 from 2002 to 2004 and a topical afternoon discussion programme called The Big Bite on the television station RTÉ One. All these shows were cancelled after relatively short runs. However, in 2005 McWilliams published his first book, The Pope's Children, which became a significant bestseller and firmly established his place as a household name in Ireland, well known enough to be referenced in the Ross O'Carroll-Kelly books and imitated on the satire TV show Irish Pictorial Weekly.

In The Pope's Children, McWilliams applied ideas which he saw used with great effect in Bobos in Paradise: The New Upper Class and How They Got There by American conservative writer David Brooks to Ireland, creating neologisms to describe certain economic actors as stock characters – HiCo and Breakfast Roll Man, for example. He wrote three more bestsellers: The Generation Game, Follow the Money and The Good Room.

==== Post 2008 ====
After the 2008 financial crisis, McWilliams was seen as having been finally proven right by many and became a more prominent presence in the Irish media. He wrote and presented documentaries in Ireland and Australia, mostly on economics topics but also exploring the Republic of Ireland's relationship with Britain and contributing to RTÉ's Ireland's Greatest series, arguing on behalf of President Mary Robinson. In 2010, he staged "Outsiders" a part stand up, part discussion, part social observation at the Abbey Theatre, Dublin.

McWilliams hosted Leviathan: Political Cabaret, a live discussion, political cabaret and satire event which featured at the Electric Picnic festival every year from 2005 to 2013.

Kilkenomics & Dalkey Book Festival

In 2010, McWilliams co-founded two annual events: the Dalkey Book Festival with his wife, Sian, and Kilkenomics a festival-style conference which combines economics with standup comedy.

McWilliams has worked with another way of looking at current events in economics using his Punk Economics Series of animated videos published on YouTube and also uses animations, music and video in his online economics course Economics without Boundaries.

Global Irish Forum

McWilliams conceived The Global Irish Forum, an event modelled on the World Economic Forum in Switzerland and inspired in part by Israel's social and economic ties to Jewish communities in trading partner nations (he has frequently referred to harnessing the power of a 'Global Tribe' ). It is an event where businesses and leaders, both at home and abroad can work together and contribute to Ireland's economic recovery, and to examine ways in which Ireland and its global community could develop a more strategic relationship with each other, particularly in the economic sector.

Podcast (2019-)

Following an appearance on a live episode of The Blindboy Podcast, McWilliams decided to launch his own weekly podcast in 2019.

== Political and economic views ==
While he has refrained from publicly supporting any political party in Ireland, he hinted at running as an Independent in the 2011 Irish General Election and raised awareness of individual candidates such as Dylan Haskins, Evelyn Cawley as well as Stephen Donnelly who would go on to become Health Minister with Fianna Fáil. He has also mentioned a belief in Schumpeterian economics.

=== Ireland and the 2008 recession ===
McWilliams had stated on multiple occasions in the 1990s that the circumstances were in place to create a housing bubble in Ireland, and had predicted a massive crash in the early 2000s which did not happen at that time; after Ireland recovered from the economic shock of 9/11 and the foot and mouth crisis, and his predictions were dismissed as alarmist, he expanded on his initial theory by describing Ireland's housing boom as a "confidence trick" by "an unholy alliance of bankers, landowners and a pliant political class" which would collapse resulting "in a generation in negative equity" on RTÉ. McWilliams was one of a number of commentators criticised for talking down the economy and damaging consumer sentiment. In 2008 and 2009, the Irish economy was especially exposed to the global economic downturn in a manner very similar to that predicted by McWilliams.

==== Bank guarantee ====
McWilliams was initially supportive of the bank guarantee of September 2008, describing Brian Lenihan's action as a "masterstroke" and claiming that by "coming up with a unique, Irish plan -- guaranteeing all deposits -- instead of importing a failed solution from abroad, he has instilled confidence in the Irish financial system." McWilliams even predicted that it would "obliterate[s] " the hedge funds who were short selling the Irish financial sector. It subsequently emerged that McWilliams had advised Lenihan on this policy.

Regarding the specific implementation of the bank guarantee, he explained in 2011 that his view was that it should have been rescinded (as originally envisaged) rather than prolonged, saying:

"Rescind the guarantee. It was due to expire last September and was always supposed to be temporary. This guarantee should not have been open-ended and all-encompassing. It should have copied the Swiss and Swedish model, where those countries lent the credibility of the state to the banks. Unfortunately, our Government didn't so much lend the State's credibility to the banks as give it to them unconditionally".

==== NAMA ====
McWilliams said that, providing the banks were reformed, some sort of "bad bank" would be necessary. One idea is to divide our banks into good and bad banks. We could set up one or two bad banks, which would be "financial skips" into which we throw bad loans. In 2009 McWilliams criticised NAMA as proposed, and was in turn criticised by Brian Lenihan.

==== Economic and Monetary Union ====
After the 2008 financial crisis, McWilliams questioned Ireland's continued participation in the Economic and Monetary Union of the European Union in his books. In an interview with Irish broadcaster Marian Finucane, on RTÉ (17 January 2009) and reported in the international press, McWilliams argued: "What I am saying is, that in Europe, if Ireland continues hurtling down this road, which is close to default, the whole of Europe will be badly affected, the credibility of the euro will be badly affected. .. It is very essential that we go to Europe and say we have a serious problem. … the way we get out of this is either – there are two options – either, we default, or we pull out of the euro. If we have a single currency, there are obligations and responsibilities on both sides. The idea that France and Germany can just hang us out to dry – as has been the talk the past few days – should not be taken lying down."

Williams is a member of the Advisory Panel of DiEM25

=== Brexit and Euroscepticism ===
McWilliams has frequently suggested that Ireland should leave the Euro and argued that the European Union is dominated by economies like Germany with very different priorities to Ireland. Despite hoping for a Remain vote and acknowledging that Brexit is a worse option for Britain, financially, he has expressed an understanding for why the British people might have voted for it with regards to issues like the desire for independence, noting that Switzerland and Norway pay handsomely to have access to the common market while remaining independent of the political union because they value the "feeling" of sovereignty.

=== Ireland and Israel ===
McWilliams, who briefly worked in Tel Aviv, has frequently suggested Israel as an economic and social role model for Ireland, arguing that the Republic should prioritise ties with the Irish diaspora around the world over EU member states with no historical connections to Ireland. In an article after Gaza war, McWilliams stated that "in postcolonial Ireland, we have the most pro-Palestinian population in Europe yet the most pro-American economy in the world. The Irish street is Palestinian, while the Irish boardroom is American... Ireland needs the West to be strong and unified."

Although McWilliams has defended and praised Israel in his writings, he has denied that he is a 'Friend of Israel' stating that he is "just somebody who is prepared to see an Israeli point of view".

== Controversies and criticisms ==
- During the late 2000s, comments were occasionally made on McWillams' capacity for self-publicity, with the Irish Independent writing in 2006 "when you strip away the clever catchphrases, the cliched buzz words and the soundbite economics, what's left?". In one instance he was described in Phoenix Magazine as the David Beckham of Irish media.
- McWilliams has been criticised for publicly pointing out flaws in projects that he has been involved in. While working for the Central Bank he admitted writing magazine articles criticising speeches he had written for then Finance Minister Bertie Ahern. In 2009 while promoting Follow The Money he declared that Brian Lenihan turned up at his house, looking dishevelled and chewing raw garlic, seeking advice on the bank guarantee. McWilliams claimed that he offered advice on this matter, subsequently writing that the idea was "a masterstroke" before going on to criticise it because McWilliams believed it was not implemented in the fashion he advised. Lenihan and McWilliams disagreed on the details of "garlic-gate".
- While promoting Follow The Money, McWilliams made comments about senior RTÉ journalist Miriam O'Callaghan where he accused her of flirting with and effectively trying to seduce her guests, writing "Miriam winks, with a faint pout and the casual lick of those hyper-glossed lips. You're mine now, boy, she signals. This is my web you've just walked into. Clothes on or off". This was widely criticised as sexist at the time, and McWilliams subsequently apologised.

== Awards ==
In January 2007, McWilliams was selected as one of 250 Young Global Leaders by the World Economic Forum.

== Bibliography ==
- The Generation Game (2007). ISBN 0-7171-4224-8.
- The Pope's Children (2005). ISBN 0-7171-4172-1.
- Follow the Money (2009). ISBN 0-7171-4254-X.
- The Good Room (2012) ISBN 0-2419-5620-X.
- Renaissance Nation (2018) ISBN 0-7171-8075-1.
- Money (2024) ISBN 1-4711-9543-0.
