= Morgan Kelly (economist) =

Economist from Ireland

- Education: Trinity College Dublin, Yale University
- Occupation: Academic
- Employer: University College Dublin (UCD)
- Known for: Predicting the end of the Irish property bubble

Morgan William Kelly is Professor of Economics at University College Dublin (UCD). Described by The Irish Times as the country's official soothsayer, Kelly notably predicted the bursting of the Irish property bubble.

== Background ==
Kelly studied at Trinity College Dublin being elected to scholarship in 1982 and graduating in economic and social studies with a gold medal in 1984. He subsequently studied in Yale University in the United States. He was assistant professor at Cornell University, College Lecturer at UCD and is now Professor at UCD. He has refereed numerous international economic journals.

== Predictions ==
Kelly predicted in 2006 that property prices were going to crash by 50% based on empirical evidence of past property crashes. Kelly has garnered praise from fellow economists for his prediction of the collapse of the property market.

In July 2007, Taoiseach Bertie Ahern implicitly criticised Kelly for his articles predicting a property crash:

Sitting on the sidelines, cribbing and moaning is a lost opportunity. I don't know how people who engage in that don't commit suicide because frankly the only thing that motivates me is being able to actively change something.

Ahern subsequently apologised for the reference to suicide in his remark.

Kelly takes the view that the Irish state should not have put itself forward as guarantor for the Irish banks in September 2008.

As of May 2011, Kelly suggests that bankruptcy for the state of Ireland is a possibility.
