= Pat Shortt =

Irish actor and comedian

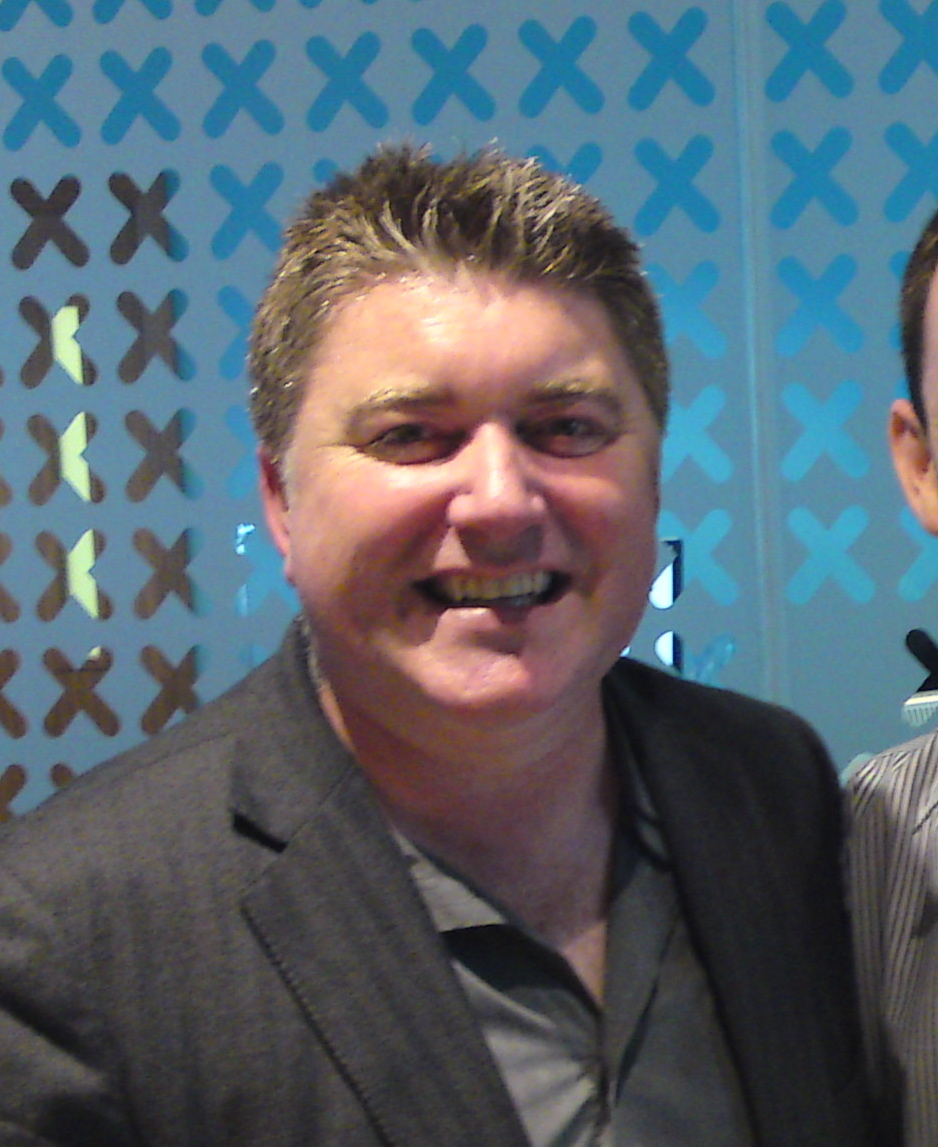
- Shortt in 2009
- Born: Patrick Shortt; 12 December 1967 (age 58); Thurles, County Tipperary, Ireland
- Notable work: D'Unbelievables; Father Ted; Garage; Killinascully
- Spouse: Caroline Shortt
- Children: 3

Comedy career
- Medium: Television, film, stand-up
- Website: http://www.patshortt.com/

Patrick Shortt (born 12 December 1967) is an Irish actor, comedian, writer, and entertainer. His role in the 2007 film Garage led to him receiving the IFTA for Best Actor. He is most notably remembered for his role as Tom in the television series Father Ted.

== Career ==
Shortt toured alongside Jon Kenny as the comedy duo D'Unbelievables. They released "One Hell of a Video", "D'Unbelievables", "D'Video" (a live random sketch show), "D'Telly" (featuring Shortt and Kenny playing various characters – primarily two brothers who run a shop together), "D'Mother" (in which Kenny's character oversaw the running of a public house alongside his "mother" – who was later revealed to be his father, in a role played by Shortt) and "D'collection". One character played by Shortt was Dan Clancy, known for telling "his stories". The pair were highly successful in Ireland, selling out the Vicar Street venue for 14 weeks. The duo stopped touring in 2000 after Kenny was diagnosed with Hodgkin's lymphoma.

Shortt played the role of Tom, a crazy man, in the comedy series Father Ted. His character maintained a unibrow and wore a tee shirt with the slogan "I shot JR".

In 2003, RTÉ approached Shortt to create a comedy series, Killinascully. Shortt elaborated on his work with D'Unbelievables, again playing Dan Clancy and a number of other characters. The programme ran for five seasons, with six Christmas specials.

In 2009, Shortt created and starred in a comedy, Mattie, for RTÉ, set in a Garda Síochána station. The series was retitled and reworked in 2011. The cast included Sue Collins.

He starred in the 2007 Cannes award-winning film Garage, directed by Lenny Abrahamson. Shortt won the Best Actor award at the 2008 IFTAs for his performance in this film. In 2008, An Post issued a postage stamp featuring Pat Shortt, as Josie, in the film Garage.

In 2014 Shortt appeared in Episode 3, Season 2 of the Sky 1 programme Moone Boy. In the episode, the main character Martin Moone and his friend Padraig float down the River Boyle on a raft. They land on an island in Lough Key where Shortt's character, the caretaker, entertains them and helps them to return to the mainland.

== Personal life ==
Shortt was born in Thurles, County Tipperary, one of 11 children of Mary (née Scully) and Christy Shortt. He studied at the Limerick School of Art and Design, and began his stand-up career shortly after graduating.

Shortt and his wife Caroline have three children. In 2020, he and his daughter Faye, an actress who trained at the Gaiety School of Acting, began creating sketches for social media. Faye Shortt subsequently co-wrote and performed in a sketch for RTÉ Does Comic Relief. Between 2020 and 2021, Pat and Faye Shortt co-wrote and performed two live-stream shows, before going on tour with their live comedy show, "Well".

== Filmography ==
=== Film ===
Year	Title	Role	Director	Notes
1993	In the Name of the Father	Unknown	Jim Sheridan	Uncredited
1996	Angela Mooney Dies Again	Dunner	Tommy McArdle	
1998	This Is My Father	Garda Ben	Paul Quinn	
2000	The Closer You Get	Ollie Doyle	Aileen Ritchie	
2000	Saltwater	Mr. Fanning	Conor McPherson	
2000	Wild About Harry	Ronnie	Declan Lowney	
2001	Mapmaker	Patsy	Johnny Gogan	
2004	Man About Dog	Fergie	Paddy Breathnach	
2004	Inside I'm Dancing	Nightclub Doorman	Damien O'Donnell	
2007	Garage	Josie	Lenny Abrahamson	
2007	Strength and Honour	Wheeler McCoy	Mark Mahon	
2008	Spacemen Three	Dr. Glen Hosey	Hugh O'Conor	Short film
2010	Soulboy	Brendan	Shimmy Marcus	
2011	The Guard	Colum Hennessey	John Michael McDonagh	
2013	Life's a Breeze	Colm	Lance Daly	
2013	Breakfast Wine	Mr. Kelliher	Ian Fitzgibbon	Short film
2014	Calvary	Brendan Lynch	John Michael McDonagh	
2014	Queen & Country	Private Redmond	John Boorman	
2014	Song of the Sea	Lug	Tomm Moore	Voice
2016	Twice Shy	Pat Collins	Thomas Ryan	
2016	The Flag	Harry Hambridge	Declan Recks	
2018	The Belly of the Whale	Ronald Tanner	Morgan Bushe	
2019	Animals	Bill	Sophie Hyde	
2019	Dark Lies the Island	Daddy Mannion	Ian Fitzgibbon	
2019	Satnav	Radio Comedian	Eugene O'Connor	Short film
2019	Maya	Ken	Sophia Tamburrini	Short film
2020	Pixie	Father Daly	Barnaby Thompson	
2022	Give Him Time	Liam Walsh	Danny McCafferty	Short film
2022	Lambing	John	Katie McNeice	Short film
2022	The Banshees of Inisherin	Jonjo Devine	Martin McDonagh	
2024	Vanilla	Simon	Tony O'Donnell	Short Film
TBA	Baggage	John	Jason Ruddy	Short film; In Development
TBA	Raynor	TBA	TBA	In Development
TBA	The People's Champion	TBA	TBA	In Development

=== Television ===
Year	Title	Role
1995–1996	Father Ted	Tom
2000	The Fitz	Bobby
2004–2008	Killinaskully	Various
2009–2011	Mattie	Mattie Dwyer
2014	Moone Boy	Island Joe
2015	Toast of London	Larry Muggins
2016	Smalltown	Tom
2021	Frank of Ireland	Padraig
2024	Bodkin	Darragh
2026	How to Get to Heaven from Belfast	Charlie
