= Angela Mooney Dies Again =

- Directed by: Tommy McArdle
- Produced by: Samuel Benedict and John Brady
- Cinematography: Seamus Deasy
- Edited by: Ron Davis
- Production company: Merlin Films
- Release date: 1997
- Running time: 86 minutes
- Countries: United States; Ireland
- Language: English

Angela Mooney Dies Again is a 1997 American-Irish film.

The executive produces were John Boorman and Kieran Corrigan.

== Plot ==
Americans want to take over the Irish creamery Angela Mooney’s husband built up. Everybody in town is delighted, with the exception of Mrs Mooney, who has her own reasons for being opposed to the sale of the business.

== Cast ==
- Mia Farrow
- Patrick Bergin
- Brendan Gleeson

== Production ==
The script was awarded a grant in 1989.

Filming took place in July 1996. it was shot at Roger Corman's studios for Concorde Anois but was not a Corman production.
