= Milkmaid =

Girl or woman employed to milk dairy cows

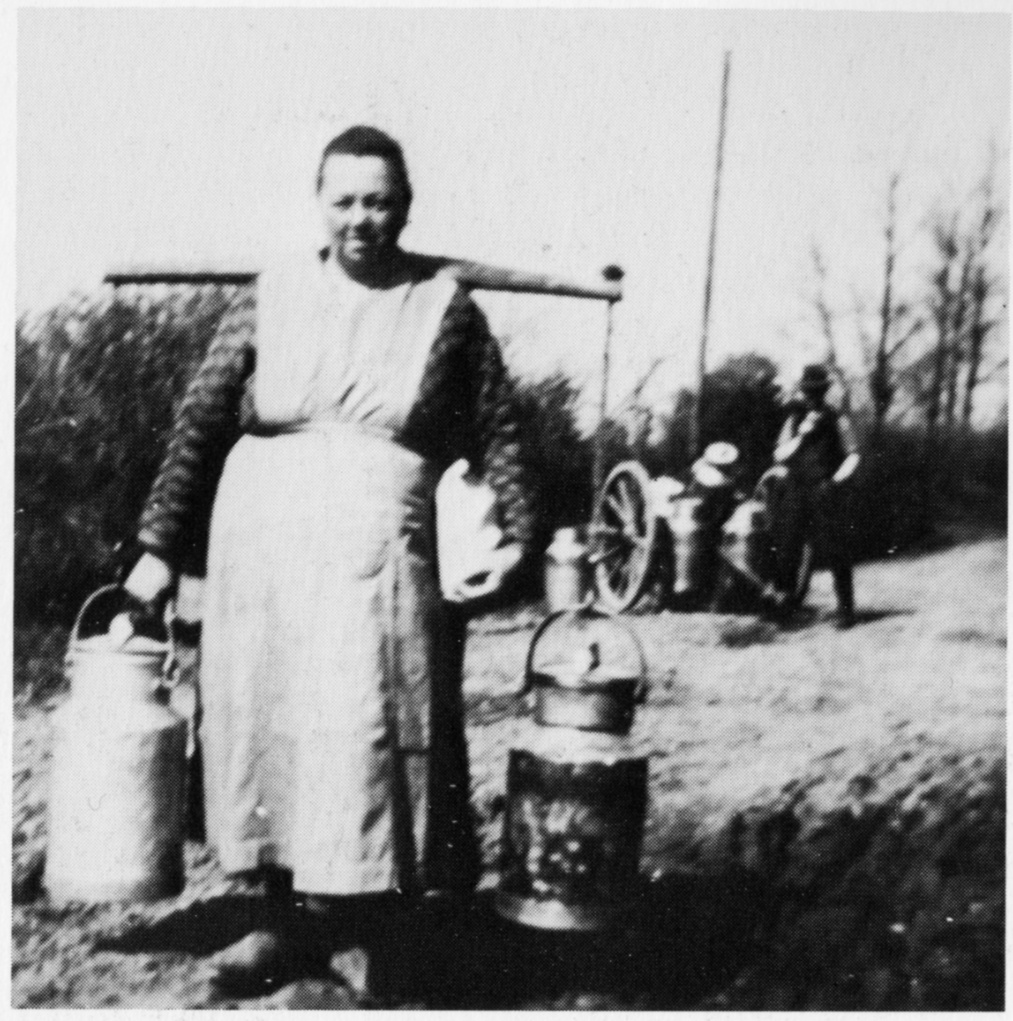
A Danish milk maid with shoulder yoke circa 1935

A milkmaid, milk maid, milkwoman, dairymaid, or dairywoman is a girl or woman who works with milk or cows. She milks cows and may prepare dairy products such as cream, butter, and cheese. The term milkmaid is not the female equivalent of milkman in the sense of one who delivers milk to the consumer; it is the female equivalent of milkman in the sense of cowman or dairyman.

In 1600s-1800s, English milkmaids sold milk wearing a yoke supporting two milk pails and vending vessels, and also decorated themselves for the London May Day procession.

== Cowpox ==
As a result of exposure to cowpox, which conveys a partial immunity to the disfiguring (and often fatal) disease smallpox, it was noticed by Edward Jenner that milkmaids lacked the scarred, pockmarked complexion common to smallpox survivors. This observation led to the development of the first vaccine.

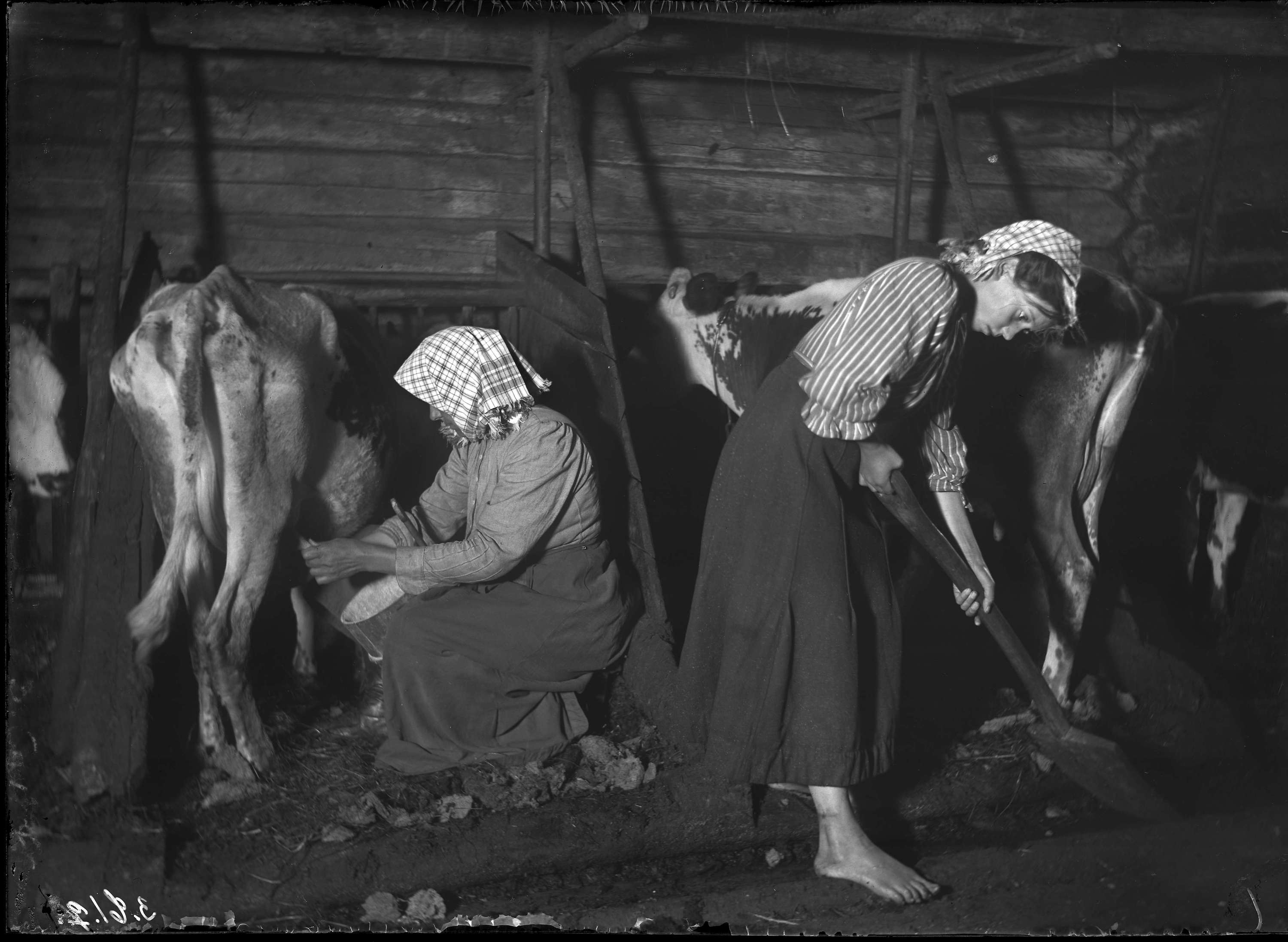
Milkmaid and dairy cattle in Mangskog, Sweden, 1911

== See also ==
- Milkman
