= Cell Block Tango =

Song from the 1975 musical "Chicago"

"Cell Block Tango" is a song from the 1975 musical Chicago, with music composed by John Kander and lyrics written by Fred Ebb. This song starred the six women accused of murder.

== Description ==
At the Cook County Jail women's annex, six women explain their presence in the jail, all of whom stand accused of killing their significant others. "He had it coming" is a refrain throughout the number, as each woman thinks her crime was justified. Each murder suspect is identified with a particular word that punctuates the song: "Pop! Six! Squish! Uh-uh! Cicero! Lipschitz!"

- "Pop": The first woman, Liz, states that she was driven to kill her husband Bernie when his bubble gum–popping habit triggered her misophonia: "I took a shotgun from the wall and fired two warning shots—into his head."
- "Six": The second, Annie Young, admits that after moving in with Ezekiel, a member of the Young family from Salt Lake City, and realizing that he is in fact a Mormon polygamist with six other wives (despite having claimed to be single during their courtship), she poisoned his drink with arsenic.
- "Squish": The third woman, June, explains that her husband Wilbur had threateningly accused her of having an affair with the milkman while she was cooking dinner and that when he charged her, she stabbed him to death, purportedly in self-defense: "He ran into my knife ten times." (The "squish" is presumably the sound of the knife entering his body, and the story is ambiguous as to whether or not she was having said affair.)
- "Uh-uh": The fourth woman, Katalin Hunyak (Helszinski in the film), insists that, in stark contrast to the others, she had no involvement in the crime she is accused of committing. She relates her story in Hungarian:
  What am I doing here? They say my famous lover held down my husband while I chopped off his head. But it's not true. I am innocent. I don't know why Uncle Sam says I did it. I tried to explain at the police station but they didn't understand me.
  Other than Velma, she is the only member of the sextet to reappear later in the musical; she eventually is convicted and hanged, setting up Roxie Hart's climactic trial.
- "Cicero": The fifth woman, Velma Kelly, one of the stars of the musical, relates that she caught her sister and vaudeville partner Veronica in an acrobatics maneuver from their act ("number 17: the spread eagle") with Velma's husband Charlie while Velma and Veronica were performing in the suburb of Cicero, Illinois. To maintain plausible deniability, she claims to have amnesia about what happens next but came to her senses as she was washing off the blood on her hands, strongly implying that she killed them both in a fit of blind rage in revenge for Charlie cheating on her by having sex with her sister.
- "Lipschitz": The sixth and final woman, Mona Lipschitz, admits to killing her husband Alvin after finding out that he was cheating on her with several women and at least one man ("Ruth, Gladys, Rosemary... and Irving!")

On Broadway, the song was originally performed by Chita Rivera as Velma Kelly, and Gwen Verdon as Roxie Hart, with Candy Brown, Cheryl Clark aka Cheryl A Clark, Graciela Daniele, Michon Peacock and Pamela Sousa. In the 2002 film, this musical number is performed by Catherine Zeta-Jones (as Velma Kelly), Susan Misner (as Liz), Denise Faye (as Annie), Deidre Goodwin (as June), Ekaterina Chtchelkanova (as Katalin Helinszki nicknamed the Hunyak), and Mýa (as Mona).

== Covers and external usage ==
The song has been covered, or otherwise used, in several shows or videos:

- In the Glamorous episode "Are You On The List?", the song was lip-synced by six drag queens, including Marco Mejia (portrayed by Miss Benny).
- In the Glee episode "Choke", the song was covered by main characters Santana, Brittany, Mercedes, Sugar, and Tina.
- Girls' Generation's Hyoyeon popularized the song in South Korea after performing in the dance reality show "Hit the stage".
- Child actors in the Broadway production of The Secret Garden performed the number as part of a 1992 AIDS benefit in New York City.
- Todrick Hall has parodied the song to make "Spell Block Tango" using Disney villains Captain Hook (as the master of ceremonies), Cruella De Vil, The Evil Queen, Ursula, Queen of Hearts, Scar (which he portrayed), and Maleficent. Hall also parodied the song as "Cell Black Django" using celebrities NeNe Leakes (as the master of ceremonies), Nicki Minaj, Rihanna, Solange Knowles, Beyoncé, internet meme "Sharkeisha" (which he portrayed), and Mariah Carey.
- In the Gotham episode "Let Them Eat Pie," Professor Pyg does his rendition of the song called the "Meat Pie Tango" at Sofia Falcone's charity event at the Falcone Home and School for Orphans.
- In the Crazy Ex-Girlfriend episode "I Want to Be Here," Rebecca Bunch attempts to lead a homage to the song in prison, but is unnerved by how depressing her fellow inmates stories are.
- In the Elsbeth second season finale "Ramen Holiday," Elsbeth Tascioni, after finding herself in prison, has a dream where her fellow prison-mates, murderers she had caught over the previous two seasons, perform a rendition of this song about Alex Modarian.
- In the 2026 Winter Olympics figure skating gala, Estonian Niina Petrõkina performed a number based on a rendition of this song, with fellow skaters Ilia Malinin, Cha Jun-hwan, and Tim Dieck performing cameos as the male victims. She has also performed the number at the European and World Championships gala events.

== Certifications ==
Certifications for "Cell Block Tango"
| Region | Certification | Certified units/sales |
|---|---|---|
| United Kingdom (BPI) film version, performed by Catherine Zeta-Jones | Silver | 200,000^{‡} |
^{‡} Sales+streaming figures based on certification alone.
