= Milkman joke =

Jokes about women having sex with house visitors

In English-speaking culture, a milkman joke is a joke cycle exploiting fear of adultery and mistaken paternity, insinuating that a woman had cheated on her husband with the milkman.

This class of jokes has its roots in the early part of the 20th century, prior to the regular availability of milk in supermarkets. At that time, milk in glass bottles was delivered directly to customers' houses by milkmen, generally in the morning. Typically, men were the main financial supporters of their families, while women tended to remain at home to care for their children and house. As the milkman would visit the home at a time when the husband would be away at work, this created an opportune situation for adultery.

Often times, a different profession will replace the milkman in various jokes. For instance, in Spain, 'milkman' jokes are told about butaneros: persons who deliver butane, bottled fuel gas, to households without a pipeline gas hookup. Similar jokes referring to other professions, such as postmen, plumbers, pizza delivery drivers, and swimming pool cleaners, are also known.

== In arts and entertainment ==
- In the musical Chicago, 6 women sing about killing their husbands in the song Cell Block Tango. One explains that her husband had accused her of having an affair with the milkman and that when he charged her, she stabbed him to death, purportedly in self-defense.
- Monty Python's Flying Circus had a short Seduced Milkmen sketch, where a lonely housewife lures the milkman into her house and up many stairs, then shoves him in a room with nine other milkmen, many of whom are very old (and two skeletons wearing milkmen uniforms) and locks the door.
- In the Goofy cartoon "Father's Day Off" (1953), Goofy answers the door to the milkman to deliver the milk. However, unbeknownst to the milkman, he kisses Goofy, thinking it is his wife. This implies that Mrs. Goof has been having an affair with the milkman.
- An entire episode of Father Ted ("Speed 3") was based upon the joke.
- In Blackadder, in the third season, in the episode Dish and Dishonesty, Edmund Blackadder mocks Prime Minister Pitt the Younger by suggesting who would campaign with his party during a byelection, among them Pitt the Glint in the Milkman's Eye.
- In the South Park episode "Insecurity," the male inhabitants believe the local delivery man is having affairs with their wives and one of the elder inhabitants of the city reveals that their situation was the same as his during his era with milkmen.
- The title of the Eugene O'Neill drama The Iceman Cometh plays on this type of joke.
- Benny Hill had a chart-topping hit with "Ernie (The Fastest Milkman in the West)." Hill makes a key adjustment in that the target of Ernie's affections is widowed.
- The Raconteurs' 2008 rock song "Carolina Drama," a murder ballad surrounding ambiguous paternity, ends with a reference to the milkman trope ("If you must know the truth about the tale / Go and ask the milkman").
