= Milk delivery =

Delivery service dedicated to supplying milk

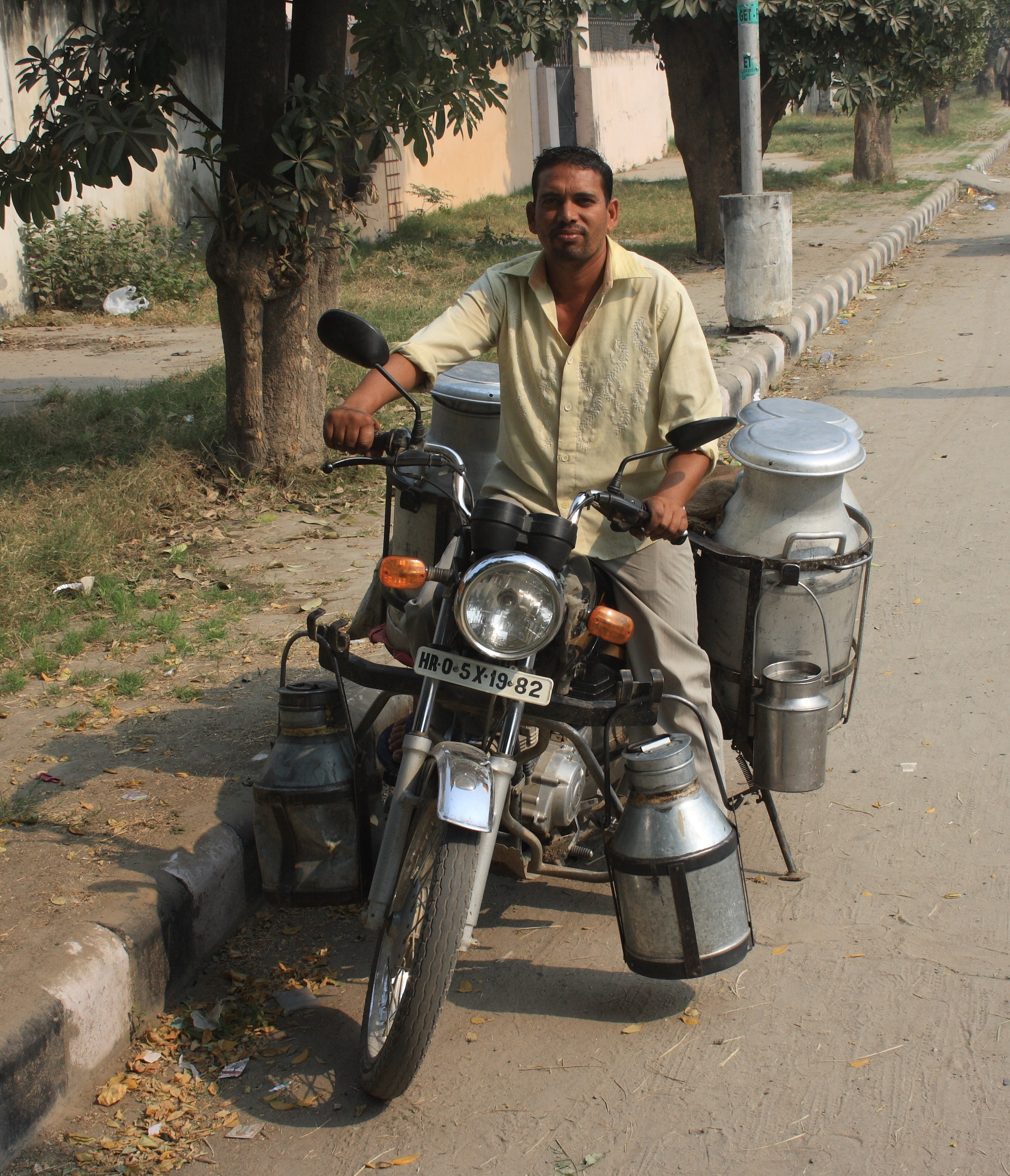
An Indian milkman on his motorbike

Milk delivery is a delivery service dedicated to supplying milk, typically in bottles or cartons, to customers' homes. This service is performed by a milkman, milkwoman, or milk deliverer. (In contrast, a cowman or milkmaid tends to cows.) The delivery route is a milk route or milk run.

Home milk delivery was common in many countries until the second half of the 20th century, when modern supermarkets and household refrigeration made it possible for consumers to buy and store milk on demand. Today, milk delivery still exists as a niche market in some countries.

== Delivery ==
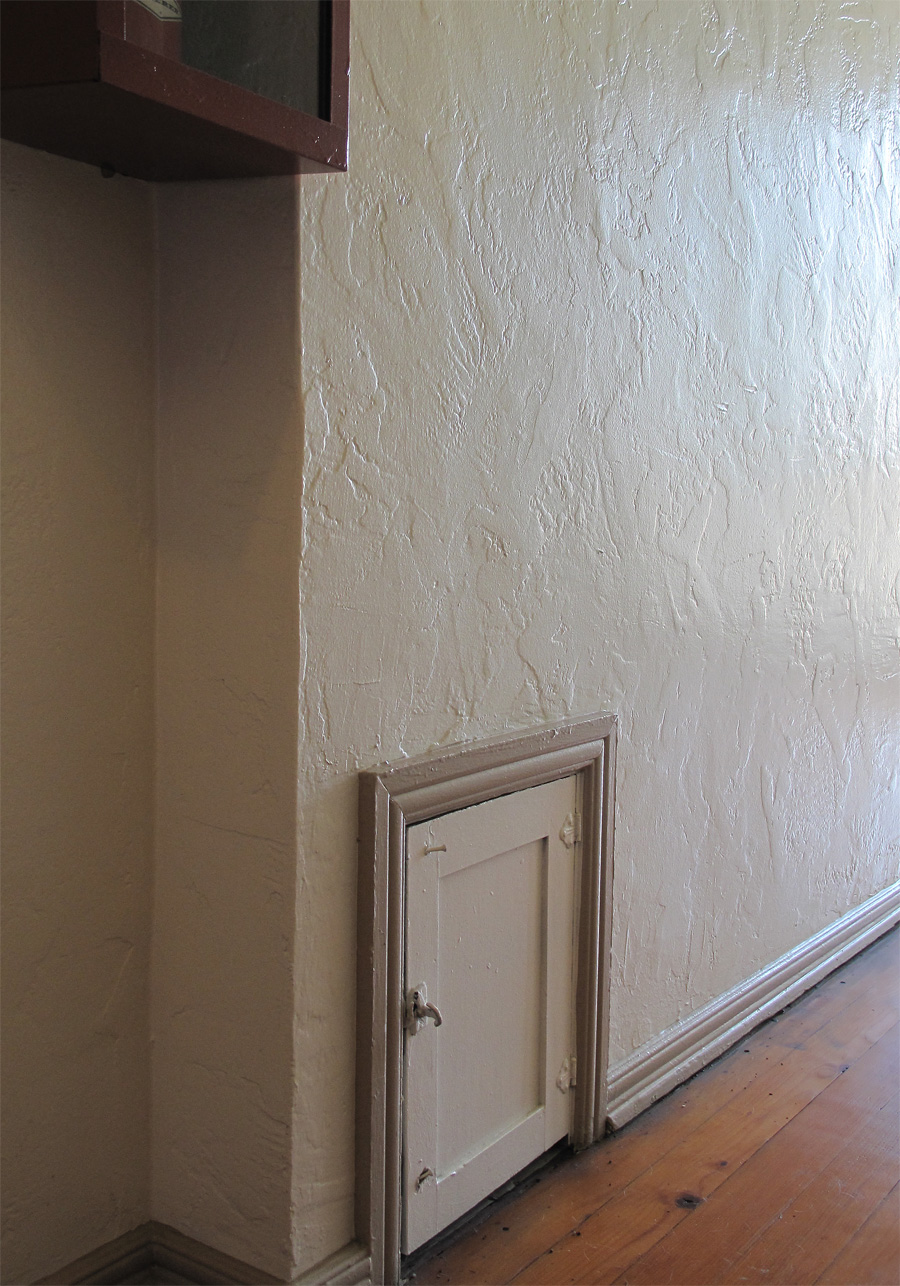
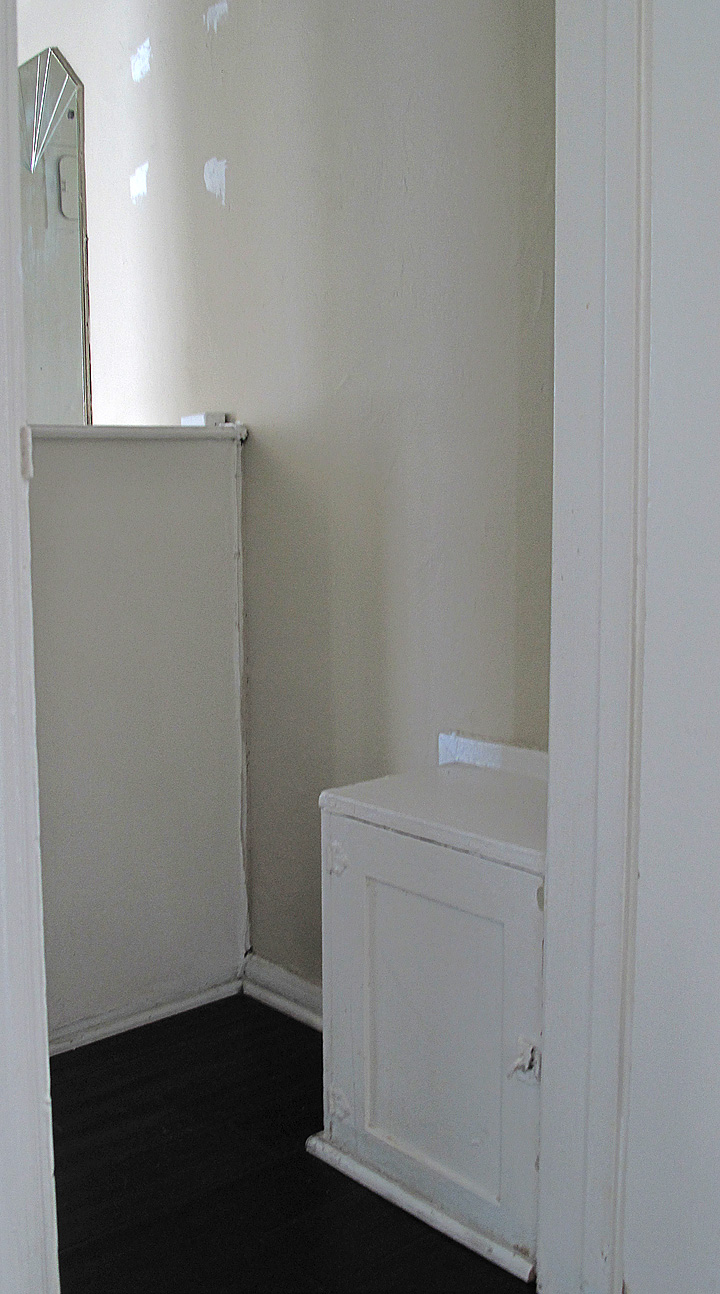
A 1920s apartment milk delivery door, from outside and from inside.

In some countries, when a lack of good refrigeration meant that milk would quickly spoil, milk was delivered to houses daily. Before milk bottles were available, milkmen took churns on their rounds and filled the customers' jugs by dipping a measure into the churn. Due to improved packaging and the spread of refrigerators in private homes, the need for milk delivery decreased from the latter part of the twentieth century. These advances contributed to the decline or loss of services in many localities, from deliveries daily to just three days a week or less in others.

Milk is usually delivered in the morning. Milk deliverers often also deliver products such as butter, cream, cheese, eggs, meat and vegetables.

In some areas, apartments and houses have small milk-delivery doors, latched but not locked, opening into small wooden cabinets built into the exterior wall of the house, with a door also on the inside, allowing groceries or milk to be put in the cabinet by the deliverer and removed by the resident.

== Vehicles ==
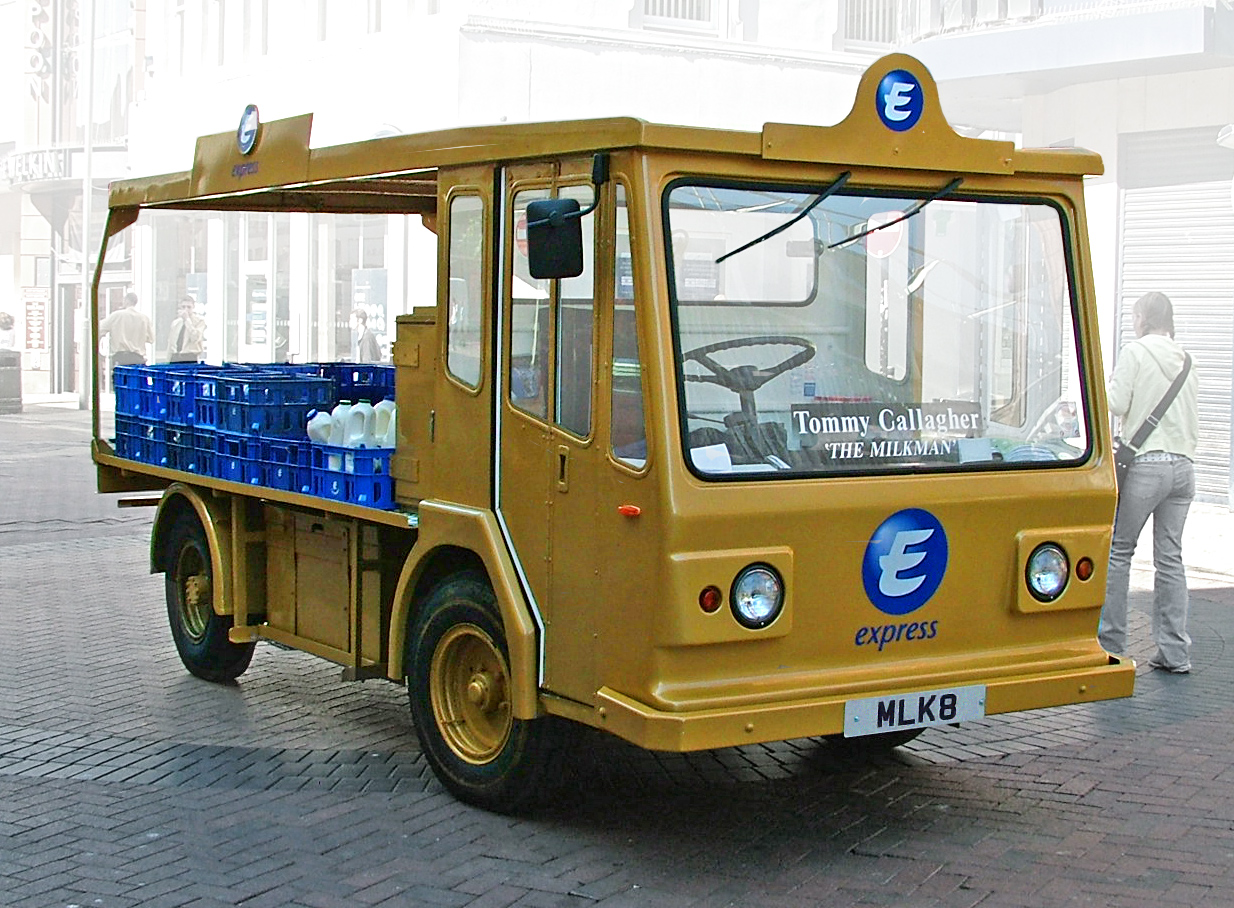
A milk float

Horse-drawn vehicles were used for local delivery from the inception of the first milk round in about 1860. These were still seen in Britain and parts of the United States in the mid-twentieth century, until replaced by motorized vehicles. First introduced in 1889, battery vehicles saw expanded use in 1931, and by 1967 had given Britain the largest electric vehicle fleet in the world.

== Around the world ==
=== Americas ===
Sales of fluid milk products in USA, by type of outlet, 1954–1971
Year	Home delivered	Away-from-home	Stores
1954	54.0%	13.3%	32.7%
1955	52.8%	13.4%	33.8%
1956	50.4%	14.5%	35.1%
1957	48.5%	14.4%	37.1%
1958	46.7%	14.5%	38.8%
1959	45.5%	14.6%	39.9%
1960	43.8%	15.2%	41.0%
1961	42.0%	15.0%	43.0%
1962	40.0%	14.9%	45.1%
1963	37.0%	15.6%	47.4%
1964	34.3%	16.3%	49.4%
1965	33.9%	16.6%	49.5%
1966	30.5%	17.0%	52.5%
1967	28.3%	17.4%	54.3%
1968	25.9%	17.5%	56.6%
1969	24.5%	17.4%	58.1%
1970	21.9%	17.4%	60.7%
1971	19.3%	17.4%	63.3%

In 1954, home delivery accounted for 54% of milk sales, but by 1971 that had dropped to only 19.3%, and by 1975 it had decreased further to 6.9 percent of total sales.

By 2005, about 0.4% of consumers in the United States had their milk delivered, and a handful of companies had sprung up to offer the service. Some U.S. dairies have been delivering milk for about 100 years, with interest continuing to increase in the 2010s as part of the local food movement. During the 2020 coronavirus outbreak, some remaining milkmen saw demand increase suddenly (similar to other grocery delivery services) due to concerns about the infection risk involved with shopping in stores.

=== Asia ===
In India, milk is usually delivered using milk churns, a practice that has ceased in western countries. On the road, they are put on any kind of vehicle. In big cities such as Mumbai, milk churns are often transported in luggage compartments in local trains.

In the Philippines, the milkman or milkmaid is called lechero, as in Spanish-speaking countries. The tradition stemmed from the community production of carabao milk, which the lechero delivers fresh to their designated barangay (village). The lechero heritage used to be widely practiced in the country but declined after the introduction of store-bought milk during the American period. Nowadays, only a few communities have lecheros, notably in Nueva Ecija province, the milk capital of the Philippines.

=== Oceania ===
In Australia, the delivery vehicle was usually a small petrol or diesel truck with a covered milk-tray. In hotter areas, this tray is usually insulated.

In New Zealand, milk deliveries used horses until the 1960s, when trucks largely took over. Horses were still used for delivery into the 1970s in a few small areas. Originally, people paid by leaving money in the bottles, but later, payments were made using tokens, usually bought at a local dairy. Home milk deliveries died out in the 1990s after the deregulation of the milk industry, where supermarkets and other stores were permitted to sell milk.

=== Europe ===
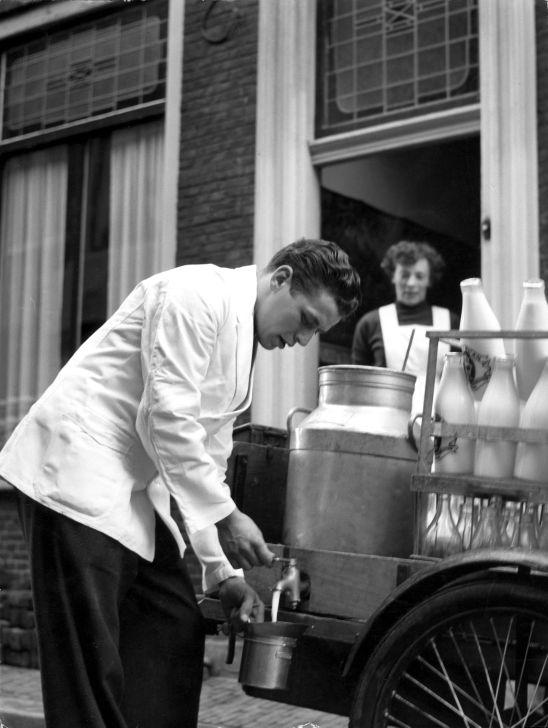
Dutch milkman in Haarlem, 1956

Milkmen appeared in Britain around 1860, when the first railways allowed fresh milk to arrive in cities from the countryside. By 1880, the milk was delivered in bottles. By 1975, 94% of milk was in glass bottles, but in 1990, supermarkets started offering plastic and carton containers, reducing bottled milk from 94% to 3% by 2016. In the 20th century, milk delivery in urban areas of Europe has been carried out from an electric vehicle called a milk float.

== Cultural impact ==
The comedy films The Milkman (1950) starring Donald O'Connor, and The Early Bird (1965), starring Norman Wisdom, portrayed the profession in the US and UK respectively.

Tevye the Dairyman (Tevye der milkhiker) is the fictional pious Jewish narrator and protagonist of a series of short stories by Sholem Aleichem, and various adaptations of them, the most famous being the stage/film musical Fiddler on the Roof.

Stephen King's short story "Morning Deliveries (Milkman No. 1)" (in the horror anthology Skeleton Crew (1985)), concerns a milkman who kills people by leaving "surprises" (including poison, toxic gas, and venomous spiders) in their milk cans.

The title of the pop hit "No Milk Today" (1966) by the British band Herman's Hermits comes from notes left for the milkman. The title symbolizes the singer's recent breakup with his love interest who has just moved out of his house.

The British comedian Benny Hill, himself a former milkman, had a hit novelty song called "Ernie (The Fastest Milkman In The West)" (1971).

Ella Mae Morse had a US top 10 hit with "Milkman, Keep Those Bottles Quiet", from the film Broadway Rhythm (1944).

The (unnamed) milkwoman was an occasional character in British sitcom Open All Hours, the object of Granville's desire. Despite working early mornings just as Granville did, she was also a part-time university student and a divorcee, representing aspirations of a life lived beyond the terraced streets of the local neighborhood.

Episode 3 of the third series of television comedy series Father Ted is titled "Speed 3" and centers around the lustful behavior of milkman Pat Mustard, Ted's feud with him, and the tragic outcome.

In Raymond Briggs' graphic novel Ethel and Ernest, based on the true story of Mr. Briggs' parents, Ernest Briggs, Raymond's father, is described as being a milkman for the R.A.C.S.

== Gallery ==
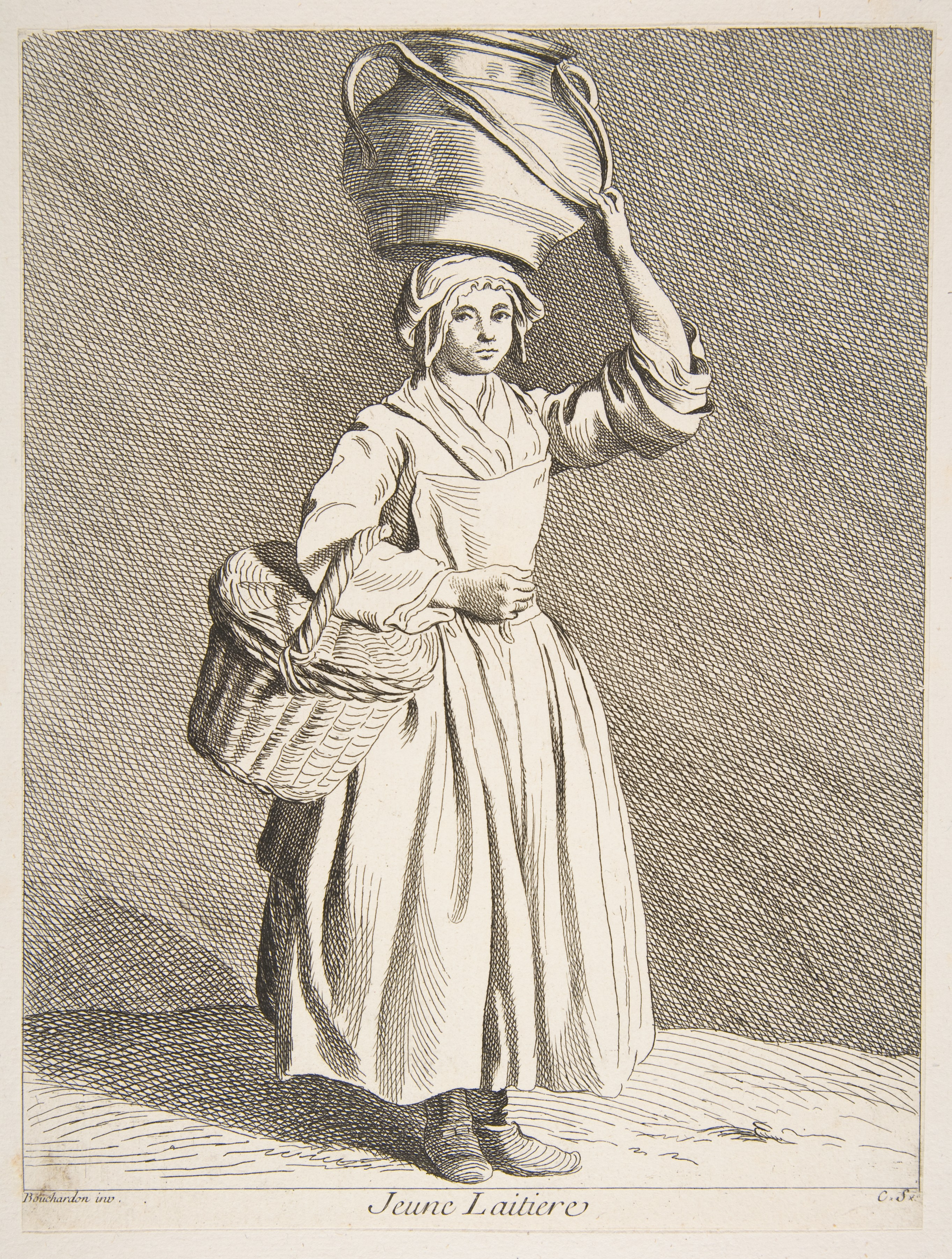
16th century milk transport with churn and basket

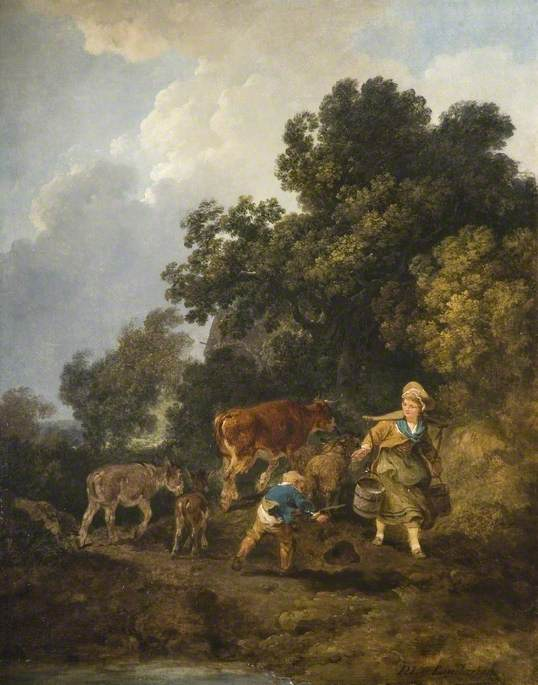
18th century milkmaid travelling with yoke and carrying pails, Philip James de Loutherbourg

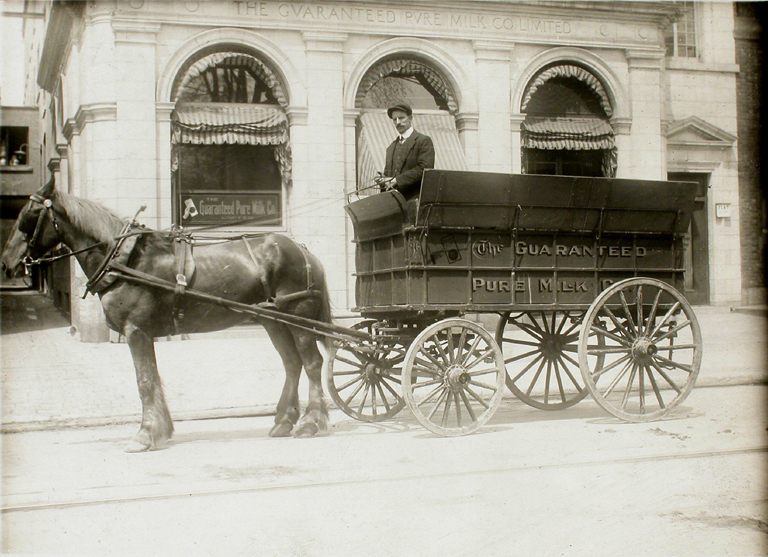
Guaranteed Pure Milk Company delivery wagon No. 36, Montreal, QC, about 1910

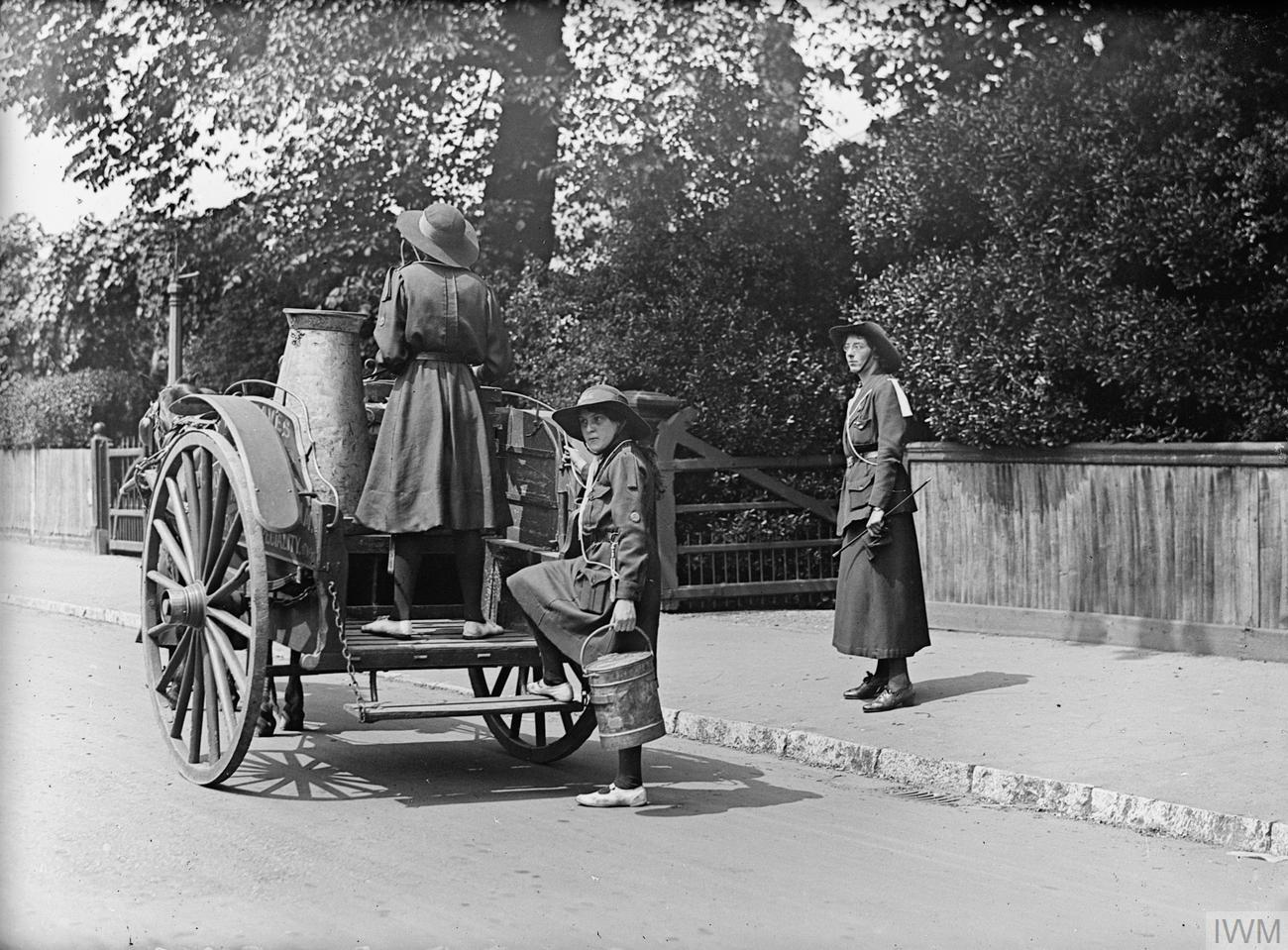
Girl Guides delivering milk in the United Kingdom during World War I

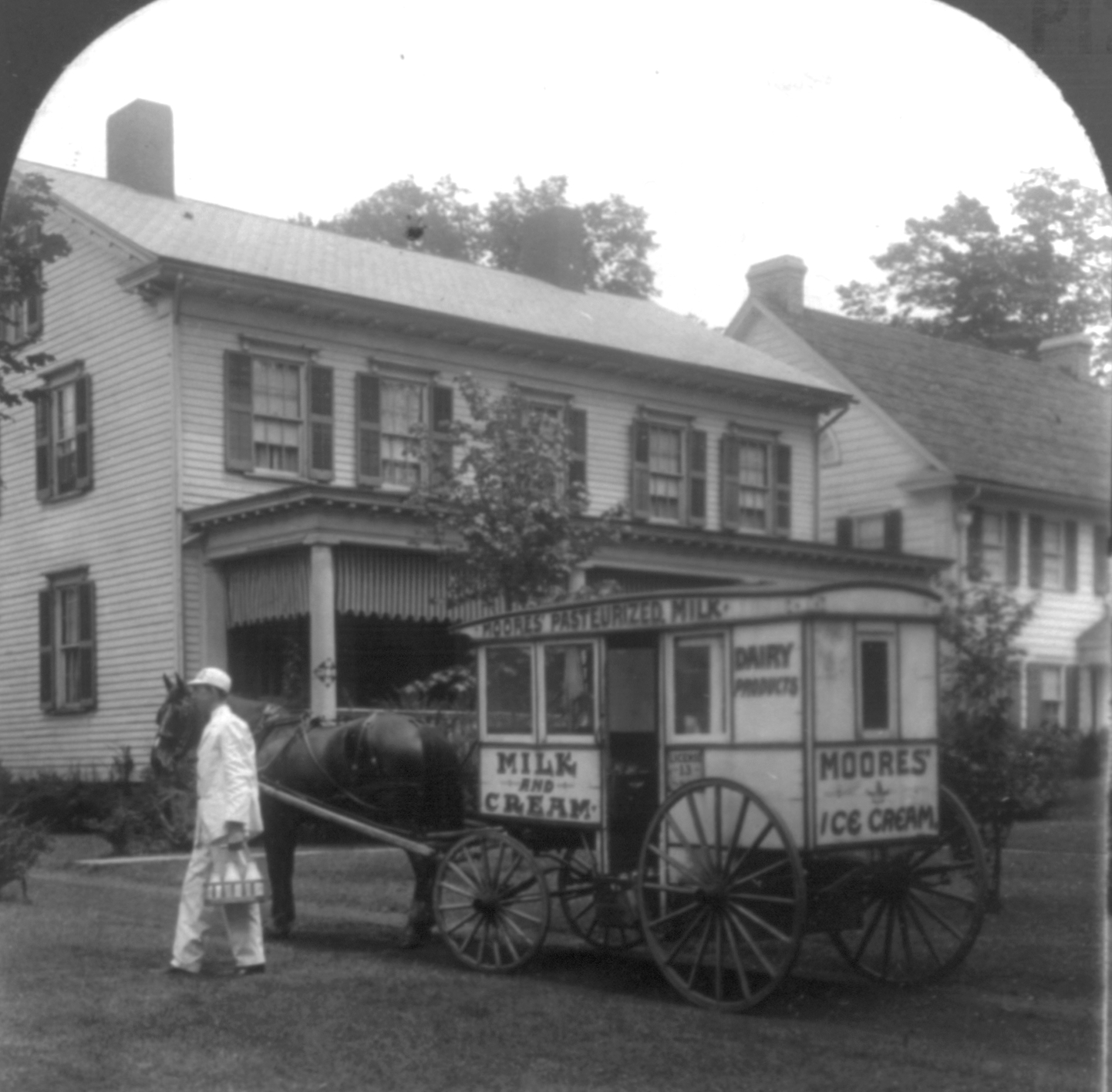
A U.S. milkman with a delivery wagon, 1925

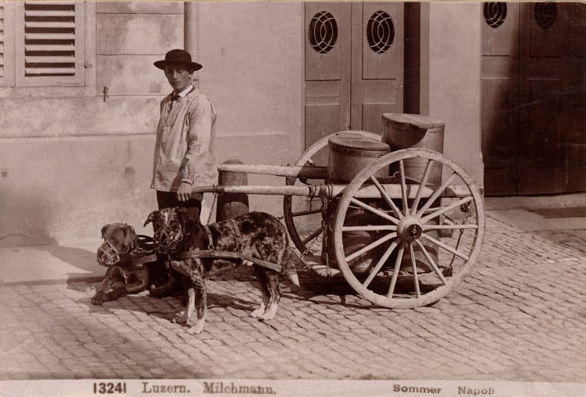
Milkman in Lucerne, Switzerland, before 1914

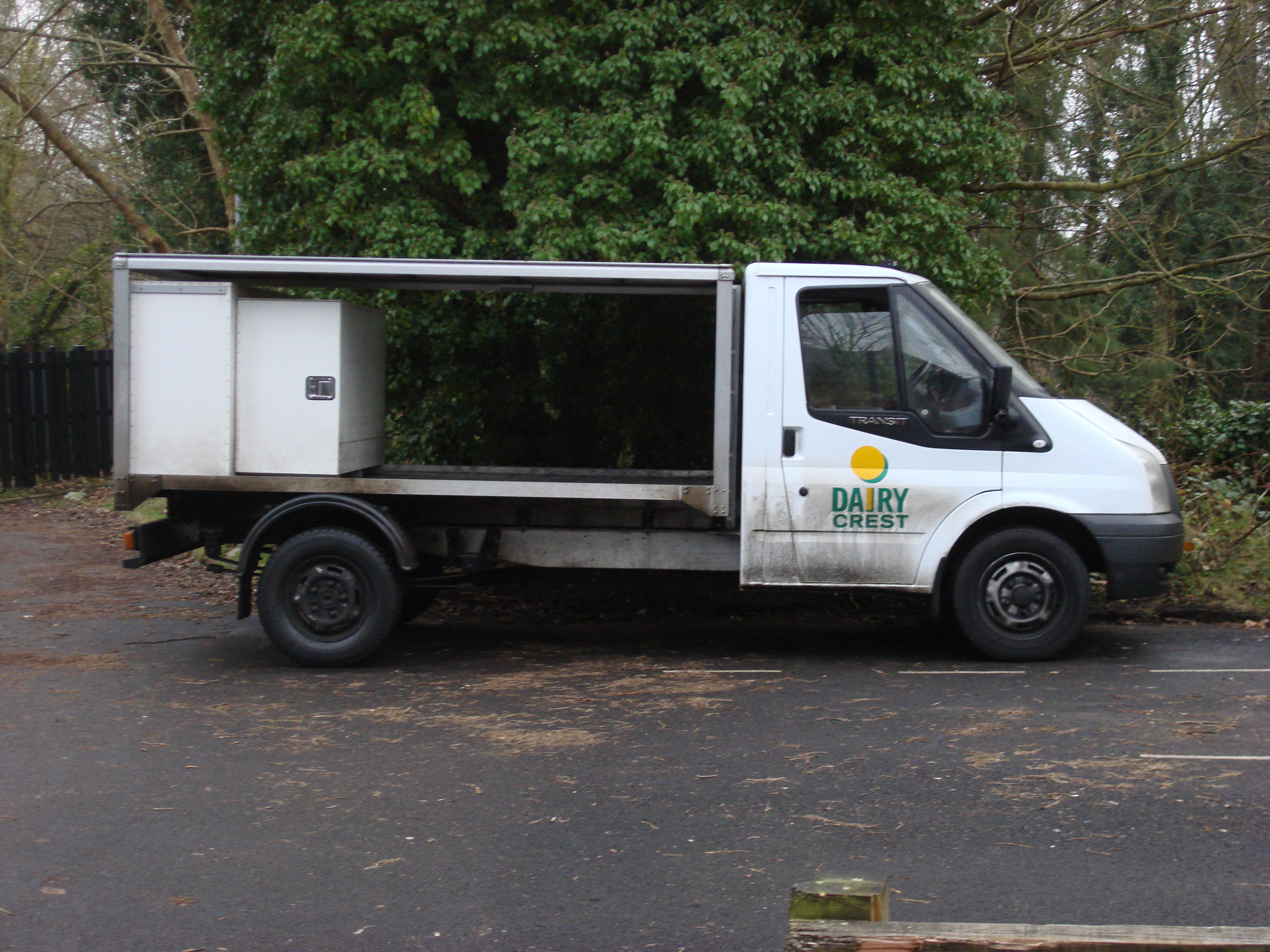
A British milk float in 2007

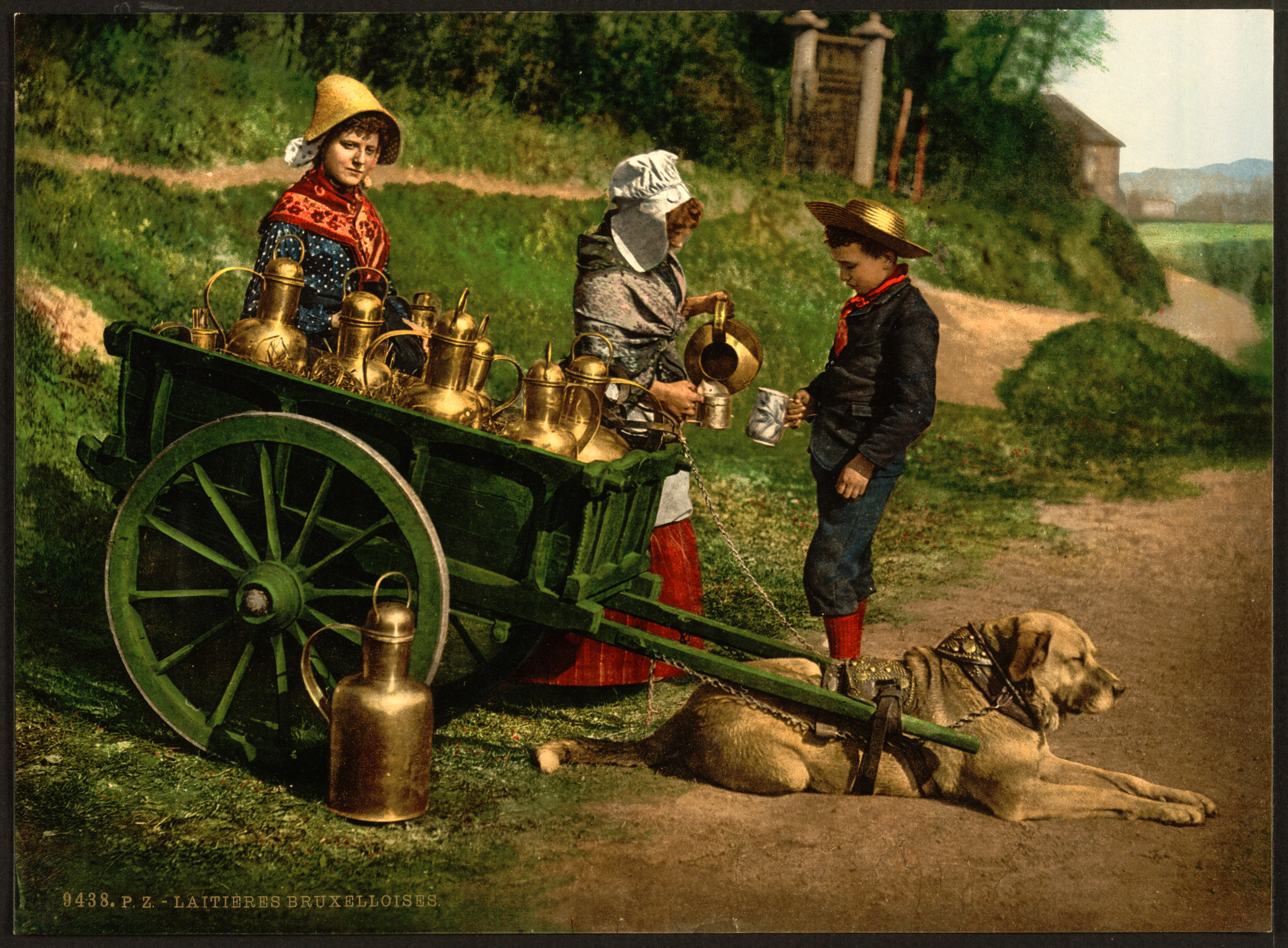
A photochrom from the late 19th century showing two peddlers selling milk from a dogcart near Brussels, Belgium

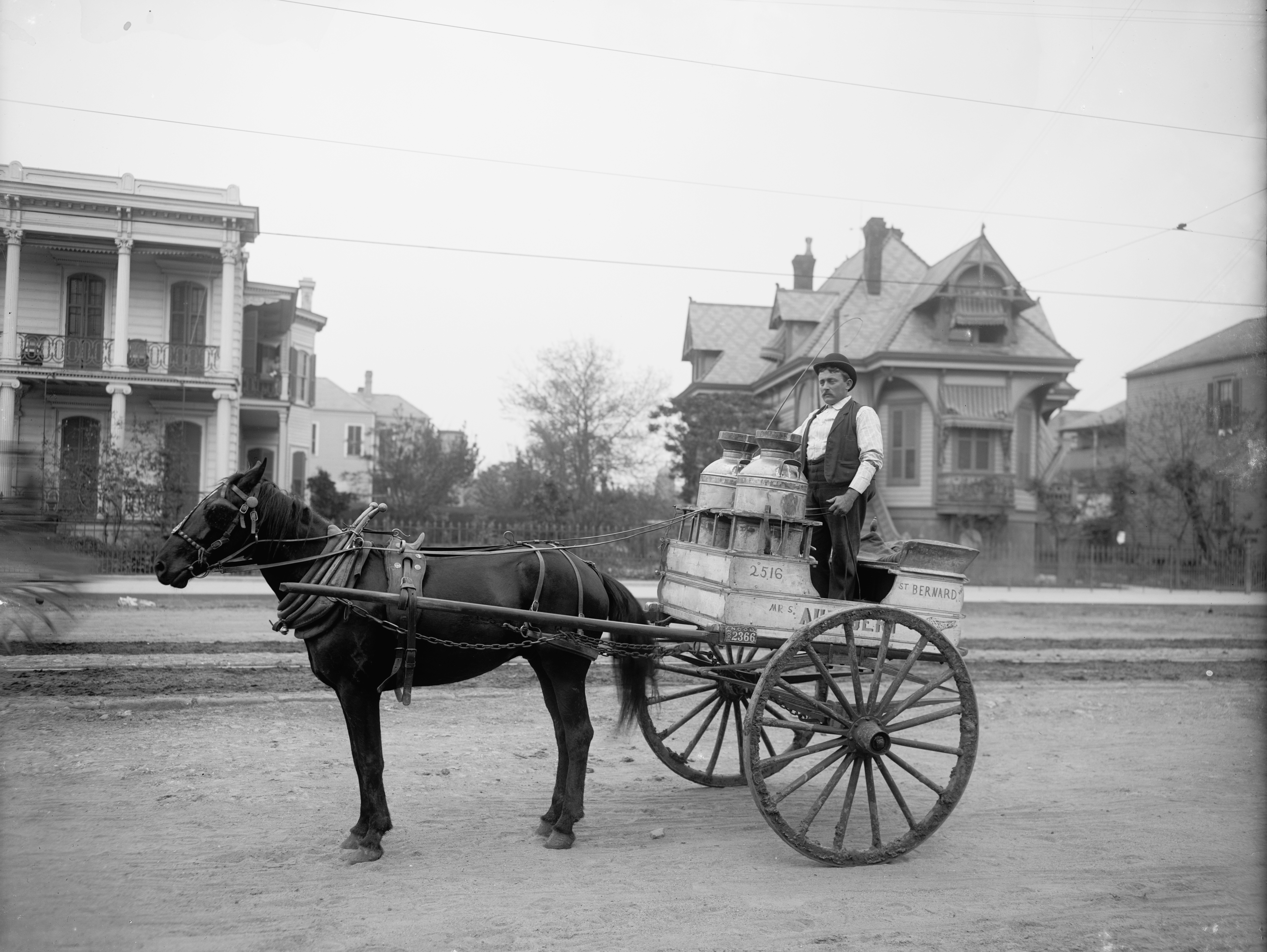
New Orleans milk cart, around 1903

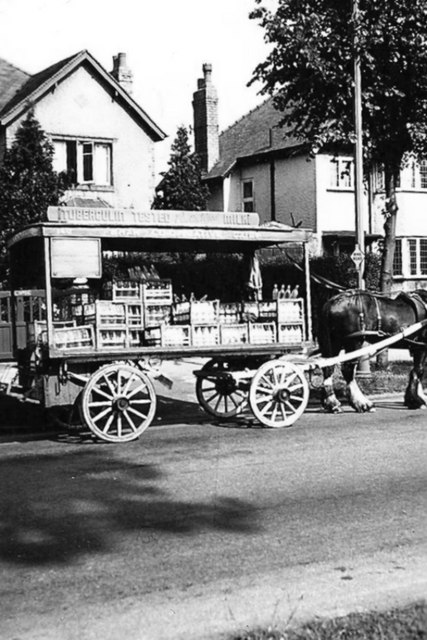
Milk delivery in 1952

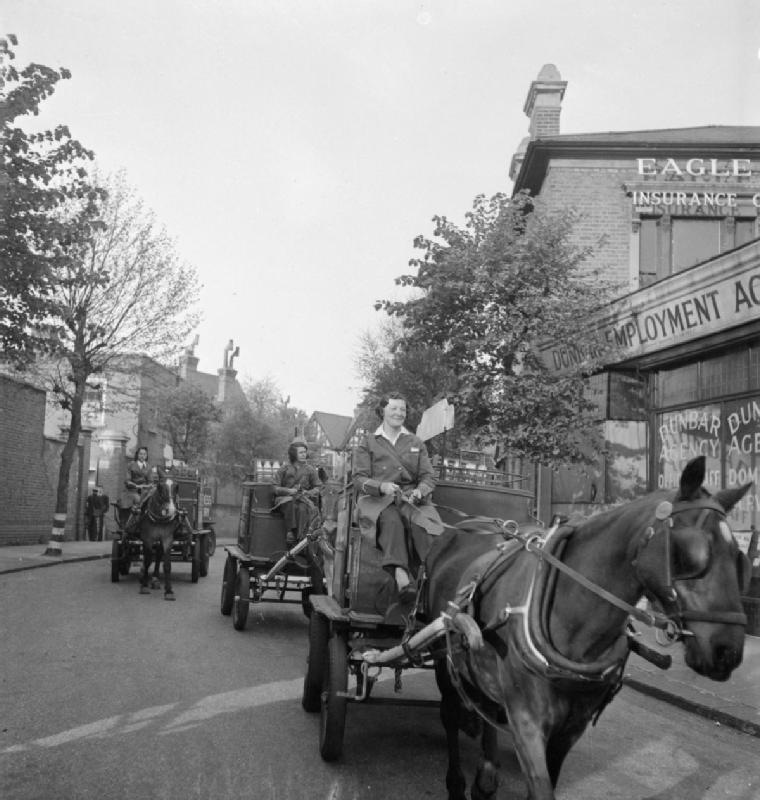
Women deliver the milk in wartime Britain, 1942

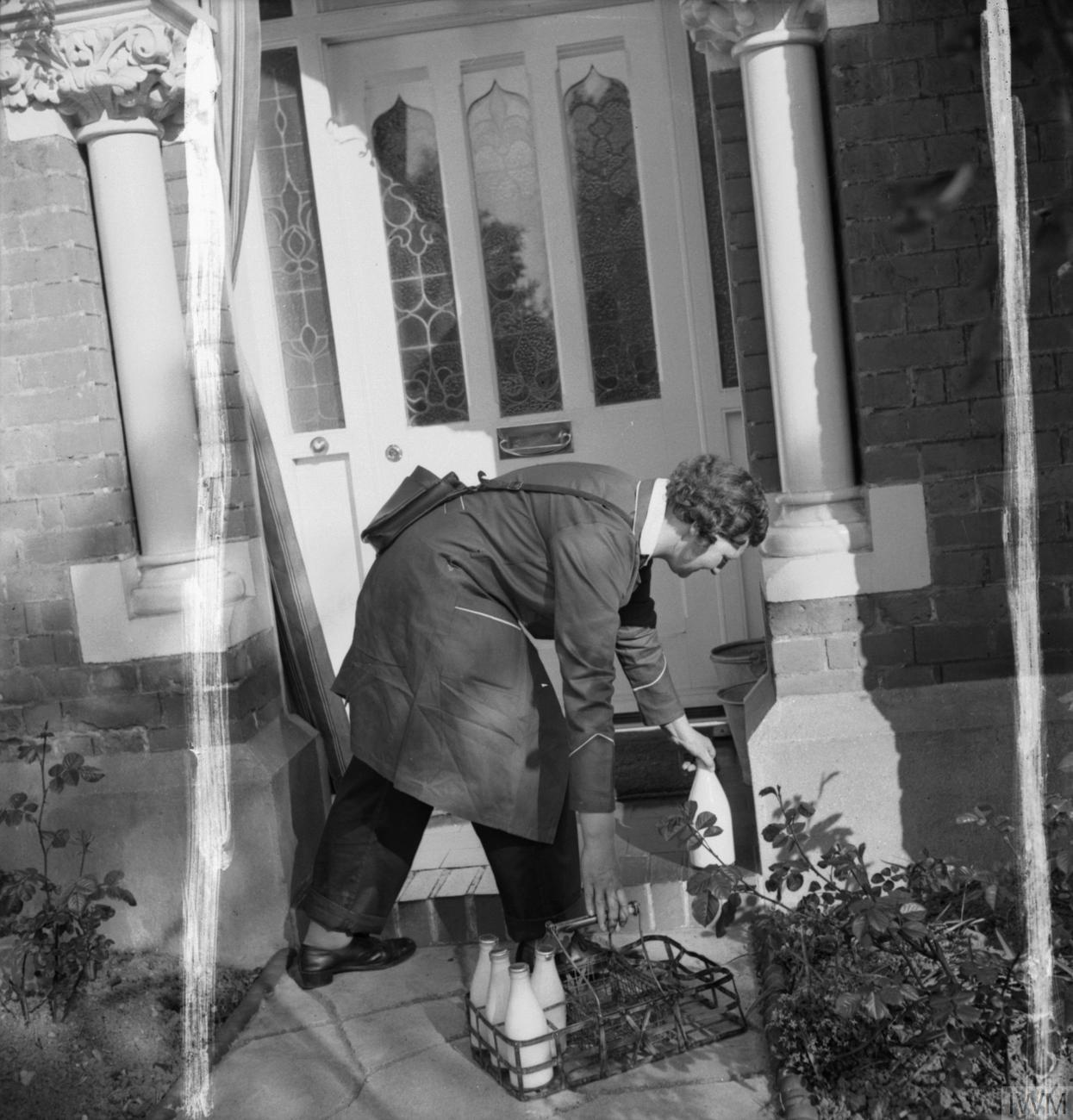
Women deliver the milk in wartime Britain, 1942

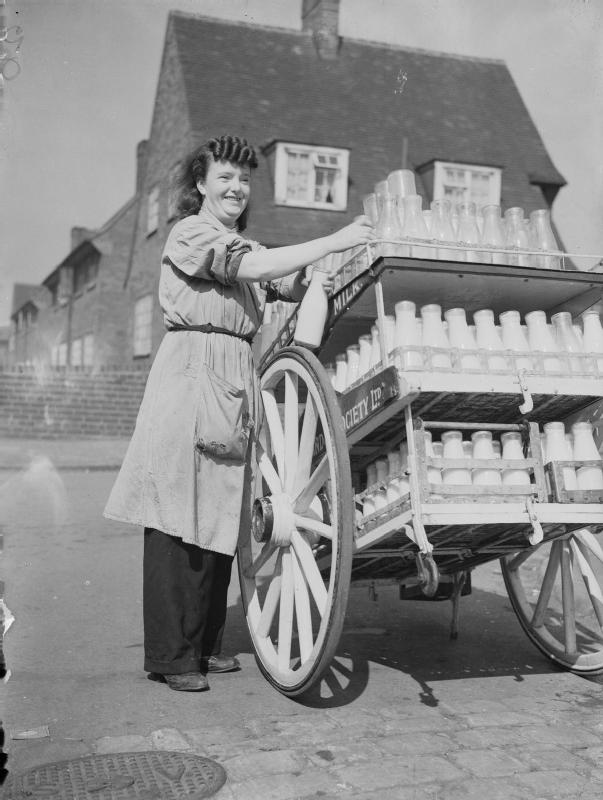
Women deliver the milk in wartime Leeds, 1942

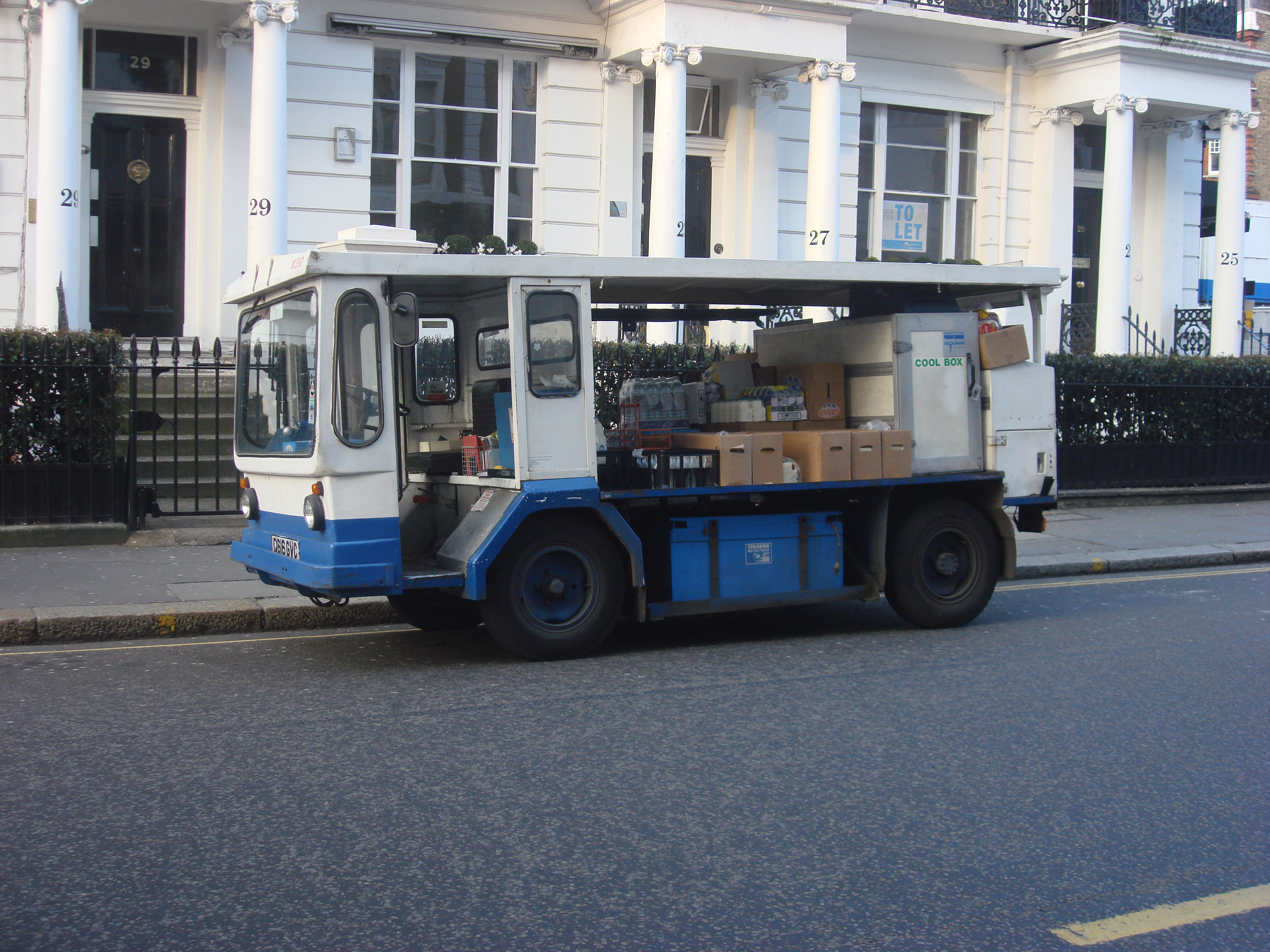
Milk float in South Kensington in 2009

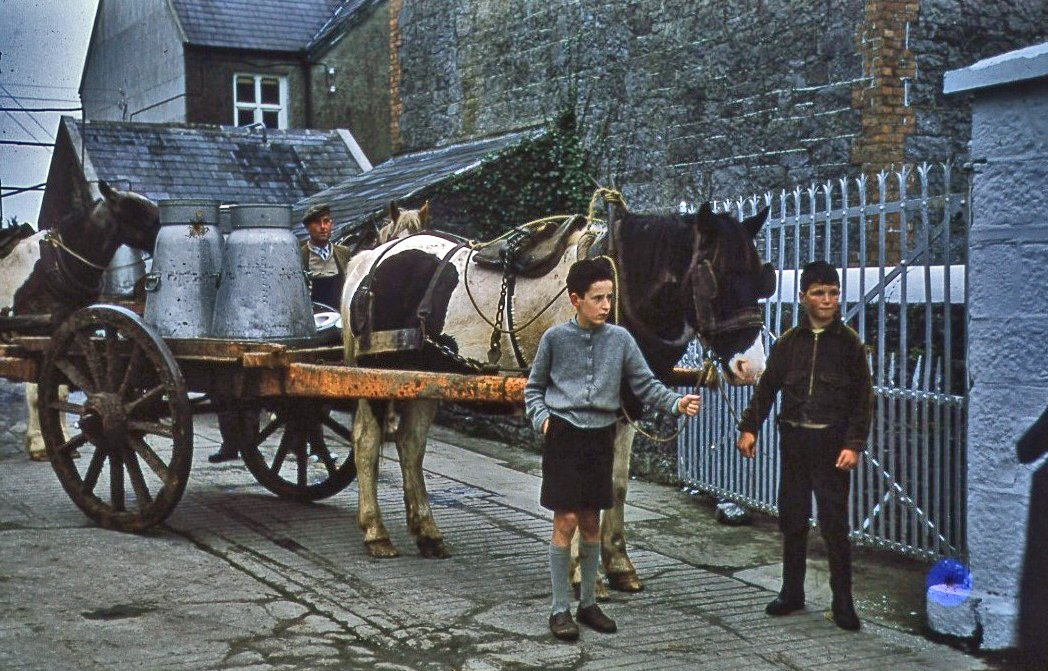
Irish boys and milk cart in 1962

== See also ==
- Milkman joke
- Yakult lady
- Milkmaid
