= Carrying pole =

Yoke of wood or bamboo used by people to carry a load

Chinese name
- Traditional Chinese: 擔杖
- Simplified Chinese: 担杖
Transcriptions
Standard Mandarin
- Hanyu Pinyin: dànzhàng

Alternative Chinese name
- Traditional Chinese: 擔挑
- Simplified Chinese: 担挑
Transcriptions
Standard Mandarin
- Hanyu Pinyin: dāntiāo

Second alternative Chinese name
- Traditional Chinese: 扁擔
- Simplified Chinese: 扁担
Transcriptions
Standard Mandarin
- Hanyu Pinyin: biǎndan

Vietnamese name
- Vietnamese: đòn gánh, đòn triêng

Japanese name
- Kanji: 天秤棒
Transcriptions
- Romanization: tenbinbō

Indonesian name
- Indonesian: pikulan

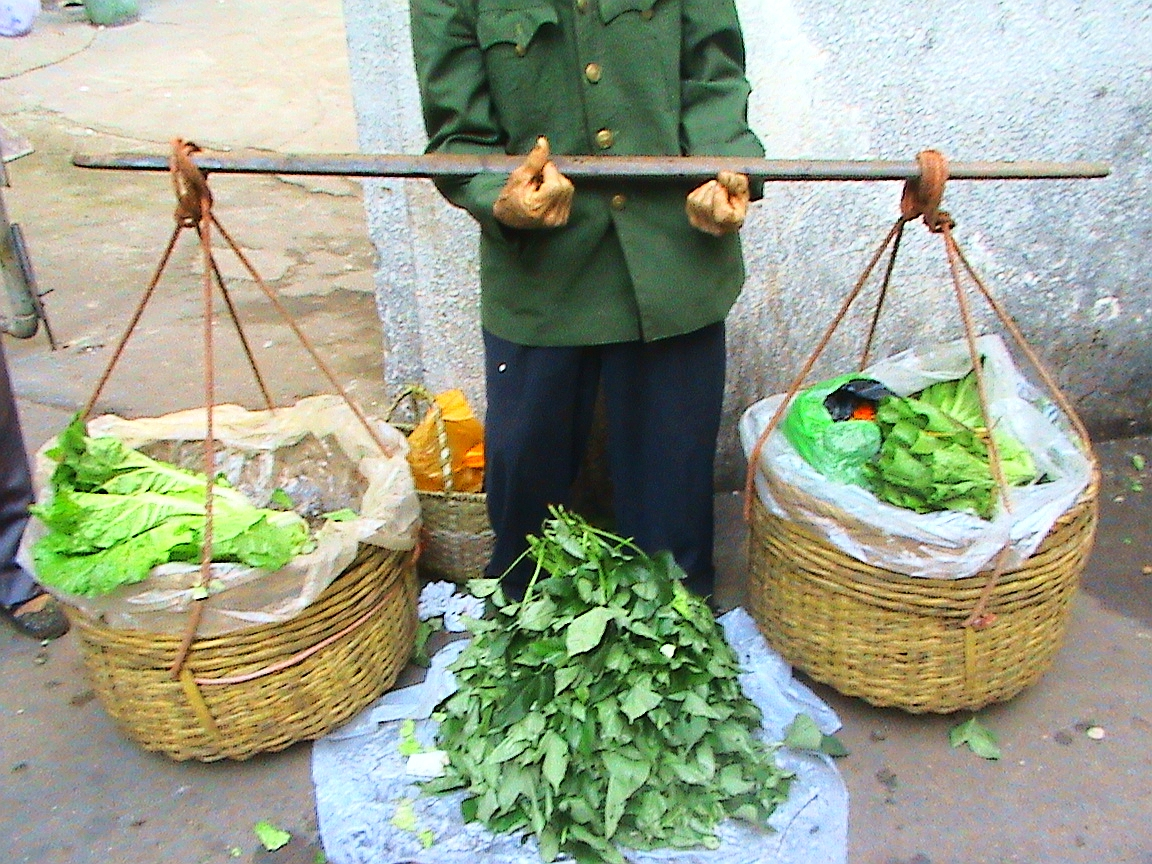
A wooden carrying pole in Haikou, Hainan Province, China.

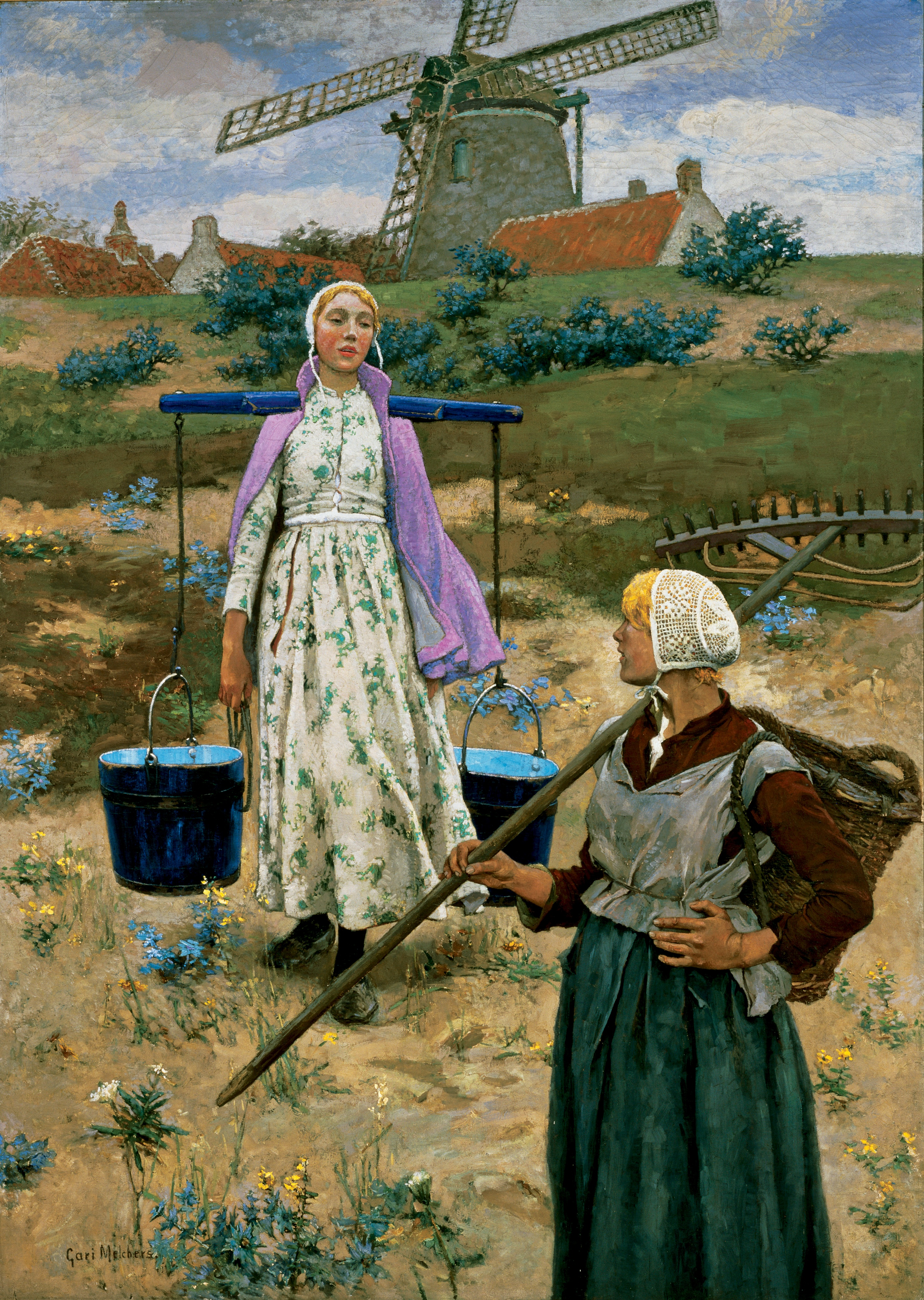
A milkmaid walking with a shoulder yoke, shown with another female farmworker carrying a rake and a wicker backpack, painting by Gari Melchers

A carrying pole, also called a shoulder pole, poldier, or a milkmaid's yoke, is a yoke of wood or bamboo, used by people to carry a load. This piece of equipment is used in one of two basic ways:

- A single person balances the yoke over one shoulder, with an evenly distributed load being suspended from each end.
- Two people support the yoke by resting it on a shoulder, with the load suspended from the centre of the yoke.

The basic design is a wood or bamboo yoke, usually tapered. From each end of the yoke, a load of equal mass is suspended. The load may be a basket of goods, pail of milk, water or other liquid, suspended on rope. The load may be hung directly from the yoke, without any rope.

The individual carries the device by balancing the yoke upon one or both shoulders. The Western milkmaid's yoke is fitted over both shoulders. However, the East Asian type is carried on one shoulder. This allows the wearer to orient the yoke along the path of travel, in order to more easily navigate crowded areas.

== History ==
It is still widely used in East Asia, and was previously used in the Western world, in particular by milkmaids. It was once part of the European culture, and was subsequently brought to Australia and the United States. It was also commonly used in Sri Lanka, where it was called Pingo. There are early 19th century postcards from Ceylon with Pingo Carriers.

In ancient Greece, it was called asilla (ἄσιλλα) or anaphoron (ἀνάφορον) and was a wooden pole or yoke carried by a person, either across both shoulders or, more commonly, on one shoulder and used for transporting burdens.

== Types ==
=== Canoe ===
Many canoes include a thwart shaped like a yoke to aid in carrying the boat. The gunwales of the inverted canoe rest upon the ends of the yoke, which is normally positioned slightly ahead of the centre of gravity of the vessel. This allows the bow to tip slightly upward when being transported, giving the carrier a view in the direction of travel when being portaged.

=== East Asian ===
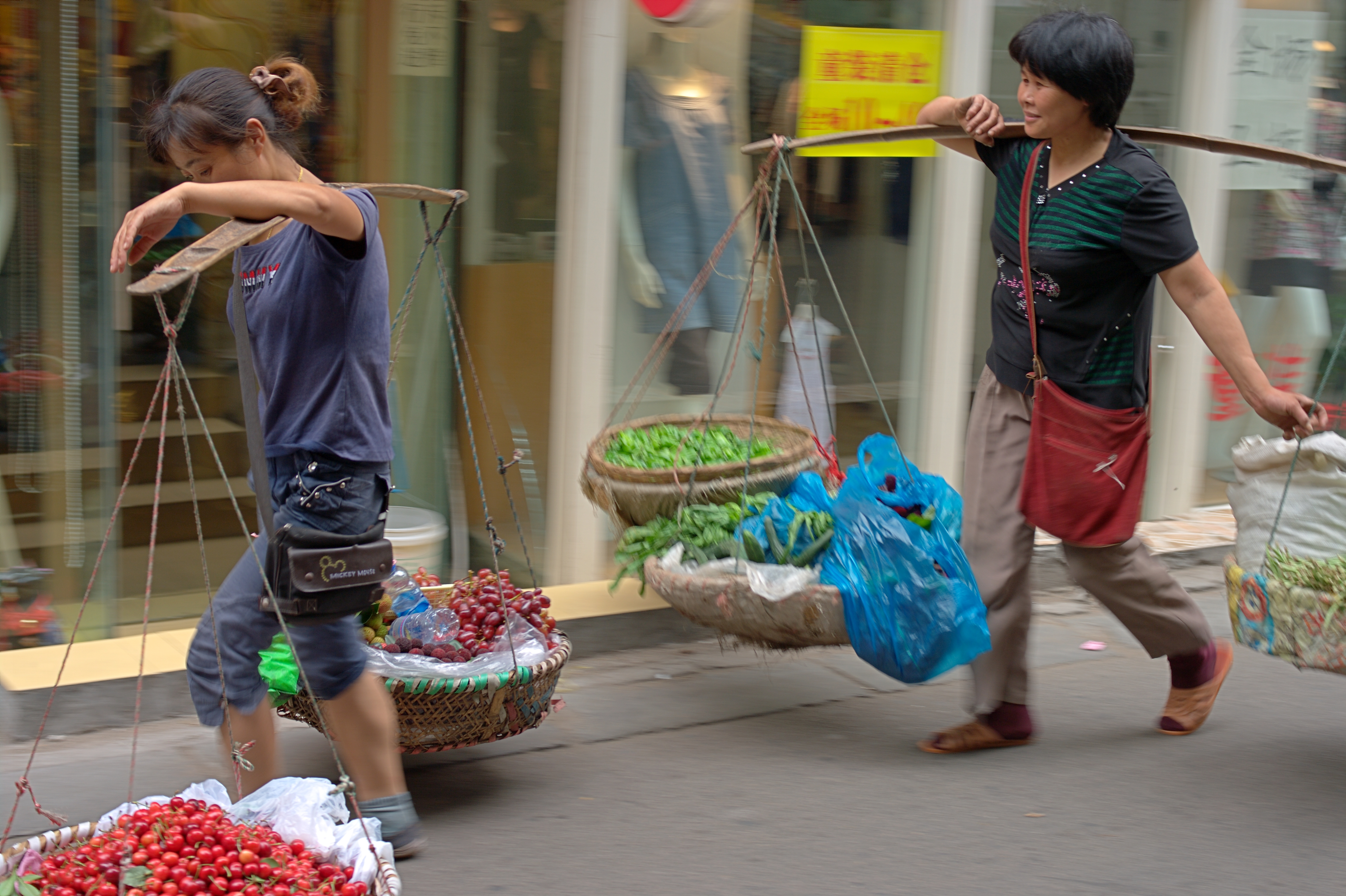
Two Chinese women using carrying poles to transport produce Nanjing, China.

This device is still widely used in East Asia, and is considered an icon of the region.

The yoke of this type is sometimes made of wood, but is usually made of bamboo. A large diameter piece of bamboo is used. It is split to produce a fairly flat piece, which is then tapered at each end. A notch is cut at the ends, similar in shape to an arrow head. This prevents the ropes from slipping off. The bamboo yoke is normally between 1 and 1.5 meters in length, and carried with the curved (outside surface) of the bamboo against the shoulder. Three ropes, about 0.5 metres each, attach the basket to the ends of the yoke. Throughout China, the baskets usually include a cover, but these are rarely used. They are normally kept inverted on the top of the baskets. The goods are placed within the inverted cover.

This device is not only used to transport goods, but is very commonly used as a point of sale. A vendor fills the baskets with goods, normally fruits and vegetables, a small stool, plastic bags, and a scale, and selects a roadside location in a place with plenty of foot traffic. There, they sell their goods. Often, they move from one place to another depending on sales.

The carrying pole has distinct advantages over the vending cart, the other main manual conveyance of goods in East Asia. The carrying pole can be transported within a motorized vehicle. It is common in China for a group of vendors to enter an urban area each morning in a truck from their village. From a central area, the vendors disperse, selling their goods. Later in the day, they return to the truck then to their village. Independent vendors are also often allowed to transport their carrying poles on intercity buses, and can be seen entering cities to sell their goods.

== Gallery ==
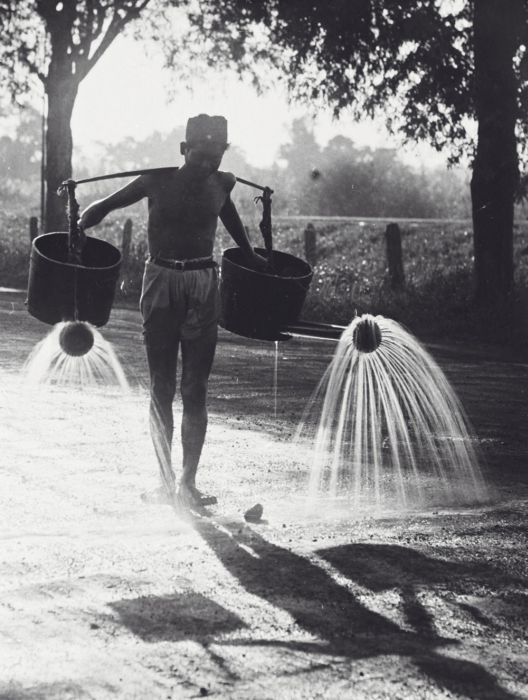
A worker waters a road in the Dutch East Indies

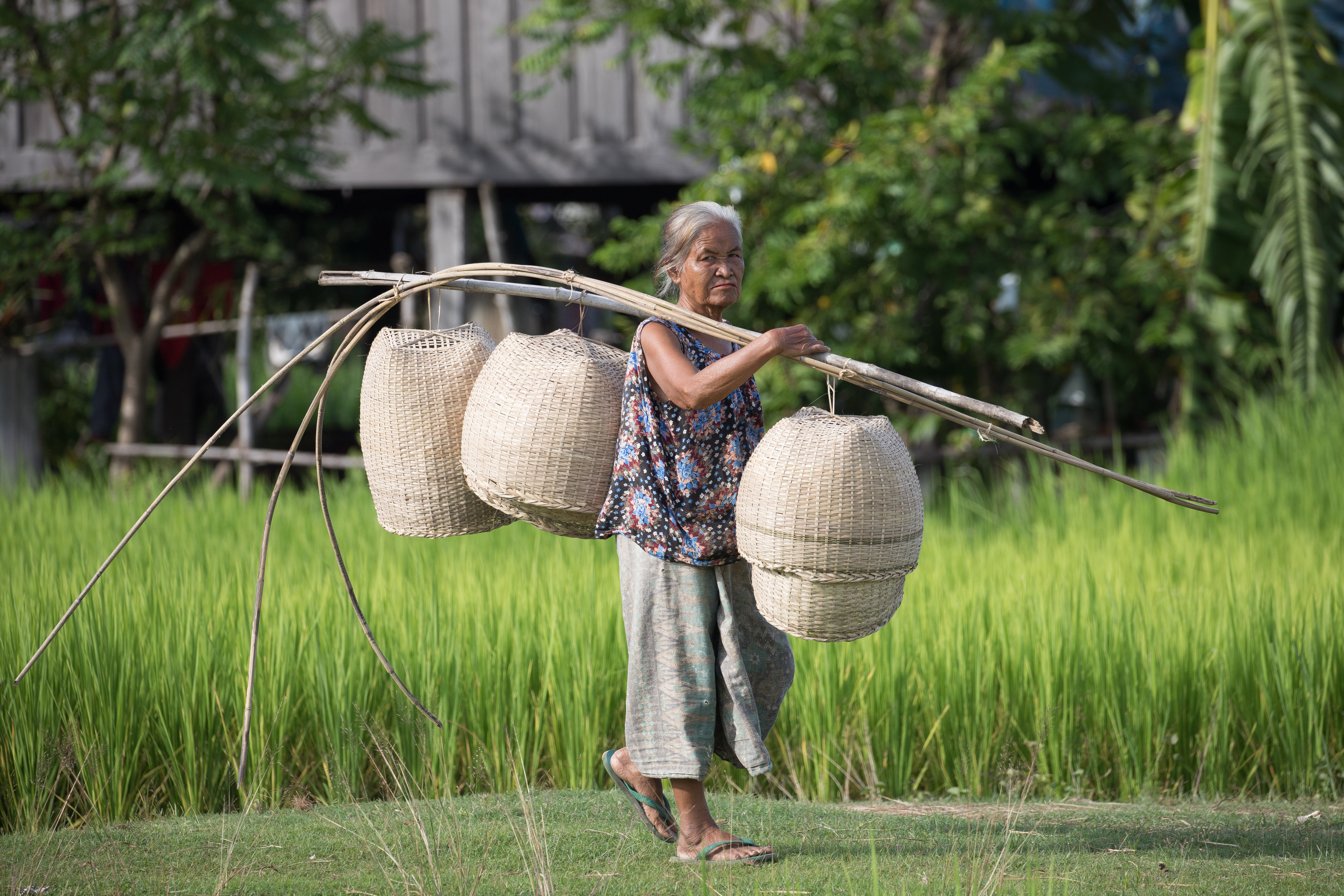
Woman carrying wicker baskets, Laos

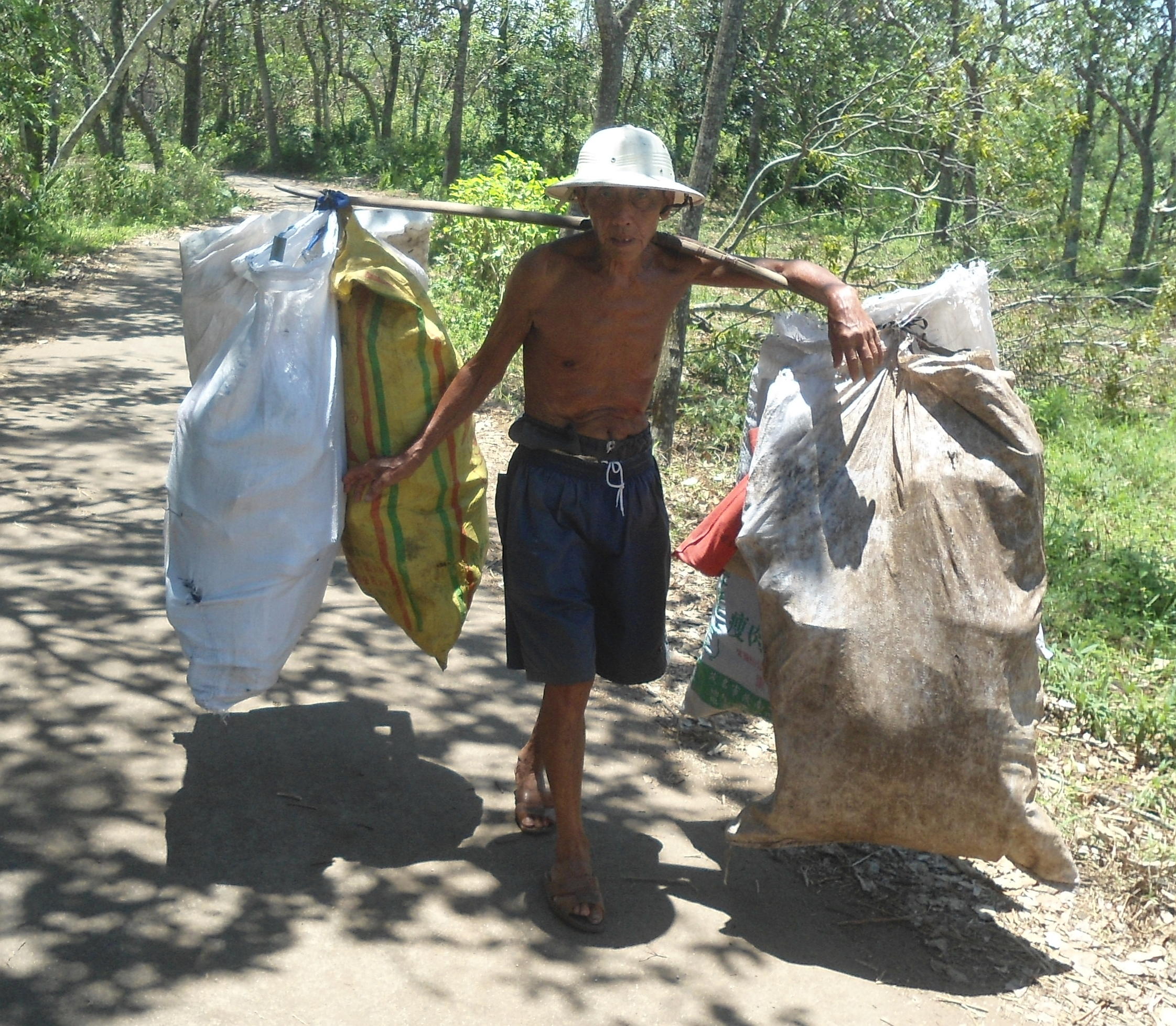
A man carrying everyday items in Hainan, China

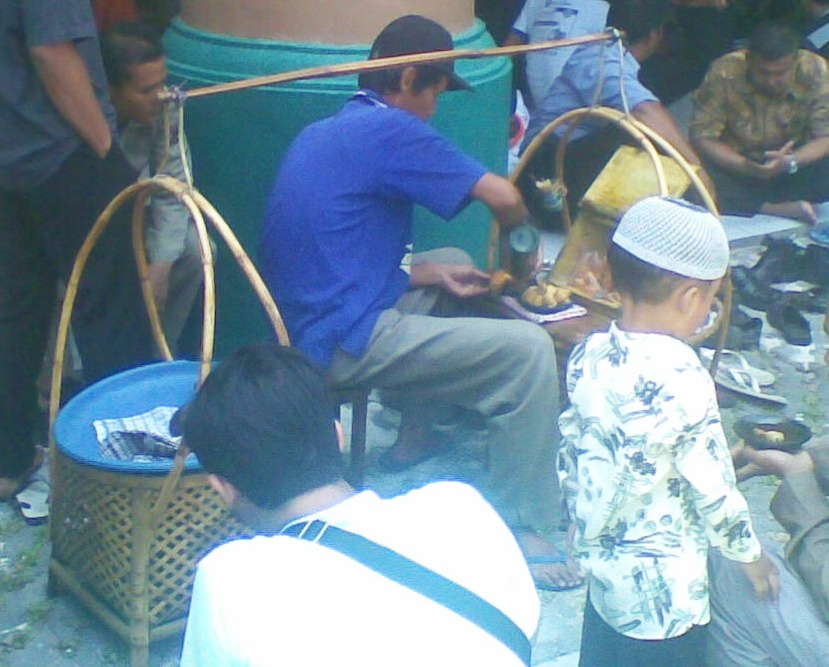
Man serving tahu gejrot in Indonesia

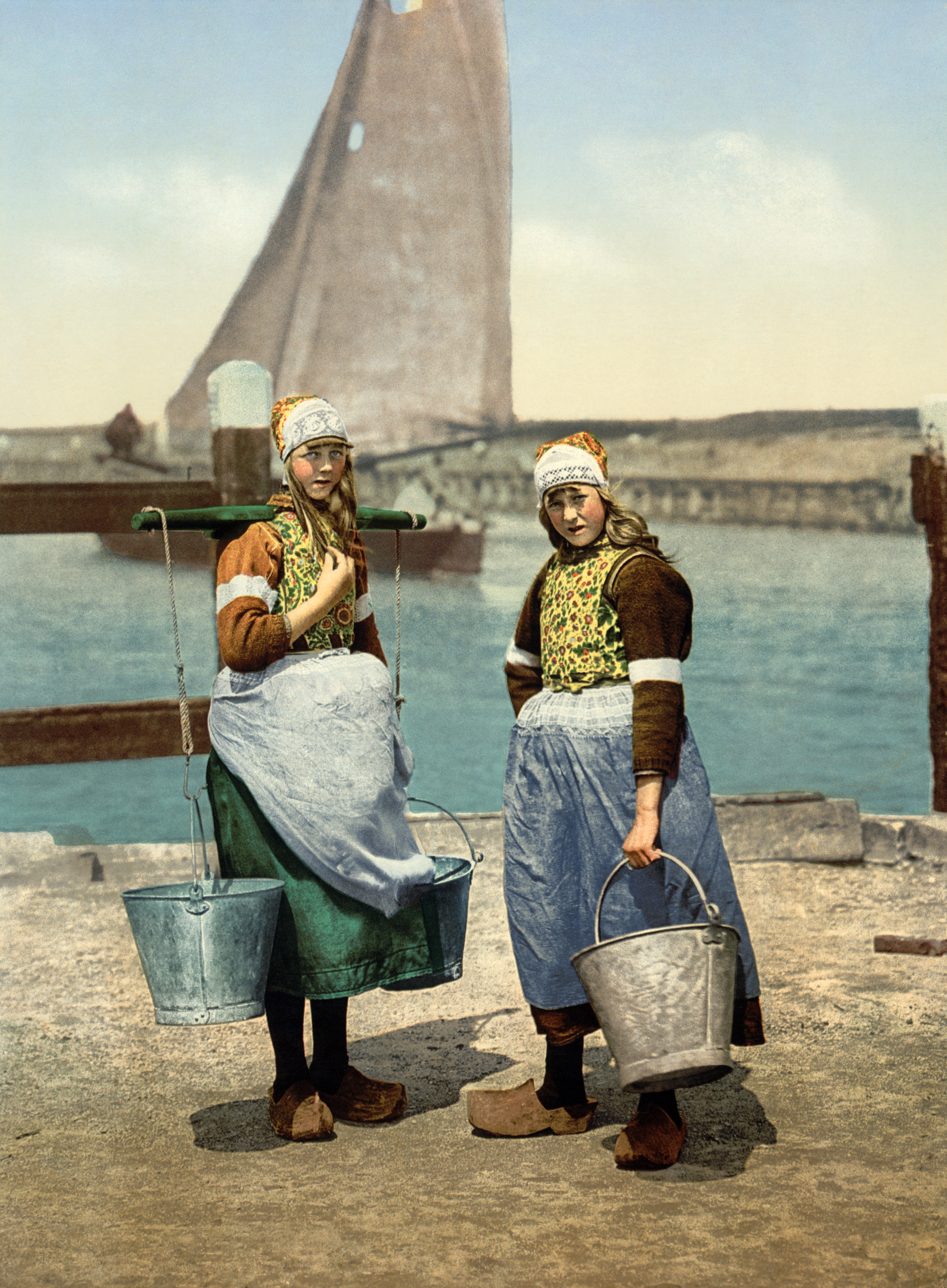
Two girls on the isle of Marken, the Netherlands, carrying water buckets on a yoke (circa 1900)

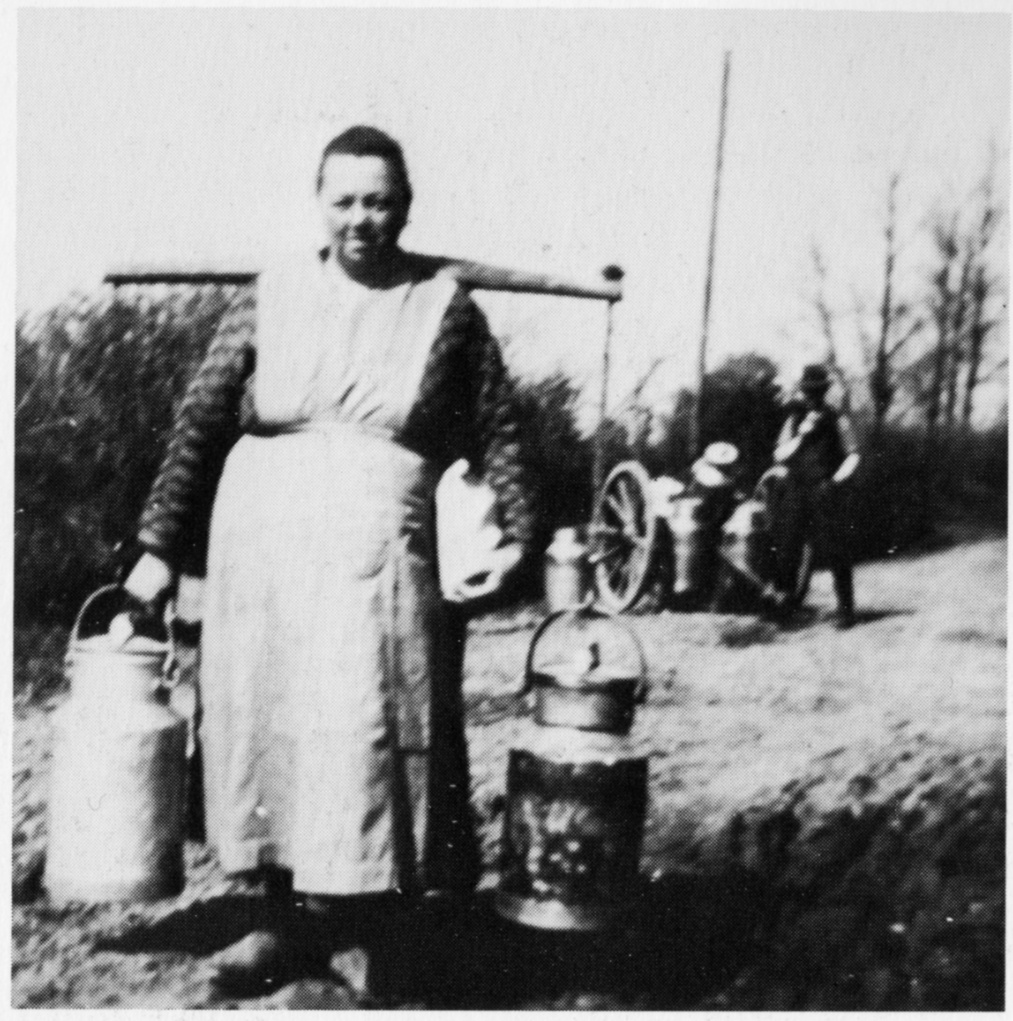
A Danish milk maid

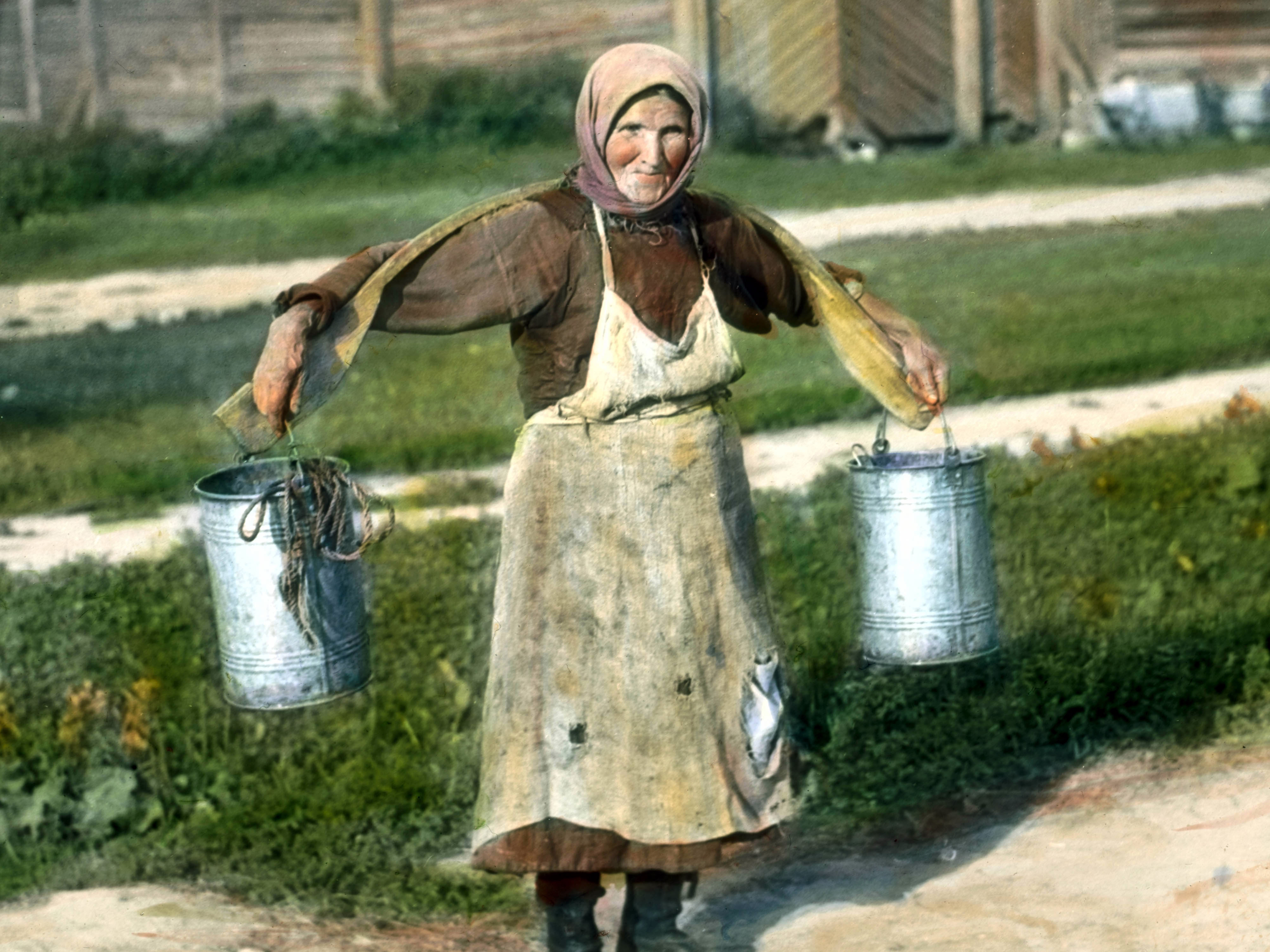
Russian woman with carrying yoke near Leningrad (1932)

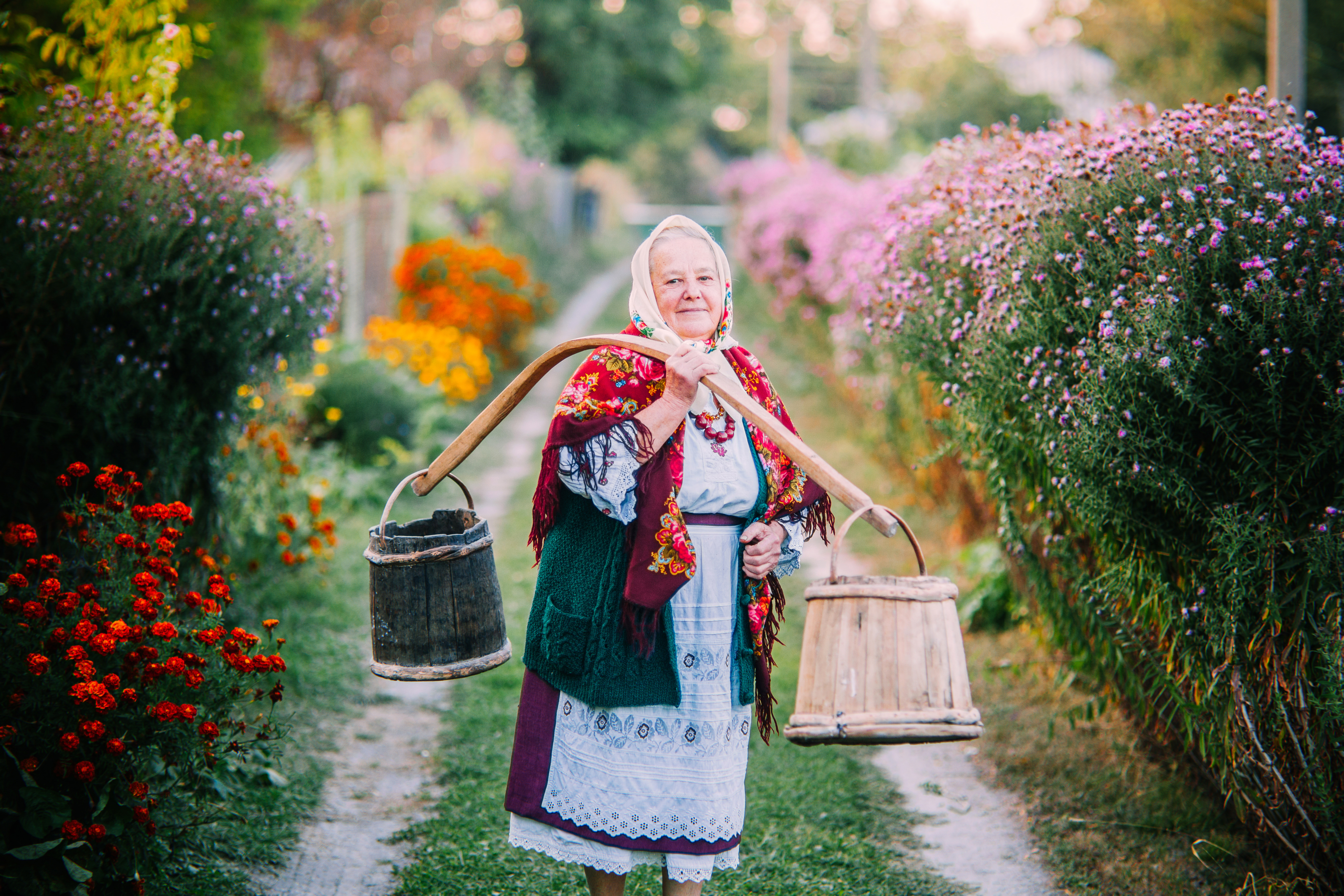
Ukrainian woman wearing traditional dress with carrying yoke

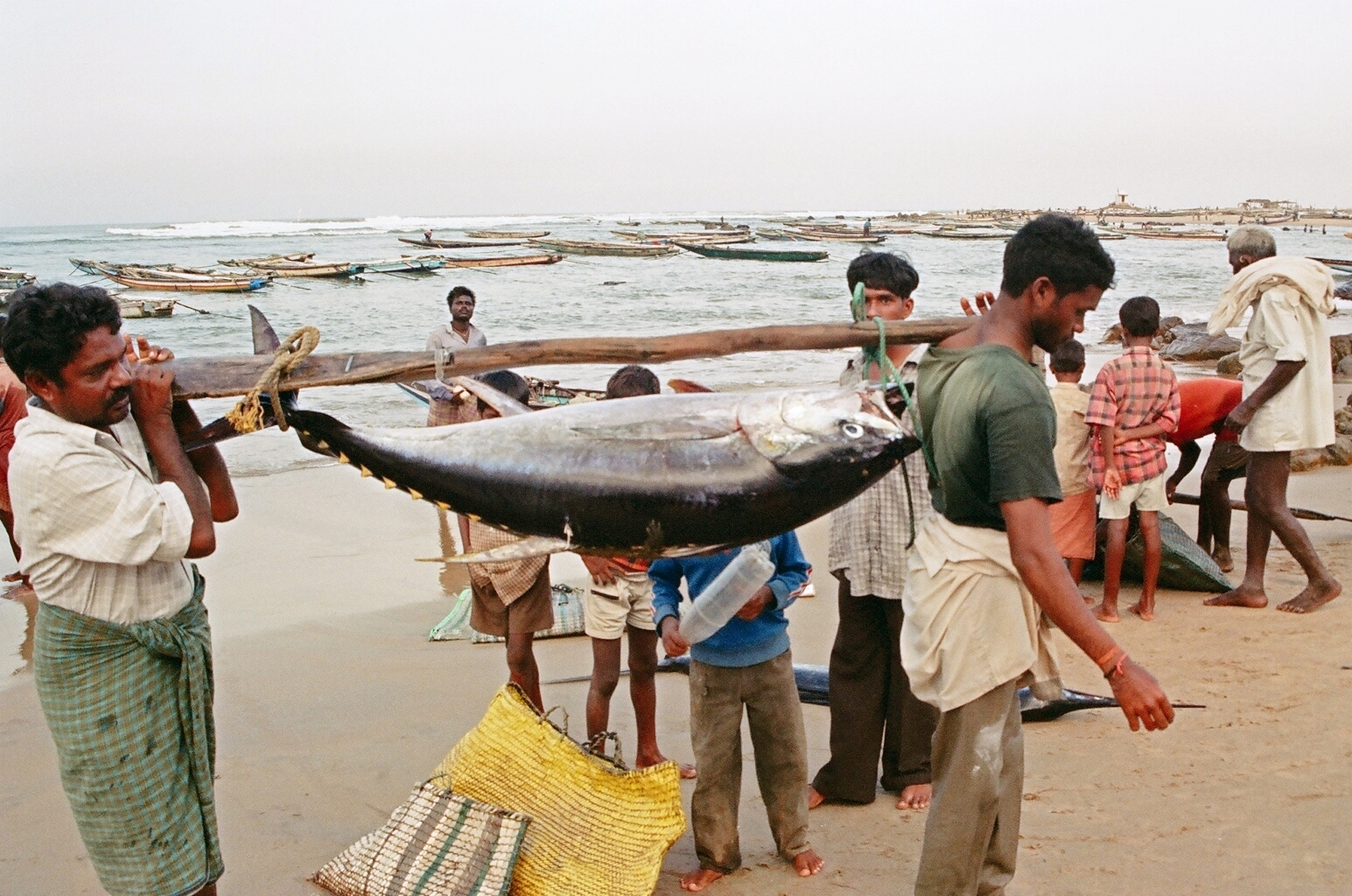
Fishermen in Visakhapatnam, India, returning with a tuna

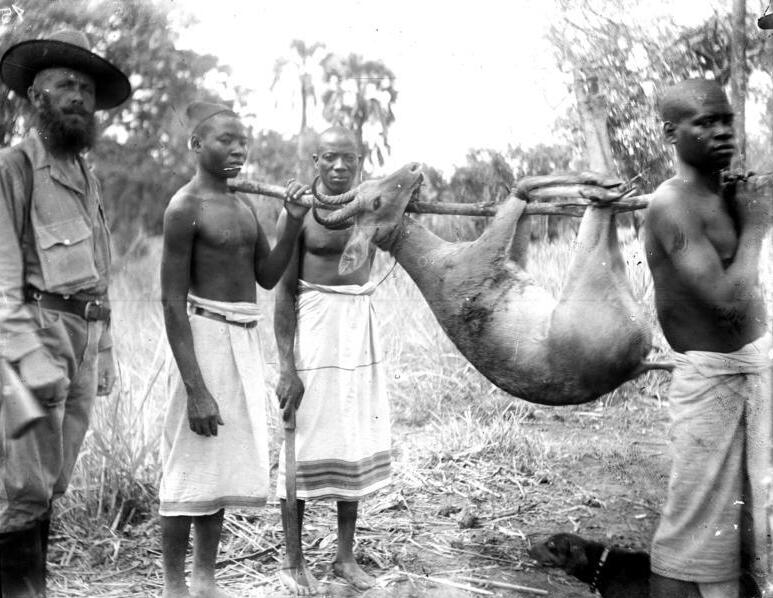
Returning from a hunt in German East Africa (circa 1912)

== See also ==
- Bindle – Sack stereotypically used by hobos
- Kanwar Yatra – Hindu pilgrimage to the Ganges River
- Picul – Traditional Asian unit of mass
- Litter (vehicle) – Human-powered wheelless vehicle for the transport of persons
- Travois – Load-dragging structure
