= Barrytown (franchise) =

Irish media franchise by Roddy Doyle

- Created by: Roddy Doyle
- Original work: The Commitments (1987)
- Owners: Beacon Pictures; 20th Century Fox; Deadly Films; BBC Film
- Years: 1987–present

Print publications
- Novel(s): The Commitments (1987); The Snapper (1990); The Van (1991); The Guts (2013); Spin-off: Paddy Clarke Ha Ha Ha (1993)
- Short stories: Two Pints (2012); Two More Pints (2014)

Films and television
- Film(s): The Commitments (1991); The Snapper (1993); The Van (1996); The Commitments 2 (cancelled)
- Television series: Screen Two (1993)

Theatrical presentations
- Play(s): The Snapper (2018–present)
- Musical(s): The Commitments (2013–present)

Audio
- Soundtrack(s): The Commitments Vol. 1 (1991); The Commitments Vol. 2 (1992)

Official website
- TheCommitments.co.uk

Barrytown is an Irish comedy-drama media franchise centred on the Rabbittes, a working-class family from the fictional suburb of Barrytown, in Dublin. It began in 1988 when Beacon Pictures and 20th Century Fox bought the rights to the 1987 novel The Commitments by Roddy Doyle shortly after it was published. The book was successful, as was Alan Parker's 1991 film adaptation, which achieved cult status and is regarded as one of the best Irish films ever made.

A sequel novel, The Snapper, was published in 1990, followed by a film adaptation in 1993. A third novel, The Van, was published and shortlisted for the 1991 Booker Prize, followed by a film adaptation in 1996. Paddy Clarke Ha Ha Ha, a spin-off published in 1993 by Secker and Warburg, won the Booker Prize for that year, with an epilogue novel, The Guts, published in 2013. A musical and stage play based on the first two installments of the series have also been produced, ongoing from 2013 and 2018.

== Novels ==
=== The Commitments (1988) ===
Following the 1988 publication of Roddy Doyle's novel The Commitments (1987) in the United Kingdom, producers Lynda Myles and Roger Randall-Cutler acquired the film rights, and asked Doyle to write an adaptation. Doyle, an inexperienced screenwriter, spent one year drafting the script, accompanied by Myles and Randall-Cutler. Although a script was completed, Myles felt it needed improvement, and passed the book on to Dick Clement and Ian La Frenais, hoping that they would suggest a more experienced writer. Upon reading the novel, Clement and La Frenais agreed to help write the script themselves.

=== The Snapper (1990) ===
The Snapper revolves around unmarried twenty-year-old Sharon Rabbitte's pregnancy, and the unexpected effects this has on her conservative, working class Dublin family.

=== The Van (1991) ===
The Van focuses on the elder Jimmy Rabbitte and his efforts at going into business with his best friend Bimbo, after both lose their jobs. It was shortlisted for the Booker Prize (1991).

=== Paddy Clarke Ha Ha Ha (1993) ===
Paddy Clarke Ha Ha Ha is a novel written by Roddy Doyle. It is a spin-off following one year in the life of a Dublin ten-year-old, Patrick "Paddy" Clarke, as he explores Barrytown through his parents' divorce, encountering various characters from the Barrytown series of novels.

=== The Guts (2013) ===
Set thirty years later, The Guts follows the younger Jimmy Rabbitte as he is suffering from bowel cancer. The novel was named Novel of the Year at the 2013 Irish Book Awards.

=== Short stories ===
Throughout the early 2010s, Doyle frequently posted short comic dialogues on his Facebook page between two older men in a Barrytown pub, often relating to current events in Ireland (such as the 2015 marriage referendum) and further afield. These developed into the novella short story collection Two Pints in 2012 and Two More Pints in 2014.

=== Rabitte family members ===
- James "Jimmy" Rabbitte Sr. – the patriarch and protagonist of the third Barrytown novel, The Van, in which he and a friend, Brendan "Bimbo" Reeves, buy a chipper van as a business opportunity during the 1990 World Cup.
- Veronica Rabbitte – the matriarch of the family who tries to keep the peace and is often known to have a laugh at her family's antics.
- Sharon Rabbitte – the eldest daughter and the protagonist of the second novel, The Snapper, in which she comes to terms with her pregnancy and later gives birth to a daughter, Georgina (whom the family call "Gina" for short).
- Georgina "Gina" Rabbitte – Sharon's daughter, born in The Snapper and featured as a toddler in The Van, often repeating in baby talk the profanity used by family members.
- James "Jimmy" Rabbitte Jr. – the eldest son and protagonist of the first novel, The Commitments, in which he and several friends form an Irish soul band. In The Snapper, Jimmy frequently practices being a DJ, much to the predictable annoyance of his father. In the third novel, he has moved out of home and is living with his girlfriend, Aoife but still makes frequent visits home. In The Guts, Jimmy has since married Aoife and they have four children, and he is suffering from bowel cancer.
- Leslie Rabbitte – the second-born son of Jimmy Sr. and Veronica. The least prominent of the children, he is almost never at home in the trilogy. Leslie is frequently in trouble and clashes with his father. In The Guts, He reconnects with Jimmy Jr. through Social Media and attends a festival with him.
- Darren Rabbitte – the youngest son, still at school. He decides to become a vegetarian in The Van yet helps Jimmy Sr. with his business.
- Tracy and Linda Rabbitte – the two youngest children, twin girls, who frequently behave mischievously, provoking the ire of the parents.
- Larrygogan – a dog who becomes the family's pet in The Snapper.

== Films ==
Film	U.S. release date	Director(s)	Screenwriter(s)	Story by	Producer(s)	
The Commitments	August 6, 1991	Alan Parker	Dick Clement, Ian La Frenais, & Roddy Doyle	Roddy Doyle	Roger Randall-Cutler	Lynda Myles
The Snapper	April 4, 1993	Stephen Frears	Roddy Doyle	Roddy Doyle	Ian Hopkins	Lynda Myles
The Van	May 11, 1996	Stephen Frears	Roddy Doyle	Roddy Doyle	Mark Shivas	Lynda Myles

=== The Commitments (1991) ===
Jimmy Rabbitte (Robert Arkins), a self-proclaimed promoter, decides to organise an R&B group to fill the musical void in his hometown of Dublin, Ireland. The band comes together but ends up consisting entirely of white musicians who have little experience with the genre. Even though their raw talent and lofty aspirations gain the group notoriety, the pitfalls of fame began to tear at their newfound friendships as they prepare for their big show. The film also stars Angeline Ball, Maria Doyle, Bronagh Gallagher, Glen Hansard, Andrew Strong, Colm Meaney, and Andrea Corr.

Many of the actors involved in The Commitments went on to pursue various acting and musical careers. Robert Arkins signed a record deal with MCA Records in 1993, although he did not finish recording the consequent album. He has produced work for a number of commercial clients, television projects, and composed music for two short films. Andrew Strong went on to produce several albums, which he described as having elements of R&B and rock. He has performed alongside The Rolling Stones, Elton John and Ray Charles, and formed his own band, The Bone Yard Boys, in 2003. In 1993, two of the film's cast members, Kenneth McCluskey and Dick Massey, formed their own tribute act band, The Stars from the Commitments. The 9-piece band has since played more than 1,000 shows worldwide, and has played with B.B. King, James Brown and Wilson Pickett.

The Commitments underperformed at the North American box office, grossing $14.9 million during its theatrical run. Reviewers praised the music, performances and humour, while criticism was occasionally aimed at the pacing and Parker's direction. The film resulted in two soundtrack albums released by MCA Records; the first reached #8 on the Billboard 200 album chart and achieved triple-platinum status, while the second album achieved gold sales status. At the 1992 British Academy Film Awards, the film won four of six BAFTA Awards for Best Film, Best Direction, Best Adapted Screenplay and Best Editing. It also received an Academy Award nomination for Best Film Editing.

=== The Snapper (1993) ===
Doyle was given creative freedom by the BBC over the adaptation of The Snapper, for which he wrote the screenplay. Lynda Myles returned to produce the film and hired Stephen Frears as its director. Colm Meaney also returned. The adaptation was originally planned as a television film, as an episode of the British television anthology drama series Screen Two, before Frears suggested that it be transferred to film. Doyle disagreed with the change, saying that he never liked to be made for the big screen, which he thought was grainy. The Snapper (1993) premiered at the 1993 Cannes Film Festival, where it received a standing ovation. It was a critical success, receiving largely positive reviews.

The sequel again features the Rabbitte family, but due to rights problems, the family surname in The Snapper was changed from 'Rabbitte' to 'Curley'. The film centres on Sharon Curley, the eldest daughter of the family, and her experience of unplanned teen pregnancy. The film also stars Brendan Gleeson, Pat Laffan, Ronan Wilmot, and Stanley Townsend.

=== The Van (1996) ===
For the film adaptation of The Van, Doyle and Myles formed their own production company, Deadly Films, and the author was given creative control over the selection of its cast and director. Frears returned as director, and Meaney was cast in the lead role. Although The Van (1996) premiered at the 1996 Cannes Film Festival to some favorable reviews, critical reaction was negative upon release; reviewers criticised the film for its thin material and lack of strong characterisation.

The film deals with themes of unemployment and self-worth, as Brendan "Bimbo" Reeves (Donal O'Kelly) and Larry (Colm Meaney) cope with losing their jobs and embark on a partnership to sell fried food from the eponymous van. The film also stars Ger Ryan, Rúaidhrí Conroy, Brendan O'Carroll, Stuart Dunne, Marie Mullen, and Jon Kenny.

=== Mooted sequel ===
In January 2000, Harvey Weinstein acquired the film rights to The Commitments for Miramax and commissioned playwright Warren Leight to write a direct sequel to the film, with Cathy Konrad attached as a producer. The premise involved several members of The Commitments pairing with new band members before going on tour in the United States. The project subsequently entered development hell.

=== Cast and crew ===
==== Principal cast ====
List indicators
- A dark gray cell indicates the character was not featured in the film.
- A ^{P} indicates an appearance through a photographic still.
- An ^{L} indicates an appearance through the use of an actor or actress's facial likeness.
- A ^{V} indicates a performance through voice-over work.
- A ^{C} indicates a cameo appearance.

Characters	The Commitments	The Snapper	The Van
Characters	1991	1993	1996
Mr. Rabbitte	Colm Meaney (Note: Nicknamed Jimmy, Dessie, and Larry.)	Colm Meaney	Colm Meaney
Missis Twix	Sheila Flitton	Sheila Flitton	Sheila Flitton
Barrytown Nightclub Bouncer	Seán O'Donovan	Seán O'Donovan	Seán O'Donovan
Mrs. Rabbitte	Anne Kent	Ruth McCabe (Note: Nicknamed Kay and Mary.)	Caroline Rothwell
Roddy the Reporter	Phelim Drew	Roddy Doyle^{C}	Roddy Doyle^{C}
Jimmy Rabbitte	Robert Arkins		Rúaidhrí Conroy (Note: Nicknamed Kevin.)
Maggie the Pawnbroker	Ger Ryan		Ger Ryan
Greg the Arsenal Supporter	Michael O'Reilly		Michael O'Reilly
Sonny Rabbitte	Peter Rowen	Peter Rowen	
Craig Rabbitte	Eanna MacLiam	Eanna MacLiam	
Bernie's Mother	Rynagh O'Grady	Rynagh O'Grady	
Sharon Rabbitte	Andrea Corr	Tina Kellegher	Neilí Conroy (Note: Nicknamed Diane.)
Darren Rabbitte	Gerard Cassoni	Colm O'Byrne	
Tracy Rabbitte	Ruth Fairclough	Deirdre O'Brien (Note: As Mary.)	
Linda Rabbitte	Lindsay Fairclough	Dierdre O'Brien	
Cancer Policeman		Jack Lynch	Jack Lynch
Paddy the Bald Man		Ronan Wilmot	Ronan Wilmot
Des Health Inspector Anaesthetist		Stanley Townsend	Stanley Townsend
Jackie O'Keefe		Fionnuala Murphy	Fionnuala Murphy
Sam Bertie		Stuart Dunne	Stuart Dunne
Dawn		Barbara Bergin	Barbara Bergin
Baby Curley		Aisling Conlan and Alannagh McMullen	
Brendan "Bimbo" Reeves			Donal O'Kelly
Steven Clifford	Michael Aherne		
Imelda Quirke	Angeline Ball		
Natalie Murphy	Maria Doyle		
Mickah Wallace	Dave Finnegan		
Bernie McGloughlin	Bronagh Gallagher		
Dean Fay	Félim Gormley		
Outspan Foster	Glen Hansard		
Billy Mooney	Dick Massey		
Joey "The Lips" Fagan	Johnny Murphy		
Derek Scully	Kenneth McCluskey		
Deco Cuffe	Andrew Strong		
Duffy	Liam Carney		
Father Molloy	Mark O'Regan		
Dave from Eejit Records	Sean Hughes		
Ray	Philip Bredin		
Imelda's Sister	Aoife Lawless		
Kid with Harmonica	Lance Daly		
Protest Song Singer	Conor Malone		
Heavy Metal Singer	Jezz Bell		
Fiddler Auditioner	Colm Mac Con Iomaire		
Punk Girl Singer	Emily Dawson		
Coconuts Trio	Dave Kane		
Coconuts Trio	Kristel Harris		
Coconuts Trio	Maria Place		
Uileann Pipe Player	Brian MacAodha		
Les Misérables Singer	Tricia Smith		
Smiths' Song Singer	Canice William		
Cajun Trio	Patrick Foy		
Cajun Trio	Alan Murray		
Cajun Trio	Jody Campbell		
Rabbittes' Neighbour	Philomena Kavanagh		
Only De Lonely Singer	Eamon O'Connor		
Joey's Mother	Maura O'Malley		
Pool Hall Manager	Blaise Smith		
Duffy's Sidekicks	Derek Herbert; Owen O'Gorman		
Unemployment Official	Pat Leavy		
Kid with Horse	John Cronin		
Community Centre Kid	Michael Bolger		
Imelda's Father	Mick Nolan		
Imelda's Mother	Eileen Reid		
Regency Pub Barman	Bob Navan		
Photographer	Derek Duggan		
Rock Salmon Man	Paddy O'Connor		
Avant-Garde-A-Clue Band / Eejit Engineer	Paul Bushnell		
Avant-Garde-A-Clue Band	Jim Corr		
Avant-Garde-A-Clue Band	Larry Hogan		
Avant-Garde-A-Clue Band	Bernard Keelan		
Dance Hall Manager	Ronan Hardiman		
Music Journalist	Mikel Murfi		
Deco's Fan	Josylen Lyons		
Man in Limousine	Winston Dennis		
Eejit Record Producer	Alan Parker		
James Brown	James Brown^{A}		
Extra	Caroline Corr		
Fiddle Player	Sharon Corr		
Photographer	Alan Howley		
Wedding Guest	Mark Leahy		
Auditioning Guitarist	Ralph G. Morse		
Young Priest	Martin O'Malley		
Lisa Rabbitte		Joanne Gerrard	
Kimberley Rabbitte		Ciara Duffy	
Yvonne Burgess		Karen Woodley	
George Burgess		Pat Laffan	
Doris Burgess		Virginia Cole	
Pat Burgess		Denis Menton	
Lester		Brendan Gleeson	
Boy #1		Dylan Tighe	
Girl #1		Caroline Boyle	
Checkout Woman		Jennifer Kelly	
Customer, Neighbour #3		Audrey Corr	
Desk Nurse		Cathy Belton	
Doctor		Miriam Kelly	
Dr. Cook		Eleanor Methven	
Loner		Birdie Sweeney	
Midwife		Billie Morton	
Woman in Hospital		Joan Sheehy	
Oul'One		Cathleen Delaney	
Nurse		Ailish Connolly	
Supermarket Trainee Manager		Stephen Kennedy	
Woman in Police Station		Britta Smith	
Barrytown Neighbours		Conor Evans; Helen Roche; Marie Conmee; Jimmy Keogh	
Pal #1		Tom Murphy	
Pal #2		Robbie Doolin	
Young Lad / Dad		Matthew Devereux	
Famine		Sandy	
Diane			Neilí Conroy
Weslie			Brendan O'Carroll
Maggie's Mum			Laurie Morton
Vera			Marie Mullen
Gerry McCarthy			Jon Kenny
Glenn			Moses Rowen
Jessica			Linda McGovern
Wayne			Eoin Chaney
Wally			Frank O'Sullivan
Mona			Jill Doyle
Anne Marie			Charlotte Bradley
Mechanic			Alan King
Pregnant Woman			Bernie Downes
Garda Sergeant			Martin Dunne
Nightclub Barman			Tommy O'Neill
Bingo Woman			Eilish Moore
Pitch & Putt Man			Paul Raynor
Crushed Girl			Eileen Walsh
Complaining Woman			Sandra Bagnall
Boy with Choc Ice			David Kelly
Crying Boy			Lee Bagnall
Other Kid			Jamie Bagnall
Barry			David Byrne
World Peace			Gavin Keilty
Leo the Barman			Claude Clancy
Girl			Michelle Gallagher
Nightclub Bouncer			Arthur Napper
Kerrie			Jessie O'Gorman
Country Club Lunch Guest			Phil Parlapiano

The surname of the Rabbitte family was changed to the maiden name of Curley for the film adaptations of The Snapper and The Van, as 20th Century Fox owns the rights to the Rabbitte name from The Commitments, who were not involved in the adaptations of subsequent works in the trilogy.

==== Additional crew ====
Role	The Commitments	The Snapper	The Van
Role	1991	1993	1996
Composer	G. Marq Roswell	Stanley Myers	Eric Clapton; Richard Hartley
Editor	Gerry Hambling	Mick Audsley	Mick Audsley
Cinematographer	Gale Tattersall	Oliver Stapleton	Oliver Stapleton
Production companies	Beacon Pictures; The First Film Company; Dirty Hands Productions	BBC	Beacon Pictures; Deadly Films; BBC Films
Distributor	20th Century Fox	Miramax	20th Century Fox

=== Reception ===
==== Box office performance ====
Film	North American release date	Budget	Box office gross			Box office ranking		Reference
Film	North American release date	Budget	North America	Other territories	Worldwide	All-time North America	All-time worldwide	Reference
The Commitments	August 6, 1991	$12–15 million	$14,919,570	£8,285,701	$26,679,175.40	#37	#40	
The Van	November 29, 1996	—N/a	—N/a	$712,095	$712,095	#155	#156	
Total		$12–15 million	$14,919,570	$8,997,796	$2,668,629,635			

==== Critical and public response ====
Film	Rotten Tomatoes	Metacritic
The Commitments	89% (44 reviews)	73 (23 critics)
The Snapper	97% (33 reviews)	83 (18 critics)
The Van	38% (21 reviews)	—N/a

==== Accolades ====
Award	Category	Film	
Award	Category	The Commitments	The Snapper
Academy Award	Film Editing	Nominated	
Golden Globe Award	Best Motion Picture – Musical or Comedy	Nominated	
BAFTA Award	Best Film	Won	
BAFTA Award	Best Direction	Won	
BAFTA Award	Best Adapted Screenplay	Won	
BAFTA Award	Best Editing	Won	
BAFTA Award	Best Supporting Actor	Nominated	
BAFTA Award	Best Sound	Nominated	
AFI Award	Best Foreign Film	Nominated	
Brit Award	Best Soundtrack	Won	
Evening Standard British Film Award	Peter Sellers Award for Comedy	Won	
London Film Critics Circle Award	British Producer of the Year	Won	
London Film Critics Circle Award	British Director of the Year	Won	
London Film Critics Circle Award	British or Irish Screenwriter of the Year	Won	
Writers Guild of America Award	Best Adapted Screenplay	Nominated	
Tokyo International Film Festival	Tokyo Grand Prix Award	Nominated	
Tokyo International Film Festival	Best Director Award	Won	
Goya Award	Best European Film		Won
Golden Globe Award	Best Actor – Motion Picture Musical or Comedy		Nominated

==== Legacy ====
An image of four of the actors of the original film, in character, was featured on an Irish postage stamp as part of the Ireland 1996: Irish Cinema Centenary series issued by An Post; the image includes lead singer Deco Cuffe (Andrew Strong), along with the three "Commitmentettes" – Imelda Quirke (Angeline Ball), Natalie Murphy (Maria Doyle Kennedy) and Bernie McGloughlin (Bronagh Gallagher).

=== Music ===
==== Soundtracks ====
Title	U.S. release date	Length	Composer(s)	Label
The Commitments (Original Motion Picture Soundtrack)	August 13, 1991	46:16	Paul Bushnell, Kevin Killen, and Alan Parker	MCA
The Commitments, Vol. 2: Music from the Original Motion Picture Soundtrack	March 17, 1992	35:53	Paul Bushnell and Kevin Killen	MCA

== Musical ==
Doyle's novel The Commitments and its 1991 film adaptation inspired a 2013 musical stage production, directed by British theatre director Jamie Lloyd. Following the film's success, Doyle had previously turned down offers to adapt his novel into a stage production. The Commitments began previews on 21 September 2013 in London's West End at the Palace Theatre, before its official opening night on 8 October. The show had more than 1,000 performances before officially closing in London on 1 November 2015. The United Kingdom and Ireland tour commenced in 2017.

== Stage play ==
In 2018, the Gate Theatre commissioned Doyle to write a stage adaptation of The Snapper. The show was directed by Róisín McBrinn and was revived in 2019.
