= 1991 in Ireland =

- Centuries: 18th; 19th; 20th; 21st
- Decades: 1970s; 1980s; 1990s; 2000s; 2010s
- See also: 1991 in Northern Ireland; Other events of 1991; List of years in Ireland

Events from the year 1991 in Ireland.

== Incumbents ==
- President: Mary Robinson
- Taoiseach: Charles Haughey (FF)
- Tánaiste: John Wilson (FF)
- Minister for Finance:
  - Albert Reynolds (FF) (until 7 November 1991)
  - Charles Haughey (FF) (from 7 November 1991 until 14 November 1991)
  - Bertie Ahern (FF) (from 14 November 1991)
- Chief Justice: Thomas Finlay
- Dáil: 26th
- Seanad: 19th

== Events ==
- 1 January – Limerick city celebrated 300 years of the Treaty of Limerick.
- 17 January – There was controversy as the Government allowed United States military aircraft bound for the Gulf War to refuel at Shannon Airport.
- 24 January – The new Government Buildings in the renovated College of Science were officially opened.
- 7 February – Downing Street mortar attack by the Provisional Irish Republican Army (IRA) in London.
- 14 March – After being wrongfully jailed for 16 years, the Birmingham Six were freed.
- 15 March – The Sugar Act provided for privatisation of Cómhlucht Siúicre Éireann, Teoranta, the state-owned sugar beet processor, as Greencore.
- 16 March – Dublin was officially inaugurated as the year's European Capital of Culture.
- 22 March – The President, Mary Robinson, against pressure not to do so from the Taoiseach, Charles Haughey, visited the Chester Beatty Library in Dublin where the Dalai Lama opened a Tibetan collection in the library. She was the only head of state in Europe to meet with him during his European trip. The Dalai Lama's first visit to Ireland was in 1973.
- 10 April – An unarmed IRA volunteer was shot dead in Downpatrick by the Royal Ulster Constabulary.
- 18 April – A memorial stone was unveiled on Black Hill (Kilbeg) above the village of Lacken, County Wicklow on the 50th anniversary of the crash of an RAF Handley Page Hampden aircraft which got lost in bad weather on 18 April 1941 during World War II and crashed, killing its entire crew of four.
- 16 May – Eyre Square Centre opened in Galway.
- 17 May – First edition of the Liffey Champion, local newspaper for North County Kildare and Lucan.
- 26 June – The wrongful convictions of the Maguire Seven were quashed in the UK.
- 6 November – Kildare TD Seán Power proposed a no-confidence motion in Taoiseach Charles Haughey's leadership.
- 7 November – The Minister for Finance, Albert Reynolds, was dismissed from the government over his intention to support the no-confidence motion.
- 13 November – Jim McDaid, the new Defence Minister, resigned following criticism from the Opposition over his attendance at an IRA funeral.
- 21 November – Three crew members of the M.V. Kilkenny were drowned as a result of a collision with the M.V. Hassel Werder in Dublin Bay.
- 6 December – Dublin Bus began its 'Nitelink' night bus service, aimed at facilitating revellers returning home from Christmas parties, as well as reducing instances of drink driving.

== Arts and literature ==
- 25 May – The Irish Museum of Modern Art opened at the Royal Hospital Kilmainham.
- November – The Dublin Writers Museum opened.
- The Corcadorca Theatre Company was established in Cork.
- Roddy Doyle's novel The Van, last of The Barrytown Trilogy, was published.
- Anne Enright's short story collection The Portable Virgin was published, and won the Rooney Prize for Irish Literature.

== Sport ==
=== Athletics ===
- Frank O'Mara won the world indoor 3,000 metre championship for the second time.

=== Cycling ===
- 19 October – Sean Kelly won the Giro di Lombardia.

=== Gaelic football ===
- The All-Ireland Senior Football Championship final finished on a score of Down 1–16 Meath 1–14.

=== Golf ===
- Carroll's Irish Open was won by Nick Faldo (England).

=== Hurling ===
- The All-Ireland Senior Hurling Championship final finished on a score of Tipperary 1–16 Kilkenny 0–15.

=== Motor racing ===
- Eddie Jordan entered his Jordan team in the World Formula One Championship, becoming the first Irish owned constructor in Formula One.

== Births ==
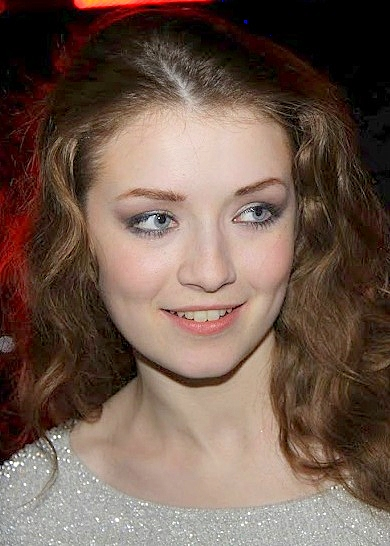
Sarah Bolger was born in February.

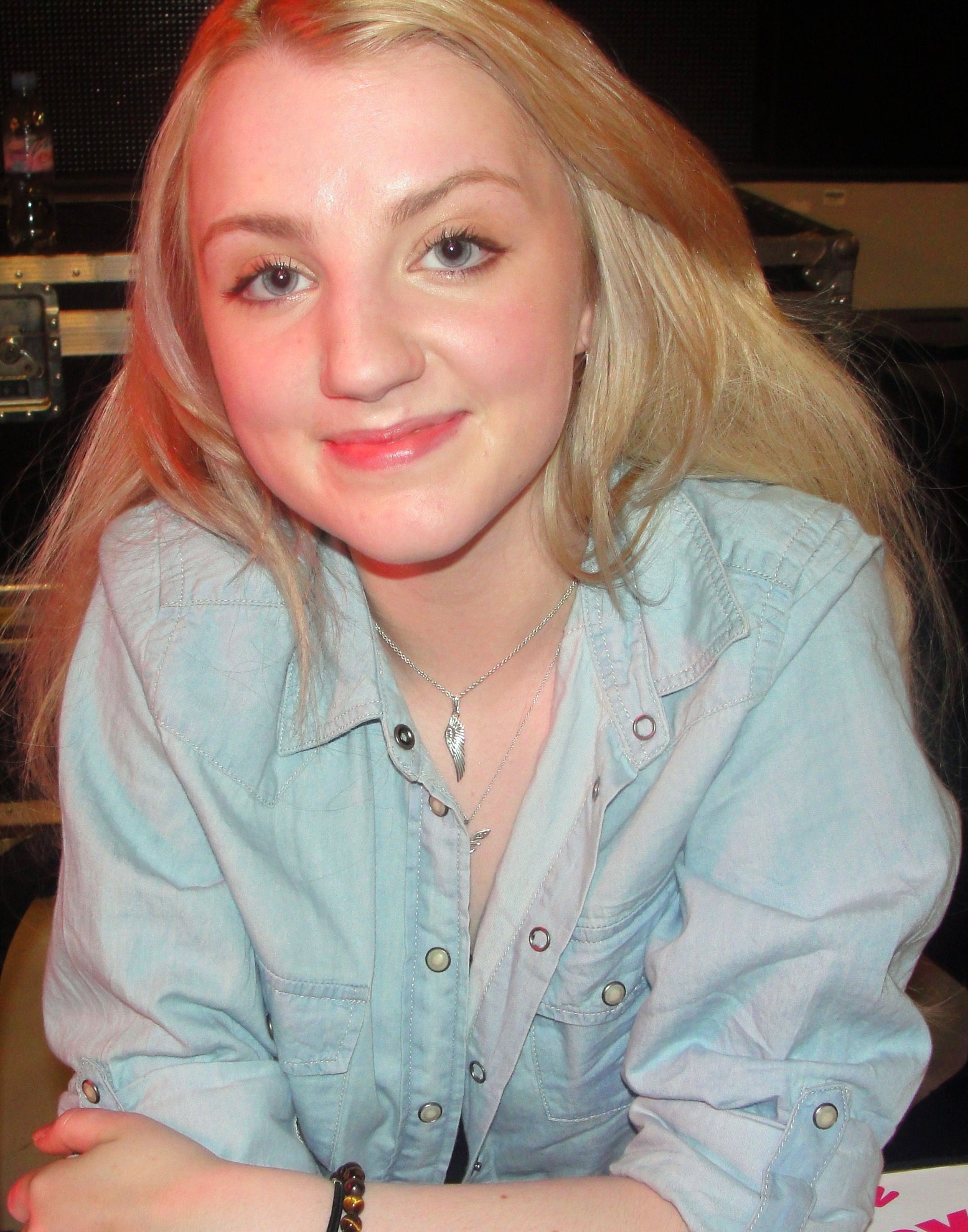
Evanna Lynch was born in August.

- 20 February – Sally Rooney, fiction writer.
- 28 February – Sarah Bolger, actress.
- 7 July – Eve Hewson, actress.
- 16 August – Evanna Lynch, actress.
- 14 October – Kevin Downes, hurler (Na Piarsaigh, Limerick).
- 16 October – Jedward, musical duo twins
- 30 October – Nick Sheridan, journalist (d. 2024).

== Deaths ==
=== January to June ===
- 5 January – Hubert Butler, writer and historian (born 1900)
- 29 January – Joe Stynes, Irish Republican and sportsman (born 1903).
- 19 February – Thekla Beere, civil servant (born 1902).
- 20 April – Seán Ó Faoláin, short story writer (born 1900).
- 22 May – Valentin Iremonger, poet and diplomat (born 1918).
- 25 May – John M. Feehan, author and publisher (born 1916).
- 25 May – Eddie Fullerton, Sinn Féin councillor, killed by the Ulster Defence Association (born 1935).

=== July to December ===
- 18 August – Patrick Joseph Kelly, Bishop of Benin City (born 1894).
- 17 October – J. G. Devlin, actor (born 1907).
- 13 November – Francis Blackwood, 10th Baron Dufferin and Claneboye (born 1916).
- 12 November – Billy Behan, soccer player and Scout (born 1911).
- 14 November – Bryden Thomson, orchestral conductor (born 1928 in Scotland).
- 15 November – George Otto Simms, Church of Ireland Archbishop of Dublin and Archbishop of Armagh (born 1910).
- 19 November – Michael Lyons, Fine Gael TD and Senator (born 1910).
- 1 December – Pat O'Callaghan, athlete and Olympic gold-medallist (born 1905).

== See also ==
- 1991 in Irish television
