= The Guts (novel) =

2013 Irish novel in English by Roddy Doyle

- First edition
- Author: Roddy Doyle
- Language: English
- Genre: Fiction
- Publisher: Jonathan Cape
- Publication date: 2013
- Publication place: Ireland
- Media type: Print hardback
- Pages: 336
- ISBN: 0224098322
- Preceded by: The Barrytown Trilogy

The Guts is a 2013 novel by Irish writer Roddy Doyle. The novel returns to Barrytown where Jimmy Rabbitte, Outspan, and Imelda are 30 years older and have all changed – but not all that much.

== Premise ==
Jimmy Rabbitte is back with some old friends, but time has moved on for all of them. The man who created the soul band, The Commitments, is now forty-seven, with a loving wife, four children, and bowel cancer. He is not dying, he thinks, but he might be.

== Reception ==
The Guts was named Novel of the Year at the 2013 Irish Book Awards in November.
