= London Film Critics Circle Awards 1991 =

British film awards ceremony

12th London Film Critics Circle Awards

1992

Film of the Year:
Thelma & Louise

British Film of the Year:
Life Is Sweet

The 12th London Film Critics Circle Awards, honouring the best in film for 1991, were announced by the London Film Critics Circle in 1992.

== Winners ==
Film of the Year

- Thelma & Louise

British Film of the Year

- Life Is Sweet

Foreign Language Film of the Year

- Cyrano de Bergerac • France

Director of the Year

- Ridley Scott – Thelma & Louise

British Director of the Year

- Alan Parker – The Commitments

Screenwriter of the Year

- David Mamet – Homicide

British Screenwriter of the Year

- Dick Clement, Ian La Frenais and Roddy Doyle – The Commitments

Actor of the Year

- Gérard Depardieu – Cyrano de Bergerac and Green Card

Actress of the Year

- Susan Sarandon – Thelma & Louise and White Palace

British Actor of the Year

- Alan Rickman – Close My Eyes, Truly, Madly, Deeply, Quigley Down Under and Robin Hood: Prince of Thieves

Newcomer of the Year

- Annette Bening – The Grifters, Guilty by Suspicion, Regarding Henry, Valmont and Postcards from the Edge

British Technical Achievement of the Year

- Peter Greenaway – Prospero's Books

British Producer of the Year

- Lynda Myles and Roger Randall-Cutler – The Commitments

Special Achievement Award

- John Sayles

Dilys Powell Award

- Dirk Bogarde
