= The Van (1996 film) =

1996 film by Stephen Frears

- Theatrical poster
- Directed by: Stephen Frears
- Written by: Roddy Doyle
- Based on: The Van by Roddy Doyle
- Produced by: Lynda Myles
- Starring: Colm Meaney; Donal O'Kelly
- Cinematography: Oliver Stapleton
- Edited by: Mick Audsley
- Music by: Eric Clapton; Richard Hartley
- Production companies: BBC Films; Deadly Films; Beacon Pictures
- Distributed by: Fox Searchlight Pictures
- Release dates: May 11, 1996 (Cannes); November 29, 1996 (United Kingdom & Ireland); May 16, 1997 (United States)
- Running time: 100 minutes
- Countries: Ireland; United Kingdom; United States
- Language: English
- Box office: $712,095

The Van is a 1996 film, based on the novel The Van (the third in The Barrytown Trilogy) by Roddy Doyle. Like The Snapper (1993), it was directed by Stephen Frears. The first film of the trilogy, The Commitments (1991), was directed by Alan Parker. It was entered into the 1996 Cannes Film Festival. The film stars Colm Meaney and Donal O'Kelly.

== Plot ==
Brendan "Bimbo" Reeves gets laid off from his job as a baker in Barrytown, a working-class quarter of Dublin. With his redundancy cheque, he buys a van and sells fish and chips with his best mate, Larry. Due, in part, to Ireland's surprising success at the 1990 FIFA World Cup, their business starts off well. The relationship between the two friends soon becomes strained as Bimbo and his wife, Maggie, behave more and more like typical bosses. Larry believes that Maggie is the cause of the strained friendship, as he thinks she is pushing Bimbo away from him. The van is closed down because of poor hygiene by health inspector Des O'Callaghan. Bimbo thinks that Larry told the Health Board about the van, leading to a fight between the two. Larry quits the job, despite Bimbo's best efforts to get him back. Bimbo then drives the van into the sea, so as to regain his friendship with Larry.

== Cast ==
- Colm Meaney as Larry
- Donal O'Kelly as Brendan "Bimbo" Reeves
- Ger Ryan as Maggie
- Caroline Rothwell as Mary
- Neilí Conroy as Diane
- Rúaidhrí Conroy as Kevin
- Brendan O'Carroll as Weslie
- Stuart Dunne as Sam
- Laurie Morton as Maggie's Mum
- Marie Mullen as Vera
- Jon Kenny as Gerry McCarthy

== Production ==
Filming took place in the North Dublin suburb of Kilbarrack, and at Ardmore Studios, Bray, Co. Wicklow.

== Reception ==
Roger Ebert of the Chicago Sun-Times wrote: "When I saw The Van for the first time at the Cannes Film Festival in 1996, I felt it was the least of the three films, and I still do, but it was trimmed of about five minutes of footage after Cannes and, seeing it again a year later, I found it quicker and more alive. It is also the most thoughtful, in a way, and the ending has a poignancy and an unresolved quality that is just right: These disorganised lives would not fit into a neat ending".

Rotten Tomatoes gave the film a score of 40% based on reviews from 20 critics.

It opened in the UK on 29 November 1996 on 94 screens and finished in sixth place for the weekend with a gross of £204,447.
