= The Snapper (novel) =

Novel by Roddy Doyle

- First edition
- Author: Roddy Doyle
- Language: English
- Series: The Barrytown Trilogy
- Genre: Fiction, comedy
- Publisher: Secker & Warburg
- Publication date: 1990
- Publication place: Ireland
- Media type: Print (hardback & paperback)
- Pages: 160
- ISBN: 0-436-20004-X
- Preceded by: The Commitments
- Followed by: The Van

The Snapper (1990) is a novel by Irish writer Roddy Doyle and the second novel in The Barrytown Trilogy.

The plot revolves around unmarried Sharon Rabbitte's pregnancy, and the unexpected effects this has on her conservative, working-class Dublin family.

== Plot Summary ==
When twenty-year-old Sharon informs her father, Jimmy Sr., and mother, Veronica, about her pregnancy, they aren't thrilled but do not display histrionics. Though they ask about the father's identity, Sharon does not tell them. Jimmy Sr. then invites Sharon out to the local pub for a drink.

Sharon's friends are as interested as her family in the father's identity, but she refuses to tell them. Instead, his identity becomes common knowledge when George Burgess, the father of Sharon's friend, Yvonne, leaves his wife and claims to feel torn between her and Sharon: George is the father, the pair have had a sexual encounter while drunk. Sharon briefly questions if the encounter was sexual assault, an interpretation that has found traction among readers. Sharon tells everyone that the father was a Spanish sailor, to avoid the embarrassment and the shame of everybody knowing. However, most of the town believes the truth. She is often criticized and made fun of because of Burgess being the father. Yvonne Burgess shuns her. Jackie, another of Sharon's friends, stands by her, which rekindles their formerly close relationship. The incident temporarily fractures Sharon's relationship with her father and causes her to quit her job as a shelf stacker. Eventually, Burgess returns to his family. Sharon gives birth to a baby girl and considers naming her Georgina.

== Reception ==
The Snapper was published in 1990, before the release of The Commitments movie but after the news that it was being made and frequent coverage and discussion of the film shoot in the Irish media. As such, it was released to significantly more hype and expectation than Doyle's debut. An extract of the novel was published in the Sunday Independent prior to its release. Writing for the Sunday Tribune, Peter Sheridan remarked that "Doyle has an extraordinary comic touch - not since I first delved into Flann O'Brien have I so consistently laughed out loud while reading a book". Kirkus Reviews praised the novel, referring to it as "...warm, frank, and very funny account of family life and pregnancy".

In a review for the Irish Independent, Sean McMahon wrote "what is different about this novel and one written even ten years ago is that church and clergy are non-existent. Religion plays no significant part".

== Adaptations ==
The Snapper was made into a film directed by Stephen Frears and starring Tina Kellegher and Colm Meaney. The film changes the family surname from 'Rabbitte' to 'Curley' due to issues with the rights.

A version for stage premiered to acclaim at Dublin's Gate Theatre in 2018. The stage show was directed by Róisín McBrinn and revived in 2019.

BBC radio broadcast a reading of the entire Barrytown Trilogy in 2013, performed by Jim Sheridan.

== Legacy ==
The book and film of The Snapper are extremely well known in Ireland. In particular the film is shown regularly on television.

Both the film and the book have been reappraised in the wake of the MeToo movement and cancel culture, particularly with regard to how consent is addressed in the texts. Sharon's unplanned pregnancy and her poor memory of the night she got pregnant are central to the book and its comedy, and the significance of whether her encounter with Burgess was consensual or not is critical to the reader's understanding of the book. It is generally held that the film plays this more ambiguously than the book; in the novel she wonders if what happened to her counts as rape. Concerns of this nature about the book were raised at the time by female journalists such as Nuala O'Faolain and Mary Carr.

In 2021, Doyle stated in an interview that he would have dealt with this topic differently now, stating "so much has changed since 1986, when I started writing The Snapper... the legislation on rape is clearer today. As the writer [if I wrote it today], I’d make sure that the sex was consensual, that it wasn’t open to doubt. The novel is about a woman taking ownership of her own story; that wouldn't change". In the same interview he added that Sharon wouldn't have stated that "abortion is murder" so bluntly if it was set today.
