= The Commitments (film) =

1991 film directed by Alan Parker

- Theatrical release poster
- Directed by: Alan Parker
- Screenplay by: Dick Clement; Ian La Frenais; Roddy Doyle
- Based on: The Commitments; 1987 novel by Roddy Doyle
- Produced by: Roger Randall-Cutler; Lynda Myles
- Starring: Robert Arkins; Michael Aherne; Angeline Ball; Maria Doyle; Dave Finnegan; Bronagh Gallagher; Félim Gormley; Glen Hansard; Dick Massey; Johnny Murphy; Kenneth McCluskey; Andrew Strong
- Cinematography: Gale Tattersall
- Edited by: Gerry Hambling
- Production companies: Beacon Pictures; The First Film Company; Dirty Hands Productions
- Distributed by: 20th Century Fox (United States, Canada, United Kingdom and Ireland); Sovereign Pictures (International)
- Release dates: 6 August 1991 (West Hollywood); 14 August 1991 (United States); 4 October 1991 (United Kingdom & Ireland)
- Running time: 118 minutes
- Countries: Ireland; United Kingdom; United States
- Language: English
- Budget: $12–15 million or £5.4 million
- Box office: $14.9 million

The Commitments is a 1991 musical comedy-drama film based on the 1987 novel by Roddy Doyle. It was directed by Alan Parker from a screenplay written by Doyle, Dick Clement and Ian La Frenais. Set in the Northside of Dublin, the film tells the story of Jimmy Rabbitte (Robert Arkins), a young music fanatic who assembles a group of working-class youths to form a soul band named "The Commitments". The film is the first in a series known as The Barrytown Trilogy, followed by The Snapper (1993) and The Van (1996).

Producers Lynda Myles and Roger Randall-Cutler acquired the film rights to the novel in 1988, and commissioned Doyle, a first-time screenwriter, to write an adaptation. Doyle spent one year working on the script before Myles brought in veteran screenwriters Clement and La Frenais to help complete it. Upon reading the novel, Parker signed on as the film's director in 1989. An international co-production between Ireland, the United States and the United Kingdom, The Commitments was the first film produced by Beacon Pictures, which provided an estimated budget of $12–15 million. The film's young lead actors were mostly inexperienced, and were cast because of their musical backgrounds and resemblance to the characters in the novel. Principal photography took place in Dublin, from late August to October, 1990.

The Commitments underperformed at the North American box office, grossing $14.9 million during its theatrical run. Reviewers praised the music, performances and humour, while criticism was occasionally aimed at the pacing and Parker's direction. The film resulted in two soundtrack albums released by MCA Records; the first reached number eight on the Billboard 200 album chart and achieved triple-platinum status, while the second album achieved gold sales status. At the 1992 British Academy Film Awards, the film won four of six BAFTA Awards for Best Film, Best Direction, Best Adapted Screenplay and Best Editing. It also received an Academy Award nomination for Best Film Editing. The film has since gained cult status.

== Plot ==
In the Northside of Dublin, Ireland, Jimmy Rabbitte is a young music fanatic who aspires to manage an Irish soul and rock and roll band in the tradition of 1950s and 60s African-American recording artists. He places an advert in the local newspaper and holds auditions in his parents' home. After being deluged by several unsuitable performers, Jimmy decides to put together a band consisting of friends and people he encounters—lead singer Deco Cuffe, guitarist Outspan Foster, keyboardist Steven Clifford, alto saxophonist Dean Fay, bassist Derek Scully, drummer Billy Mooney, and female backing singers Bernie McGloughlin, Natalie Murphy and Imelda Quirke. Jimmy then meets trumpeter Joey "The Lips" Fagan, a veteran musician who offers his services, and has unlikely stories about meeting and working with famous musicians. Joey names the band "The Commitments".

After purchasing a drum set and acquiring a piano from Steven's grandmother, Jimmy secures the remainder of the band's musical equipment from Duffy, a black market dealer. The band rehearses on the first floor above a snooker hall, and after much practice, they convince a local church community centre to give them a gig, under the pretence of it being an anti-heroin campaign. Jimmy then hires Mickah Wallace, a belligerent and hot-tempered bouncer, to act as the band's security. The band draws a good crowd, but after Deco inadvertently hits Derek with his microphone stand, the amplifiers explode, resulting in a power outage.

Tensions run high among the band members, as Joey seduces Natalie, then Bernie, then Imelda, all while Deco grows increasingly obnoxious and unruly, believing himself to be the star of the band. The band performs at another venue where, at the end of one song, Billy accidentally knocks over his hi-hat cymbals, leading to a heated argument between him and Deco. Billy leaves the band in fear of going to jail if he beats up Deco – much to Jimmy's frustration – and Mickah replaces him as the band's drummer. During the band's next performance at a roller disco, their first paying gig, Jimmy is confronted by Duffy, who demands payment for the equipment he provided the band. Mickah intervenes and violently attacks Duffy, who is escorted out. Jimmy then goes on stage and introduces the band, which elicits boisterous cheers from the audience.

After the band secures another gig, Joey promises Jimmy that he can get his friend Wilson Pickett to sing alongside them. On this promise, Jimmy convinces several journalists to attend the band's next performance. At the venue, the band draws a large crowd, but its members begin arguing with each other offstage, and become doubtful when it appears that Pickett will not show. They go back on stage, where Deco denounces Jimmy for misleading the audience about Pickett's appearance; the band's performance of one of Pickett's songs, "In the Midnight Hour", silences the crowd's protests. After the performance, the fighting continues; during a heated argument, Mickah beats up Deco outside the club, and Jimmy storms off in frustration, claiming that the band is finished. Joey follows Jimmy, who berates him for misleading the band about Pickett. Joey apologizes to Jimmy, and assures him that despite the band breaking up, Jimmy is still a success for helping the others realize their self worth and potential to rise above their previous lot in life. Just as Joey leaves, Pickett's limousine pulls up next to Jimmy, and his driver asks for directions to the club, revealing that Joey was telling the truth about Pickett; he just showed up too late.

In a closing monologue, Jimmy explains that the band's members have since gone their separate ways; Bernie joined a country band, Deco got his record deal and became a bigger egomaniac, Mickah sings for a punk band, Outspan & Derek still play as street buskers, Dean formed a successful jazz band, Joey's mother got a postcard that he was touring with Joe Tex (who had died a decade prior), Steven became a doctor but misses playing music, Billy is recovering from getting kicked in the head by a horse, Imelda married Greg (who won't let her sing anymore), Natalie became a successful solo singer, and implies that she and Jimmy are in a relationship.

== Cast ==
- Robert Arkins as Jimmy Rabbitte – manager
- Michael Aherne as Steven Clifford – piano, keyboards
- Angeline Ball as Imelda Quirke – vocals
- Maria Doyle as Natalie Murphy – vocals
- Dave Finnegan as Mickah Wallace – drums
- Bronagh Gallagher as Bernadette "Bernie" McGloughlin – vocals
- Félim Gormley as Dean Fay – alto saxophone
- Glen Hansard as Outspan Foster – guitars
- Dick Massey as Billy Mooney – drums
- Johnny Murphy as Joey "The Lips" Fagan – trumpet
- Kenneth McCluskey as Derek Scully – bass
- Andrew Strong as Declan "Deco" Cuffe – lead vocals
- Colm Meaney as Mr. Rabbitte
- Anne Kent as Mrs. Rabbitte
- Andrea Corr as Sharon Rabbitte
- Gerard Cassoni as Darren Rabbitte
- Ruth & Lindsay Fairclough as the Rabbitte Twins

In addition, comedian Sean Hughes played Dave from Eejit Records while Maura O'Malley played Joey's mother. Besides Andrea, the other three members of The Corrs appear in the film, with Jim Corr in a credited role and Sharon and Caroline Corr in brief background roles. The film's director, Alan Parker, plays an unnamed producer at Eejit Records at the end of the film. While the Jimmy character regularly voices both sides of his imaginary interview on the Terry Wogan show, Wogan does not appear.

== Production ==
=== Development ===
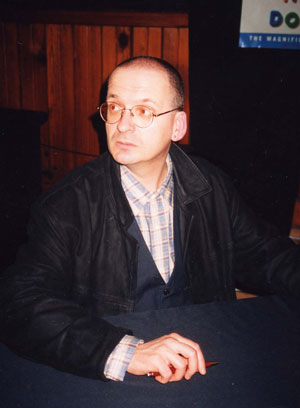
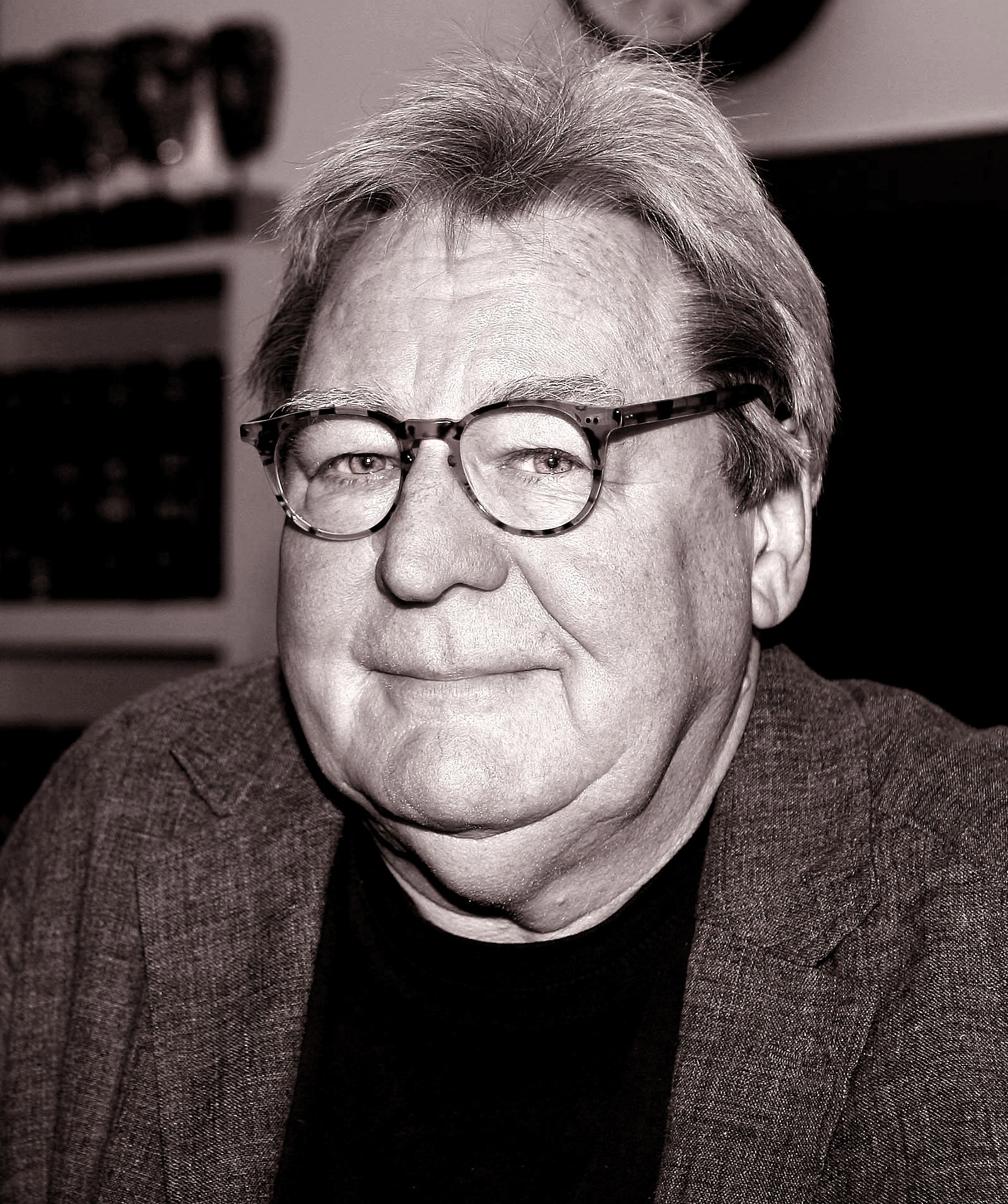
Roddy Doyle (left), who co-wrote the film adaptation of his novel, and Alan Parker, who directed the film.

Following the 1988 publication of Roddy Doyle's novel The Commitments (1987) in the United Kingdom, producers Lynda Myles and Roger Randall-Cutler acquired the film rights, and asked Doyle to write an adaptation. Doyle, an inexperienced screenwriter, spent one year drafting the script, accompanied by Myles and Randall-Cutler. Although a script was completed, Myles felt it needed improvement, and passed the book on to Dick Clement and Ian La Frenais, hoping that they would suggest a more experienced writer. Upon reading the novel, Clement and La Frenais agreed to help write the script themselves.

In 1989, Myles took the project to Beacon Pictures, an independent film company established that year by Armyan Bernstein, a former television journalist turned screenwriter and producer. Clement and La Frenais traveled to Los Angeles to discuss the project with Alan Parker, and gave him a copy of the novel. Upon reading the novel, Parker was intrigued by its dialogue and humour, stating, "The book was all dialogue with very little description, but by the use of this wonderful language, and almost nothing but language, in a few lines [Doyle] was able to make his characters as vivid and strong as a dozen pages of purple Joycian prose." He signed on to direct the project after concluding work on his previous film Come See the Paradise (1990). After Beacon agreed to finance the film, 20th Century Fox acquired the North American and UK distribution rights, and Parker was given creative control. The film was an international co-production between companies in the United Kingdom and the United States. Randall-Cutler's The First Film Company and Parker's Dirty Hands Productions, both based in England, were enlisted as production companies. Parker and the producers later attended the 1990 Cannes Film Festival to secure worldwide pre-sales.

=== Casting ===
Casting directors John and Ros Hubbard travelled to Dublin, Ireland in April 1990 and spent two months visiting local clubs in their search for musicians to appear in the film. In June of that year, Parker travelled to Dublin and placed an advertisement in the magazine Hot Press, requesting young artists to audition for roles in the film. Parker wanted actors who could play a musical instrument and resembled the characters from the novel. He said, "I would stop kids busking on the streets and call them in to audition ... we had to choose kids who were quite talented, because they had to play musicians who were awful at first, but gradually improved."

Auditions were first held at The Waterfront, a nightclub located near the River Liffey. Jim Corr and his sisters Andrea Corr, Sharon Corr and Caroline Corr were among those who auditioned. Andrea was cast in the non-musical role of Sharon Rabbitte, Jimmy's younger sister, while Sharon and Caroline were cast as members of an Irish band known as "Country & Western"; Jim appears in a brief role as a member of the band "Avant-Garde-A-Clue". Parker then held a casting call at the Mansion House on Dawson Street, Dublin, where 1,500 people auditioned for various roles. During the auditions, Parker met Andrew Strong, son of the film's vocal coach Rob Strong, who performed "Mustang Sally". After meeting with Parker to discuss the project, Strong secured the role of Deco Cuffe, the lead singer of The Commitments. Robert Arkins was initially considered for the role of Deco before he was ultimately cast as Jimmy Rabbitte. Although his character does not have a singing part in the film, Arkins performs the song "Treat Her Right" during the opening credits.

For the role of Joey "the Lips" Fagan, the eldest member of the band, Parker and La Frenais wanted veteran musician Van Morrison. Although his meeting with Parker did not go well, Morrison offered his songs for use in the film. Rory Gallagher was also considered before veteran film and stage actor Johnny Murphy secured the role. Although Murphy could not play an instrument, Parker felt that he best captured the essence of both the character and the film. Murphy was the only cast member who did not do his own playing in the film. Bronagh Gallagher, another established actor, was cast as Bernie McGloughlin, one of the band's three backup singers known as "The Commitmentettes". The actress, born in Derry, Northern Ireland, had to learn a Dublin accent for the role. Angeline Ball secured the role of Imelda Quirke after a private audition with the Hubbards.

Maria Doyle Kennedy was a member of the Irish quartet band The Black Velvet Band before she was cast as Commitmentette singer Natalie Murphy. Michael Aherne, who plays The Commitments' pianist Steven Clifford, was an employee of the Dublin Corporation and took a three-month leave of absence to make the film. Future Oscar-winner Glen Hansard, the lead singer of The Frames, was cast as Outspan Foster, the band's guitarist.

Dave Finnegan was cast as Mickah Wallace, a belligerent and hot-tempered bouncer who becomes a drummer for the band. Parker's first meeting with Finnegan began civilly before their exchanges grew more and more heated. They soon became verbally abusive, threatening each other with disturbing acts of violence. Parker cast Finnegan immediately, explaining that he simply wanted to test the limits of Finnegan's aggression, as he wanted the truculence of the character to be convincing. Colm Meaney first learned of the film adaptation while working with Parker on Come See the Paradise. After Parker held auditions for the younger cast members, Meaney secured the role of Jimmy's father Jimmy Rabbitte Sr. The audition scene in the film, in which various musicians audition at Jimmy Rabbitte's home, required more than 100 band members. Peter Rowen, brother of Irish artist Guggi, appears as a young skateboarding boy who asks to audition for the band. At the time of the film's production, Rowen had appeared on the cover art of U2's albums Boy (1980) and War (1983), and was a national skating champion.

=== Filming ===
Parker spent five weeks rehearsing with the cast members before principal photography commenced on 27 August 1990, with an estimated budget of $12–15 million. While Doyle's novel is set in the fictional Barrytown (based on Kilbarrack, where Doyle was a schoolteacher), Parker suggested that the film take place in Dublin. A total of 44 locations in the city were used for filming. Cinematographer Gale Tattersall sought to create "a gritty, ugly look" that would become more composed and polished as the band became more successful. He felt that this visual style would support the film's story arc.

The film's opening scene, depicting Jimmy Rabbitte trying to offload cassettes and shirts in a street market, was filmed on Sheriff Street, in front of the St. Lawrence O'Toole Catholic Church. A house located on Darndale in the Northside of Dublin was used to depict the Rabbitte family home. The home where Joey "the Lips" Fagan resides with his mother was a house located at 118 Pembroke Road in Ballsbridge. The production also filmed scenes at Ricardo's Pool Hall, a dilapidated building located at 84–87 Lower Camden Street. The second floor of the pool hall was used to depict the band's rehearsals. The Archbishop Byrne Hall (also known as St. Kevin's Hall), located in the Portobello district of Dublin, was used to depict a local church community centre, where The Commitments first perform on stage. The Saint Francis Xavier Church, Dublin, located on Upper Gardiner Street, was used to film a scene in which Jimmy finds Commitments pianist Steven Clifford playing "A Whiter Shade of Pale" on an organ. The production team also filmed a scene at a Phibsborough bus depot; the location was used to depict Jimmy convincing Deco to become a part of the band. A walkway, where Jimmy discusses his plan to form a band with Outspan and Derek was filmed at the Kilbarrack D.A.R.T. Station. Principal photography concluded in mid-October 1990 after 53 days of filming.

=== Music ===
The Commitments does not have an original film score, but features existing music tracks. Music supervisor G. Marq Roswell spent several months during the film's pre-production listening to and categorising hundreds of R&B songs before travelling to Dublin to help Parker finalise songs that would be used in the film. Parker and Roswell had created a "short list" of 1,000 possible song choices. From May to June 1990, Parker had listened to more than 300 songs from the 1960s before narrowing his choices down to 75 songs. The finished film features 68 different musical cues and 52 songs. 24 songs were chosen by the director to be performed by the cast. Roswell also organised and oversaw the recording sessions. The songs were recorded live on set, as Parker wanted to capture the reality of the band's rehearsals and performances. The filmmakers used out-of-phase speakers, which enabled them to play pre-recorded tracks at maximum volume, creating a live performance atmosphere. Each song was then recorded onto a 24-track recorder.

== Soundtracks ==
A motion picture soundtrack album with music produced by Kevin Killen and Paul Bushnell was released on 13 August 1991, by MCA Records. The soundtrack features fourteen songs, most of which appeared in various scenes in the film. Niamh Kavanagh performed as both a lead and backing vocalist in songs such as "Destination Anywhere" and "Do Right Woman, Do Right Man". According to The Daily Telegraph, the first soundtrack has sold 12 million copies worldwide.

After the commercial success of the first soundtrack album, a follow-up entitled The Commitments, Vol. 2: Music From The Original Motion Picture Soundtrack was released on 17 March 1992. The album included four more songs from the film, as well as seven additional songs performed by the cast.

In 2007, Geffen Records released a 2-CD Deluxe Edition of the soundtrack, which collects The Commitments (Original Motion Picture Soundtrack) and The Commitments, Vol. 2: Music From The Original Motion Picture Soundtrack, as well as five tracks from cast member Andrew Strong's 1993 solo album Strong.

== Release ==
=== Strategy ===
20th Century Fox felt that The Commitments would attract young adult audiences, but test screenings indicated that the film would appeal more to older viewers, due to its musical content. Parker, a former advertising executive, collaborated with the studio on the film's marketing, running an extensive campaign to attract the intended target audience. Theatrical posters for the film were distributed to exhibitors in February 1991. Beginning in April 1991, Fox arranged several screenings in Toronto, New York City, San Francisco, Los Angeles and Chicago, with audience members being music industry executives, journalists, disc jockeys and club owners. In August 1991, the studio hosted a press junket in Dublin, Ireland for several media outlets. The Commitments premiered at the Pacific Design Center in West Hollywood, California on 6 August 1991, the Cinerama Dome Theatre in Hollywood on 7 August 1991, the Cineplex Odeon Century Plaza Cinemas in Century City, Los Angeles on 13 August 1991, and the Savoy Cinema in Dublin, Ireland on 19 September 1991.

Fox gave The Commitments a platform release which involved opening the film in select cities before expanding distribution in the following weeks. The film had a limited release in New York City, Los Angeles, and Ireland on 14 August 1991, and expanded to Toronto, San Francisco and Chicago on 16 August 1991. The film was released nationwide in North America on 13 September 1991, and Ireland on 4 October 1991. The English-based studio Sovereign Pictures handled distribution outside North America except the United Kingdom and Ireland where Fox also handled distribution.

=== Box office ===
The Commitments grossed $271,333 on its first week of limited release in North America—an average of $33,916 per theatre. The film grossed an additional $268,653 in its second weekend, with an overall domestic gross of $775,824. More theatres were added in its third week; the film grossed an additional $1,366,223 from 104 theatres, which was a +409% increase from its second weekend. The following week, the film was released to a total of 555 theatres in the United States and Canada. It grossed $2,511,091, securing the number three position at the domestic box office. The film saw a significant drop in attendance during the following week, the film grossed $1,752,234, a 30.2% overall decrease from the previous weekend. After eight weeks of release, The Commitments ended its theatrical run with an overall gross of $14,919,570. In North America, it was the 80th highest-grossing film of 1991 and the 42nd highest-grossing R-rated film of that year.

The film was the highest-grossing film in Ireland of all time with a gross of IR£2.23 million ($3.5 million). It grossed £8,285,701 in the UK.

=== Home media ===
In North America, The Commitments was released on VHS on 9 April 1992 by FoxVideo, Inc. To promote the release, FoxVideo distributed 90,000 videocassette copies of a "making-of" featurette to home video retailers. The featurette was made available to consumers as a free rental. FoxVideo spent an estimated $300,000 on the marketing, and an additional $200,000 promoting the featurette using print and broadcast advertising.

A Region 1 DVD was released on 19 August 2003, by 20th Century Fox Home Entertainment. The DVD presents the film in standard definition. Special features include a making-of featurette, a music video for the song "Treat Her Right", a theatrical trailer, and CD sampler that plays four songs from the motion picture soundtrack. A two-disc special edition DVD was later released on 16 March 2004. The first disc presents the film in widescreen, and features an audio commentary by Parker. Other special features include the theatrical trailer, the "Treat Her Right" music video with optional introductions by Parker and Robert Arkins, three featurettes, six TV spots for the film, four radio spots, and a still gallery.

The Commitments was released on Blu-ray on 30 August 2016 by RLJ Entertainment, coinciding with the film's 25th anniversary. The Blu-ray presents the film in 1080p high definition, and contains all the additional materials found on the Special Edition DVD, as well as new interviews with Parker and the cast, and a collective booklet featuring production notes written by Parker.

== Reception ==
=== Critical response ===
The Commitments received mostly positive reviews. Review aggregator Rotten Tomatoes sampled 53 reviews, and gave the film an approval rating of 91%, with an average score of 7.4/10. The critical consensus reads, "The Commitments is a vibrantly funny and blissfully heartfelt ode to the power of music". It is also ranked sixth on the website's best reviewed films of 1991. On Metacritic, the film has a score of 73 out of 100 based on reviews from 23 critics, indicating "generally favorable reviews". Roddy Doyle, author of the 1987 novel, praised the film, stating that Parker and the filmmakers did a "terrific job".

Variety magazine called the film "well-executed and original", and praised the performances as well as the editing by Gerry Hambling. Jonathan Rosenbaum of the Chicago Reader wrote, "If [Parker] can't resist the occasional fancy or cutesy flourishes ... that tend to compromise his work, he still allows his material to exist on its own level and makes it fun to watch." Hal Hinson of The Washington Post described the film as "a deadly funny movie; nearly every scene is broken off with a punch line. But Parker's sense of comedy is organic; he never lets the jokes elbow the characters, or the music, out of the spotlight." Kenneth Turan of the Los Angeles Times also praised Parker's direction, writing, " ... Parker has loosened up quite a bit here, not forcing the action as much as he did in the similar Fame and bringing a surprisingly loony touch to characters like Jimmy's Elvis-obsessed father." Time magazine reviewer Richard Corliss wrote, "The film offers no message, no solutions, only a great time at the movies."

Roger Ebert of the Chicago Sun-Times wrote that the film was "filled with life and energy, and the music is honest." On the syndicated television program Siskel & Ebert At the Movies, Ebert gave the film a "Thumbs Up" rating, while his colleague Gene Siskel gave the film a "Thumbs Down". Siskel, writing for the Chicago Tribune, felt that the film was "a joyful but empty mixture of Irish kids and black American soul music". In his review for Entertainment Weekly, Owen Gleiberman criticised the overall premise as being "downright insulting", explaining, "In Parker's hands, soul music becomes little more than a self-serving metaphor – an easy symbol for 'commitment' and integrity." Peter Travers of Rolling Stone criticised the storytelling, writing in his review, " ... the predictable way in which the band's nine men and three women argue about music, sex and fame robs the story of urgency." Janet Maslin of The New York Times stated, "The Commitments becomes repetitive after a while, since so much of it is about the group's stage show, and since the effort to create an off-stage story never really works." David Denby of New York Magazine felt that the film has "a raspy surface authenticity and a great deal of affection for its characters and milieu but not much dramatic interest."

=== Accolades ===
The Commitments received various awards and nominations in categories ranging from recognition of the film itself to its writing, direction, editing and sound to the supporting performance of Andrew Strong. In September 1990, the film debuted at the 4th Tokyo International Film Festival, where it competed for the "Tokyo Grand Prix Award" and was nominated for the Best Director Award, with Parker winning in the latter category. In January 1992, the film received a Golden Globe Award nomination for Best Motion Picture – Musical or Comedy though it failed to win the award at the 49th Golden Globe Awards, losing to the animated feature Beauty and the Beast. On 19 February 1992, The Commitments received one Academy Award nomination for Best Film Editing, but lost to JFK at the 64th Academy Awards ceremony on 30 March 1992. At the 45th British Academy Film Awards, the film received six nominations, and won four for Best Film, Best Direction, Best Adapted Screenplay and Best Editing.

List of awards and nominations
Award	Category	Nominees	Result
64th Academy Awards	Best Film Editing	Gerry Hambling	Nominated
49th Golden Globe Awards	Best Motion Picture – Musical or Comedy	————	Nominated
45th British Academy Film Awards	Best Film	————	Won
45th British Academy Film Awards	Best Direction	Alan Parker	Won
45th British Academy Film Awards	Best Adapted Screenplay	Dick Clement, Ian La Frenais, Roddy Doyle	Won
45th British Academy Film Awards	Best Editing	Gerry Hambling	Won
45th British Academy Film Awards	Best Supporting Actor	Andrew Strong	Nominated
45th British Academy Film Awards	Best Sound	Clive Winter, Eddy Joseph, Andy Nelson, Tom Perry, Steve Pederson	Nominated
34th Australian Film Institute Awards	Best Foreign Film	Roger Randall-Cutler, Lynda Myles	Nominated
1992 Brit Awards	Best Soundtrack	————	Won
1991 Evening Standard British Film Awards	Peter Sellers Award for Comedy	Dick Clement, Ian La Frenais, Roddy Doyle	Won
12th London Film Critics Circle Awards	British Producer of the Year	Roger Randall-Cutler, Lynda Myles	Won
12th London Film Critics Circle Awards	British Director of the Year	Alan Parker	Won
12th London Film Critics Circle Awards	British or Irish Screenwriter of the Year	Dick Clement, Ian La Frenais, Roddy Doyle	Won
1992 Writers Guild of America Awards	Best Adapted Screenplay	Dick Clement, Ian La Frenais, Roddy Doyle	Nominated
4th Tokyo International Film Festival	Tokyo Grand Prix Award	————	Nominated
4th Tokyo International Film Festival	Best Director Award	Alan Parker	Won

== Legacy and aftermath ==
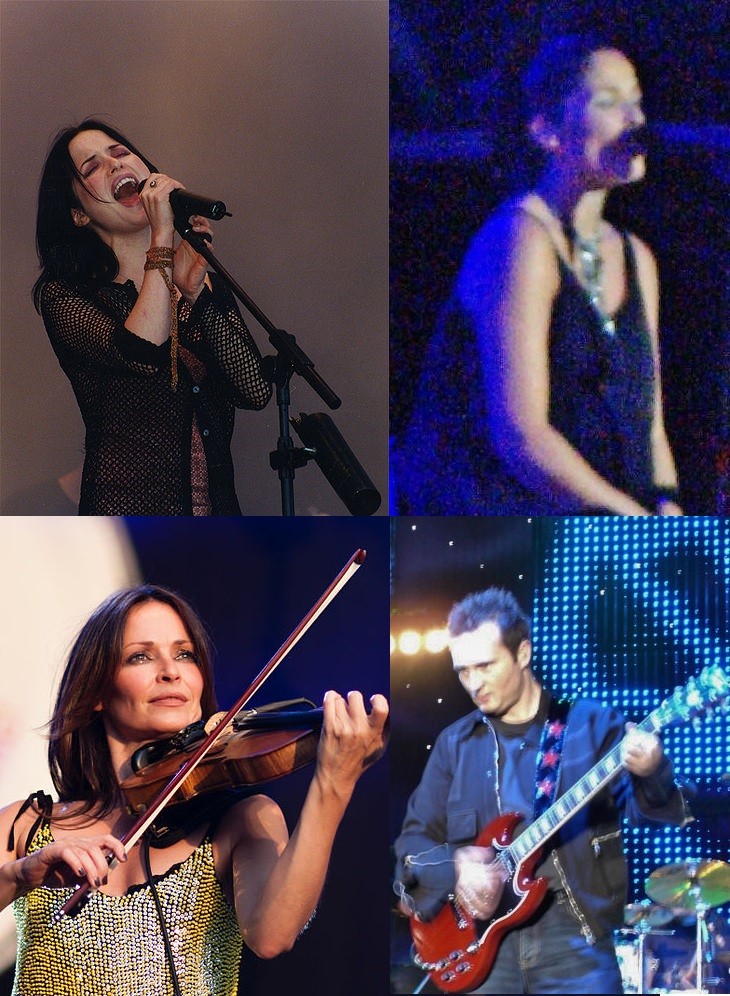
Clockwise from top left: Siblings Andrea, Caroline, Jim and Sharon Corr achieved international stardom with their band The Corrs after the film's release.

The Commitments has gained cult status, and is regarded as one of the best Irish films. An image of four of the actors, in character, was on an Irish postage stamp as part of the Ireland 1996: Irish Cinema Centenary series issued by An Post; the image includes lead singer Deco Cuffe (Andrew Strong), along with the three "Commitmentettes" – Imelda Quirke (Angeline Ball), Natalie Murphy (Maria Doyle Kennedy) and Bernie McGloughlin (Bronagh Gallagher). In 1999, the British Film Institute ranked the film at number 38 on its list of the "100 best British films of the century", based on votes from 1,000 leading figures of the film industry. In 2005, a poll conducted by Jameson and The Dubliner ranked The Commitments the "Best Irish Film of All time", based on 10,000 votes. Following the film's release, the novel also gained popularity, becoming Doyle's most well-known work, which the author resented. "I dismissed The Commitments for a long, long time to the extent I forgot I had anything to do with it", he said.

Many of the actors went on to pursue various acting and musical careers. Robert Arkins signed a record deal with MCA Records in 1993, although he did not finish recording the consequent album. He has produced work for a number of commercial clients, television projects, and composed music for two short films. Andrew Strong went on to produce several albums, which he described as having elements of R&B and rock. He has performed alongside The Rolling Stones, Elton John and Ray Charles, and formed his own band, The Bone Yard Boys, in 2003. In 1993, two of the film's cast members, Kenneth McCluskey and Dick Massey, formed their own tribute act band, The Stars from the Commitments. The 9-piece band has since played more than 1,000 shows worldwide, and has played with B.B. King, James Brown and Wilson Pickett.

Siblings Andrea, Jim, Sharon and Caroline Corr, who had minor supporting roles, had only recently formed their family quartet, performing in their aunt's pub as The Corrs; the film's music coordinator, John Hughes, noticed them when they auditioned for the film and agreed to become their manager. The band has since achieved international stardom, releasing six studio albums and selling more than 60 million records worldwide. Andrea would again collaborate with Parker on his film adaptation of the musical Evita. Glen Hansard continued performing with his band, The Frames, and achieved greater success and critical acclaim with the 2005 film Once. Bronagh Gallagher has since enjoyed a lengthy acting career in film and television and Maria Doyle Kennedy has, to date, released eleven studio albums and has gone on to become an award-winning actress. Michael Aherne is the only cast member to have not pursued an acting career after the film's release.

On 6 October 2010, it was announced that Strong, Arkins, Ball, Gallagher, Aherne, Hansard, Félim Gormley and Dave Finnegan would join The Stars from The Commitments for a reunion tour to celebrate the film's 20th anniversary. Donations from every ticket sold were given to the Irish Cancer Society, with a goal of raising €30,000. The cast performed at The Royal Theatre, in Castlebar, County Mayo on 14 March 2011, Ireland's National Events Centre (INEC) in Killarney, County Kerry on 15 March 2011, The Odyssey, in Belfast on 17 March 2011, and The O2 in Dublin on 19 March 2011.

=== The Barrytown Trilogy ===
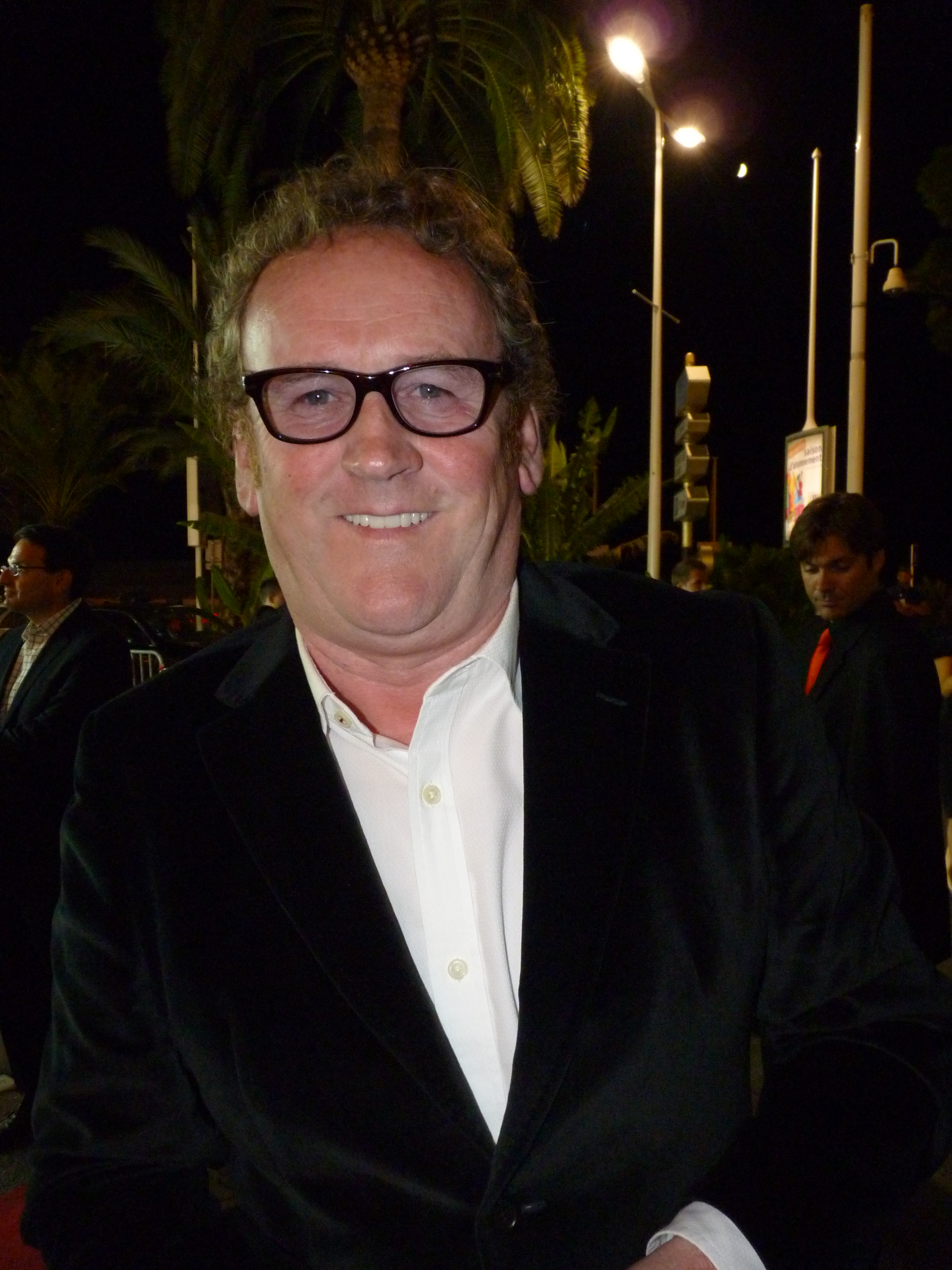
Colm Meaney has appeared in all three films based on Doyle's Barrytown Trilogy of novels.

The Commitments is the first book in Doyle's series known as The Barrytown Trilogy, followed by The Snapper (1990) and The Van (1991). While all three novels focus on the Rabbitte family, Doyle expressed that he was not interested in writing or producing sequels to the 1991 film adaptation, stating, "I hope it's never made. I just think that, whereas The Commitments was very much a labour of love, Commitments 2 is definitely an act of cynicism."

Doyle was given creative freedom by the BBC over the adaptation of The Snapper, for which he wrote the screenplay. Lynda Myles returned to produce the film and hired Stephen Frears as its director. Colm Meaney returned in a supporting role. The adaptation was originally planned as a television film before Frears suggested that it be transferred to film. Doyle disagreed with the change, stating, "I didn't like it on the big screen—I thought it was grainy." The Snapper (1993) premiered at the 1993 Cannes Film Festival, where it received a standing ovation. It was a critical success, receiving largely positive reviews.

For the film adaptation of The Van, Doyle and Myles formed their own production company, Deadly Films, and the author was given creative control over the selection of its cast and director. Frears returned as director, and Meaney was cast in the lead role. Although The Van (1996) premiered at the 1996 Cannes Film Festival to some favourable reviews, critical reaction was negative upon release; reviewers criticised the film for its thin material and lack of strong characterisation.

=== Cancelled sequel ===
In January 2000, it was announced that Harvey Weinstein had acquired the film rights to the novel for Miramax and commissioned playwright Warren Leight to write a direct sequel to The Commitments, with Cathy Konrad attached as a producer. The premise involved several members of The Commitments pairing with new band members before going on tour in the United States. The sequel was never produced.

=== Stage production ===
Doyle's novel inspired a 2013 musical stage production, directed by British theatre director Jamie Lloyd. Following the film's success, Doyle had previously turned down offers to adapt his novel into a stage production. The Commitments began previews on 21 September 2013 in London's West End at the Palace Theatre. Its official opening night was on 8 October 2013. The show had more than 1,000 performances before officially closing in London on 1 November 2015. It was announced that a United Kingdom and Ireland tour would commence in 2017.

== See also ==
- BFI Top 100 British films
