= Love (Doyle novel) =

2020 novel by Roddy Doyle

- First edition
- Author: Roddy Doyle
- Genre: Fiction
- Publisher: Jonathan Cape
- Publication date: 21 May 2020
- Pages: 336 pages
- ISBN: 978-1984880451

Love is a 2020 novel by Irish author Roddy Doyle. The novel takes place in Dublin, mostly in a pub, and concerns two friends, Joe and Davy, who have reconnected for a night of drinking.

== Publication ==
Publication of the novel in Doyle's native Ireland was pushed from June 2020 to October.

== Reception ==
Kirkus Reviews gave the novel a negative review, writing that "By the time the novel belatedly reaches the big reveal, the reader has passed the point of caring."
