= The Commitments (musical) =

Musical written by Roddy Doyle

- The Saviours of Soul
- Official poster of London Production
- Music: Various
- Lyrics: Various
- Book: Roddy Doyle
- Basis: 1987 novel The Commitments
- Premiere: 8 October 2013: Palace Theatre, London
- Productions: 2013 West End; 2016 UK and Ireland tour 2021 UK and Ireland tour

The Commitments, also called The Commitments: The Saviours of Soul, is a jukebox musical written by Roddy Doyle, based on the 1987 novel of the same name, also written by Doyle. Like the novel (and its 1991 film adaptation), the musical is about a group of unemployed Irish youths who start a soul music band. It premiered in 2013 at the Palace Theatre in London's West End.

The music within the musical consists of soul and rock & roll classics from the 1950s and 60s, including "Think", "(I Can't Get No) Satisfaction", "Papa Was a Rollin' Stone" and "Night Train". The music is entirely diegetic, meaning that all the songs are performed by the band rather than being sung by characters to express an emotion. For that reason, Doyle has insisted that The Commitments is not a jukebox musical.

== Background ==
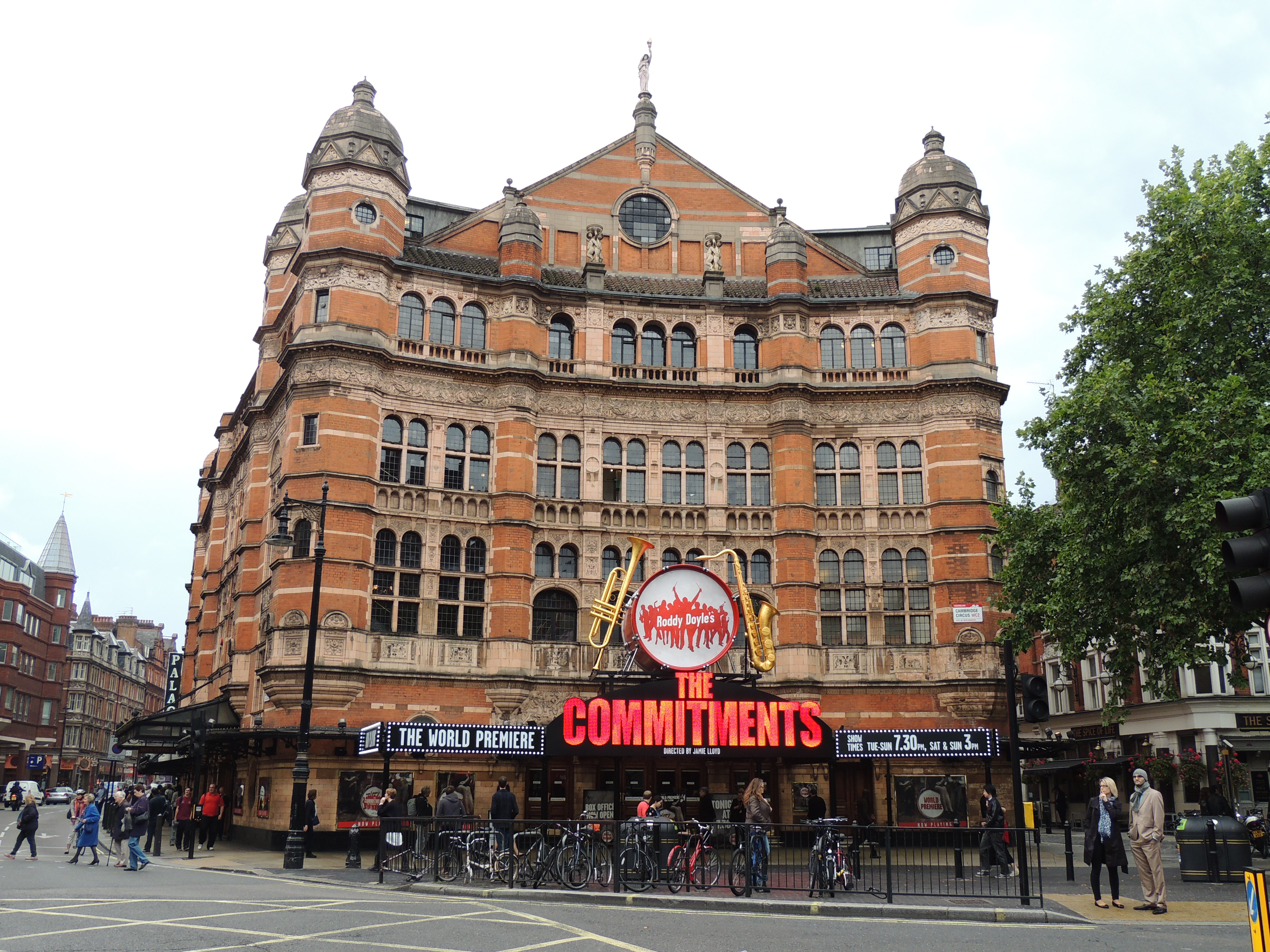
The Commitments at the Palace Theatre, London

The musical is based on the 1987 novel, by Roddy Doyle. Following the 1991 film adaptation, Doyle said he received 20 different offers to turn the novel into a musical. He turned them all down because he had become resentful of the success of The Commitments, to the seeming exclusion of his other novels and because he was not a fan of musical theatre, having never seen a musical. He eventually changed his mind due to his children, who were fans of the 1991 film, and who took him to see musicals, including a production of the film-turned-musical The Producers, which he called "a revelation".

Officially confirmed on 19 April 2013, in Ireland, producers announced that the show would play the Palace Theatre, with tickets going on sale everywhere on 23 April. Despite initially looking to hire another writer to write the book for the musical, Doyle ended up writing the show himself. The show was directed by Jamie Lloyd, with choreography by Ann Yee, set design by Soutra Gilmour, sound design by Rory Madden and lightning by Jon Clark.

== Production history ==
=== West End (2013–2015) ===
The Commitments began previews on 21 September 2013, at the Palace Theatre, London, before holding its official opening night on 8 October. The cast consisted of Denis Grindel as Jimmy Rabbitte, Killian Donnelly as Deco, Ben Fox as Joey Fagan, Sean Kearns as Jimmy Rabbitte's father and Sarah O'Connor, Stephanie McKeon and Jessica Cervi played The Commitmentettes. A typical London performance ran 2hrs 25mins, including one interval of 15 mins. The show closed on 1 November 2015.

=== UK and Ireland tour (2016–2017) ===
Another tour commenced in 2016. The production officially opened at Dublin's Bord Gáis Energy Theatre in October, and closed at the Bradford Alhambra Theatre on May 13, 2017. It featured a number of cast members from the West End production, including original cast members Brian Gilligan as Deco and Andrew Linnie as Jimmy. Kevin Kennedy, best known as Curly Watts from Coronation Street, joined the cast as Jimmy's Da. The production was directed by C Jay Ranger.

=== UK and Ireland tour (2022–2023) ===
The show began a UK and Ireland tour opening at the Churchill Theatre, Bromley in September 2022, after previously being postponed from September 2020 due to the COVID-19 pandemic. The production is directed by Andrew Linnie who previously played Dean in the London production and Jimmy in the previous tour.

== Musical numbers ==
The musical features nineteen main songs with a further nineteen short sound bites of soul and motown numbers.

Main songs

- "You Keep Me Hangin' On"
- "Knock On Wood"
- "In The Midnight Hour"
- "What Becomes of the Brokenhearted"
- "I Never Loved a Man (The Way I Love You)" (now cut)
- "I Heard It Through the Grapevine"
- "Reach Out I'll Be There"
- "I Take What I Want" (now cut)
- "I Can't Turn You Loose"
- "Think"
- "Thin Line Between Love and Hate"
- "Save Me"
- "(I Can't Get No) Satisfaction"
- "Papa Was a Rollin' Stone"
- "Night Train"
- "Mr. Pitiful"
- "Uptight (Everything's Alright)"
- "Mustang Sally"
- "River Deep Mountain High"
- "Land of a Thousand Dances"
- "Treat Her Right"
- "Try a Little Tenderness"

Featured songs

- "Master and Servant"
- "Blue Monday"
- "Don't You Want Me"
- "Whiskey in the Jar"
- "McDonald's Girl"
- "Brass in Pocket"
- "We Don't Have to Take Our Clothes Off"
- "Relax"
- "Addicted to Love"
- "New Year's Day"
- "I Want to Take You Higher"
- "I Wanna Be Your Dog"
- "Tubular Bells"
- "All You Need Is Love"
- "Moon River"
- "Courtin' In The Kitchen" (now cut)
- "Jimmy Jimmy" (now cut)
- "Rudy, A Message to You"
- "Bring It On Home to Me"

== Principal roles and cast members ==
Character (Note: Listed in order of appearance.)	Original London cast (2013)	UK and Ireland cast (2016)	UK and Ireland cast (2022)
Bernie	Jessica Cervi	Christina Tedders	Sarah Gardiner
Deco	Killian Donnelly (Note: The role of Deco was played by Ian McIntosh at Tuesday and Sunday evening performances.)	Brian Gilligan	Ian Mcintosh
Derek	Mark Dugdale	Peter Mooney	Guy Freeman
Joey Fagan	Ben Fox	Alex McMorran	Stuart Reed
Billy/Dave	Brian Gilligan	John Currivan	Ryan Kelly
Jimmy Rabbitte	Denis Grindel	Andrew Linnie	James Killeen
Dean	Andrew Linnie	Padraig Dooney	Conor Litten
Natalie	Stephanie McKeon	Amy Penston	Eve Kitchingman
Imelda	Sarah O'Connor	Leah Penston	Ciara Mackey
James	Barnaby Southgate	Rhys Whitfield	Stephen O’Ríain
Mickah	Joe Woolmer	Sam Fordham	Ronnie Yorke
Outspan	Matthew Wycliffe	Christian James	Michael Mahony
Sap	Padraig Dooney	Guy Freeman	Callum Martin
Auditionees	Christopher Fry, John McLarnon, Sharon Sexton, Alex Tomkins		Alice Croft, Maryann Lynch, Ed Thorpe, James Deegan
Dodgy Man	Ryan Gibb		
Jimmy's Da	Sean Kearns	Kevin Kennedy	Nigel Pivaro
Sharon	Clodagh Long		
Ray	Ian McIntosh	Ben Morris	
Alice	Riona O'Connor		
Hot Press	Thomas Snowdon	Joshua Barton	Colm Gleeson
Barman	Glenn Spears	Joshua Barton	Joshua Barton
Jimmy's Ma/Outspan's Ma	Julia Worsley		
Resident Choreographer	Natalie Hope		

== Awards and nominations ==
Year	Award	Category	Nominee	Result	Ref
2013	Evening Standard Award	Best Night Out		Nominated	
2014	Whatsonstage.com Awards	Best Actor in a Musical	Killian Donnelly	Nominated	

== Critical reception ==
The West End production of The Commitments received mixed reviews from critics.
