= Lynda Myles (British producer) =

British writer and producer (born 1947)

- Born: 2 May 1947 (age 78); Arbroath, Angus, Scotland, UK
- Occupation: Film producer
- Years active: 1983–present

Lynda Myles (born 2 May 1947) is a British writer and producer. She is most well known for her work as the director of the Edinburgh International Film Festival and for producing film adaptions of Irish writer Roddy Doyle's The Barrytown Trilogy: 1991's The Commitments, 1993's The Snapper, and 1996's The Van.

== Career ==
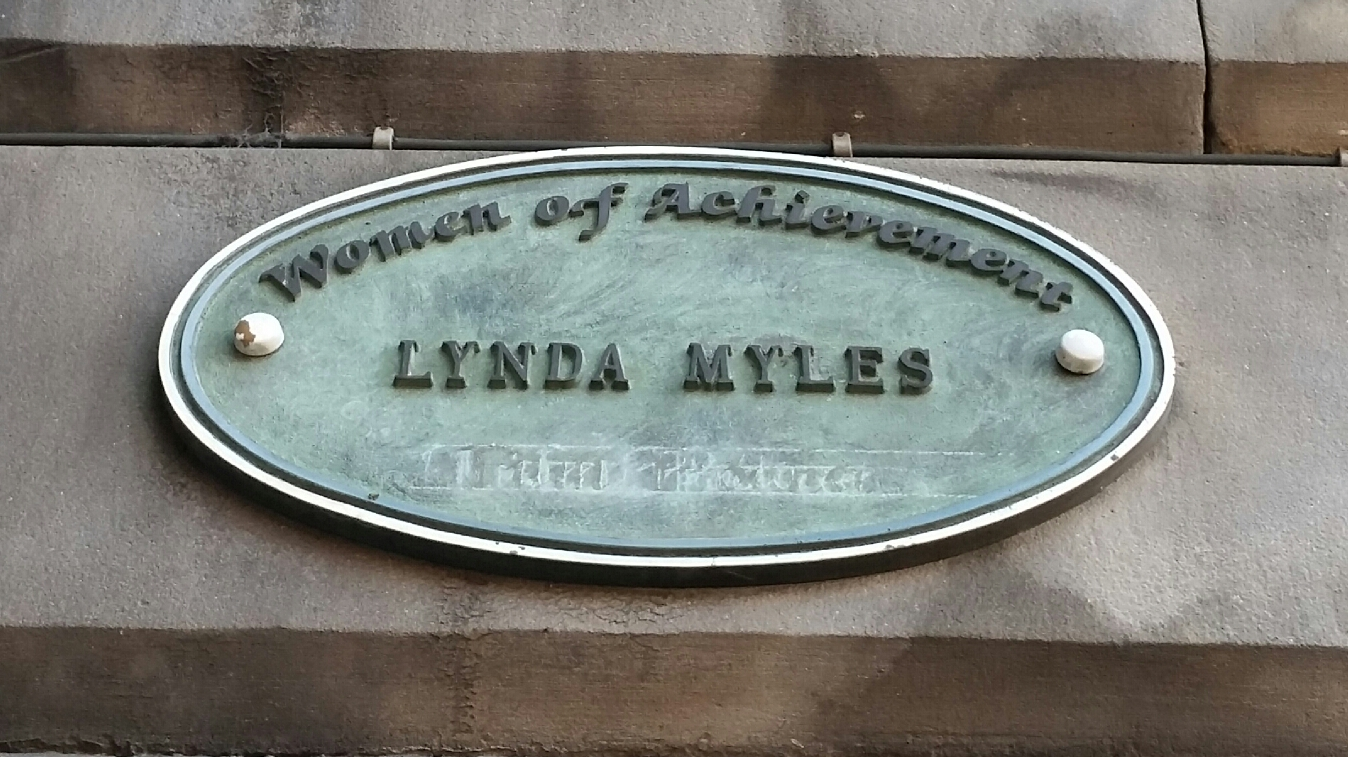
Filmhouse Cinema plaque, Edinburgh

As a student at University of Edinburgh, Myles was active in Edinburgh University Film Society. On 4 September 1967, Myles and her then boyfriend, David Will, wrote a letter to the editor of The Scotsman newspaper that was critical of the Edinburgh International Film Festival. The students were invited to work with festival director Murray Grigor, which they did, with great impact, as their focus was on auteurs like Samuel Fuller and other influential American New Wave filmmakers.

From Spring 1968 onwards, Myles began working at Edinburgh International Film Festival, first in programming, and then as a deputy editor of the festival. From 1973 to 1980, she was director of the festival. She was the first woman director of a film festival.

In 1979, together with Michael Pye, Lynda Myles coined the term 'the movie brats' which came to define a new generation of American film-makers, nurtured by watching and studying popular films themselves rather than by theatre or industry apprenticeship. It was this generation whose work Myles had championed in her role at the Edinburgh Film Festival. The term went into common usage, and was recently quoted by Steven Spielberg in several interviews regarding his work. The argument underlying the phrase was made in her and Pye's study of this generation.

She was director and curator of film at the Pacific Film Archive, University of California, Berkeley for two years.

She was Senior Vice–President at Columbia Pictures.

Myles was appointed Commissioning Editor for Drama at the BBC for two years.

From 1990 to 1994, Myles was co-executive director of the East-West Producers' Seminar, a training program for young producers in Eastern Europe.

In 1991, Myles co-produced the first of three films in Roddy Doyle's The Barrytown Trilogy, The Commitments. She continued to work as an independent producer, making the second and third films in The Barrytown Trilogy, The Snapper and The Van.

Myles served on the Board of Governors of the British Film Institute in the 1990s.

Myles produced the 1997 film of Simon Donald's play, The Life of Stuff for BBC Films.

In 2000, she produced Roddy Doyle's film When Brendan Met Trudy for BBC Films.

Myles co-produced Chen Kaige's 2002 film, Killing Me Softly, for the Montecito Picture Company.

Since 2004, Myles has been the Head of the Fiction Department at National Film and Television School outside London.

== Filmography ==
As Producer unless noted

- 1983: Sean Connery's Edinburgh
- 1984: Flight To Berlin – Associate Producer, Writer (adaptation)
- 1986: Defence of the Realm
- 1991: The Commitments
- 1993: The Snapper
- 1996: The Van
- 1997: The Life of Stuff
- 2000: When Brendan Met Trudy
- 2002: Killing Me Softly – Co-Producer

== Awards and nominations ==
- 2 BAFTA Awards nominations for Best Single Drama and Best Film
- London Critics Circle Film Award

== Works and publications ==
- Pye, Michael; Myles, Lynda (1979). The Movie Brats: How the Film Generation Took Over Hollywood. New York: Holt, Rinehart, and Winston. ISBN 978-0-030-42671-1. OCLC 963556114.
- Oliver-Goodwin, Michael; Myles, Lynda (2012). "Part II: Vertigo's Wanderers: On Seeking the Cinematic Sacred. Chapter 5: Alfred Hitchcock's San Francisco: You Can Hang by Your Fingers with James Stewart, Dream in the Fog with Kim Novak, and Relive Their Terrifying Love Story on the Vertigo Tour". In Cunningham, Douglas A. (ed.). The San Francisco of Alfred Hitchcock's Vertigo: Place, Pilgrimage, and Commemoration. Lanham, MD: Scarecrow Press. pp. 81–96. ISBN 978-0-810-88123-5. OCLC 775873185. "Re-publication of July 1982 San Francisco magazine article"
- Myles, Lynda (24 August 2013). "Lynda Myles pays tribute to Philip French". The Guardian.

== See also ==
- Edinburgh International Film Festival
