= Smile (Doyle novel) =

2017 novel by Roddy Doyle

- First edition
- Author: Roddy Doyle
- Language: English
- Publisher: Jonathan Cape
- Publication date: September 7, 2017
- Publication place: Republic of Ireland
- Pages: 224
- ISBN: 978-1-911214-75-5
- Preceded by: The Dead Republic

Smile is a 2017 novel by Irish author Roddy Doyle.

== Reception ==
The New Statesman said: "Smile is a Trojan Horse. The tale of how a man got on with his life after an abusive childhood, in part by laughing at it, is a disguise: Doyle’s tactic is to puncture the comedy of Irish storytelling and show that it can camouflage horrific histories. Doyle is one of the best writers of dialogue we have, using it with humour and drama."
