= Killian Donnelly =

Irish tenor

- Born: 25 June 1984 (age 42); Kilmessan, County Meath, Ireland
- Occupations: Actor, singer
- Years active: 2004–present
- Known for: Les Misérables

Killian Donnelly (born 25 June 1984) is an Irish tenor singer and stage actor. He has appeared in musicals such as Les Misérables, The Phantom of the Opera, and Kinky Boots.

== Background ==
Donnelly is from Kilmessan, in County Meath, Ireland, where he was a member of the St Mary's Musical Society. He has one sister, Eimear, and one brother, Ciaran, who still live in Ireland. Donnelly is a tenor and plays piano and guitar.

Donnelly was scouted by a theatre agency while performing in a production in Ireland. He then made the move to London to pursue a career in musical theatre, securing a role in the West End production of Les Misérables.

== Career ==
Donnelly has appeared in many different roles around Ireland and has also directed and written shows. His first theatre role was in 2005 where he featured in the chorus of The Wireman at the Gaiety Theatre, Dublin. He then continued to play Rod in Singin' in the Rain and Ethan in The Full Monty, both at the Olympia Theatre, Tony in West Side Story at the Solstice Theatre, Aladdin in Aladdin and Collins in Michael Collins: A Musical Drama, both at the Cork Opera House, Prince Charming in Cinderella at the Gaiety Theatre, Dublin and Chorus in Sweeney Todd: The Demon Barber of Fleet Street at the Gate Theatre.

In 2008, he joined the West End production of Les Misérables as a swing and, as a member of the cast, was part of the Les Misérables concert with the Bournemouth Symphony Orchestra on the Isle of Wight. He became second cover Javert and Enjolras in the following season of 2009/10, during which time he also performed the lead role of Jean Valjean as an emergency cover multiple times. With the following cast change he was promoted to principal Enjolras and was officially listed (and performed) as third cover Valjean. He eventually finished in Les Misérables on 18 June 2011.

Donnelly's next role was Raoul in Andrew Lloyd Webber's The Phantom of the Opera at Her Majesty's Theatre. During this time, he also featured in commercials for McDonald's and Jameson Whiskey, and appeared on such television shows as The Tudors, The Open House, The Late Late Show and Showbands. He later performed in You Should Be Dancing at the National Concert Hall.

On 3 October 2010, Donnelly played the role of Courfeyrac in the 25th Anniversary Concert of Les Misérables at The O2 Arena in London. He also played the role of Combeferre in the film of the show, released in 2012. On 12 November 2012, Donnelly took over the role of Tony in Billy Elliot The Musical at the Victoria Palace Theatre.

On 20 August 2013, it was confirmed that Donnelly would originate the role of Deco in the West End Musical The Commitments from 21 September. The following year Donnelly began playing the role of Huey in Memphis from 9 October 2014 for which he was nominated as Best Actor in a Musical in the 2015 Olivier Awards

On 23 April 2015, it was announced that Donnelly would play Charlie in the West End production of the musical Kinky Boots, at the Adelphi Theatre. The first preview was on 21 August 2015. On 29 February 2016 Donnelly was nominated as Best Actor in a Musical at the 2016 Olivier Awards. He left the show on 13 August 2016 and moved back to Ireland to play Jackie Day in Donegal, a new play by Frank McGuinness. On 6 December 2016, he made his Broadway debut, reprising the role of Charlie Price in Kinky Boots.

On 12 June 2017, Donnelly returned to the West End production of Les Misérables to play the lead role, Jean Valjean, subsequently reprising the role in the 2018 tour in the United Kingdom and Ireland.

On 29 February 2020, he returned to The Phantom of the Opera, this time playing The Phantom on the 2020 UK Tour. Due to the 2020 COVID-19 pandemic, the tour was closed just a few weeks into its run at Curve, Leicester, ending Donnelly's run as the Phantom on tour.

On 4 December 2020, it was announced that Donnelly would reprise the role of The Phantom in the West End production of The Phantom of the Opera when it was scheduled to reopen in June 2021. After two and a half years in the role, Donnelly performed his last show as The Phantom on 3 February 2023.

On 31 October 2023, Donnelly re-joined Les Misérables in the new West End production at the Sondheim Theatre reprising his role of Valjean for 15 weeks. In 2024, he reprised the role again in Les Misérables: The Arena Spectacular World Tour. He shared the role with Alfie Boe and Peter Joback. Donnelly performed the role in the UK, Australia, Italy, Japan, the United Arab Emirates, Denmark, Norway, Switzerland, Luxembourg, the Royal Albert Hall, and Radio City Music Hall in New York City.

Donnelly performed in the 10th-anniversary concert of the Made in Dagenham musical at the London Palladium in March 2024, playing the lead role, Eddie.

In late 2024, it was announced that Donnelly would reprise his role as Jean Valjean in the Les Miserables Arena Tour, which would travel around the world. He was announced alongside long standing Javert, Bradley Jaden. Throughout this run, he returned to play Valjean at the Sondheim Theatre for a limited run in the West End, before touring the UK & Ireland, followed by a Summer run at Radio City Music Hall, New York City in 2026. This 2 and a half year stint culminated with Donnelly appearing as Jean Valjean in the 2026 Les Misérables: The 40th Anniversary All-Star Cast Recording

== Filmography & Television ==
Year	Title	Role	Notes
2010	Les Misérables in Concert: The 25th Anniversary	Courfeyrac / Queen's Theatre Company	
2011	The Phantom of the Opera at the Royal Albert Hall	Ensemble / Fireman #5	
2012	Les Misérables	Combeferre	
2019	Kinky Boots: The Musical	Charlie Price	
2019	The Late Late Show	Himself	Singing Phantom of The Opera
2020	Britain's Got Talent	The Phantom	Part of The Shows Must Go On

== Theatre Credits ==
Year	Title	Role	Theatre	Location
2005	The Wireman	Ensemble	Gaiety Theatre, Dublin	Dublin
2005	Singin' in the Rain	Rod	Olympia Theatre	Dublin
2006	The Full Monty	Ethan	Olympia Theatre	Dublin
2006	West Side Story	Tony	Solstice Theatre	Dublin
2006	Aladdin	Aladdin	Cork Opera House	Cork
2007	Sweeney Todd: The Demon Barber of Fleet Street	Anthony Hope	Gaiety Theatre, Dublin	Dublin
2007	Cinderella	Prince Charming	Gaiety Theatre, Dublin	Dublin
2008-2010	Les Misérables	Ensemble u/s Javert u/s Enjolras; Emergency u/s Jean Valjean	Queen's Theatre	West End
2008	Les Misérables	Feuilly / National Guardsmen	The Winter Gardens	Isle of Wight
2010-2011	Les Misérables	Enjolras u/s Jean Valjean	Queen's Theatre	West End
2010	Les Misérables	Courfeyrac	O2 Arena	London
2011	The Phantom of the Opera	Ensemble / Fireman #5	Royal Albert Hall	London
2011-2012	The Phantom of the Opera	Raoul, Vicomte de Chagny	Her Majesty's Theatre	West End
2011	You Should Be Dancing	Ensemble	National Concert Hall	London
2012-2013	Billy Elliot The Musical	Tony	Victoria Palace Theatre	West End
2013-2014	The Commitments	Deco	Palace Theatre	West End
2014-2015	Memphis	Huey	Shaftesbury Theatre	West End
2015-2016	Kinky Boots	Charlie Price	Adelphi Theatre	West End
2016	Donegal	Jackie Day	Abbey Theatre	Dublin
2016-2017	Kinky Boots	Charlie Price	Al Hirschfeld Theatre	Broadway
2017-2018	Les Misérables	Jean Valjean	Queen's Theatre	West End
2018-2019	Les Misérables	Jean Valjean	—N/a	UK National Tour
2020	The Phantom of the Opera	The Phantom of the Opera	—N/a	UK National Tour
2021-2023	The Phantom of the Opera	The Phantom of the Opera	Her Majesty's Theatre	West End
2023	Fun Home	Bruce Bechdel	Gate Theatre	Dublin
2023-2024	Les Misérables	Jean Valjean	Sondheim Theatre	West End
2024	Made in Dagenham	Eddie	London Palladium	West End
2024-2025	Les Misérables	Jean Valjean	-	World Arena Concert Tour
2025	Les Misérables	Jean Valjean	Sondheim Theatre	West End
2026	Les Misérables	Jean Valjean	-	World Arena Concert Tour
