= Stanley Townsend =

Irish actor

- Born: Dublin, County Dublin, Ireland
- Education: Wesley College, Dublin
- Alma mater: Trinity College Dublin
- Occupation: Actor
- Spouse: Orla Charlton
- Awards: Irish Times Best Actor Award; 2004 Shining City

Stanley Townsend is an Irish actor.

== Early life and education ==
Stanley Townsend was born and brought up in Dublin.

After attending Wesley College, Dublin, he studied mathematics and civil engineering at Trinity College. While there he joined the Dublin University Players, the college's Amateur Dramatic Society.

== Career ==
=== Screen ===
Townsend's television work began on a number of shows for RTÉ in Dublin. After moving to London, television appearances have included Spooks, The Commander, Hustle, Waking the Dead, and Omagh Bombing.

Film credits include Mike Newell's Into the West, Jim Sheridan's In the Name of the Father with Daniel Day-Lewis, The Van by Stephen Frears, Peter Greenaway's The Tulse Luper Suitcases, The Libertine with Johnny Depp, Paul Morrison's Wondrous Oblivion with Delroy Lindo, John Boorman's The Tiger's Tail and Michael Radford's Flawless.

=== Stage ===
Townsend co-founded co-operative theatre company Rough Magic with writer/director Declan Hughes and theatre director Lynne Parker, performing in numerous productions including The Country Wife, Nightshade, and Sexual Perversity in Chicago. He subsequently went on to perform in several productions at The Gate and Abbey Theatres in Dublin. In London, he has worked with such directors as Sam Mendes in The Plough and the Stars at the Young Vic, London, Richard Eyre in Guys and Dolls, and Rufus Norris in Under the Blue Sky. Theatre appearances at the Royal Court include The Alice Trilogy directed by Ian Rickson and Shining City directed by Conor McPherson, for which he won an Irish Theatre Award and was nominated for the Evening Standard Theatre Award for Best Actor in 2004.

Townsend's other theatre work includes: Remember This, Phèdre and Happy Now? at the National Theatre, London; The Weir and Tribes at the Royal Court, London; The Wake, Trinity for Two and Sacred Mysteries at the Abbey Theatre, Dublin; The Gingerbread Mix-up at St Andrews Lane, Dublin; Prayers of Sherkin at the Old Vic, London; Someone Who'll Watch Over Me at West Yorkshire Playhouse, Leeds; Democracy at the Bush Theatre, London; Speed-the-Plow for Project Arts Centre, Dublin; Saint Oscar for Field Day Theatre Company, Derry; Sexual Perversity in Chicago, The Caucasian Chalk Circle, The White Devil for Rough Magic, Dublin; Who Shall Be Happy...? for Mad Cow Productions, Belfast, London, and tour; and Art in the West End. He played Eddie Carbone in A View from the Bridge at the Lyceum Theatre, Edinburgh in early 2011.

His portrayal of Sims in The Nether for director Jeremy Herrin at the Royal Court Theatre in July 2014 won critical acclaim.

== Filmography ==
Key
†	Denotes works that have not yet been released

=== Television ===
Year	Title	Role	Notes	Ref.
1987	Lapsed Catholic	Mickey Geraghty	TV film	
1987	Fortycoats & Co.	Ranny Gazoo		
1991	Parnell and the Englishwoman	Thomas Sexton	Miniseries, 4 episodes	
1992	The Bill	Jim Kerr	Episode: "Counting the Cost"	
1993	Screen Two	Anaesthetist	Episode: "The Snapper"	
1994	Downwardly Mobile	Seamus	Episode: "Grapefruit and Roses"	
1995	The Governor	Pete (Carpenter)	Episode: "Episode 6"	
1995	Jake's Progress	Consultant	Miniseries	
1995	Beyond Reason	John Horan	TV film	
1998	Jonathan Creek	Detective Inspector Barrison	2 episodes	
1998	Peak Practice	Keith Johnson	Episode: "Body and Soul"	
1998	Ballykissangel	Micky Keeler	3 episodes	
1999	The Ambassador	DS Slater	Episode: "Getting Away with Murder"	
1999	DDU: District Detective Unit	Ciaran Gregory	Episode: "The Gates of Eden"	
2000	In Defence	Dr. Jack Gower	Episode: "Episode 4"	
2001	Best of Both Worlds	Paddy	3 episodes	
2001	Table 12	Guido	Episode: "Opera Lovers"	
2001	Station Jim	Matapan	TV film	
2001	Casualty	Joe	Episode: "Dirty Laundry"	
2001	Heartbeat	Igor Saukas	Episode: "Russian Roulette"	
2001	The Seventh Stream	Constable	TV film	
2002	Menace	Fellner	Miniseries, 2 episodes	
2003	The Commander	David Sperry		
2003	Byron	Turkish Governor	TV film	
2003	Wire in the Blood	Geoffrey Markham	2 episodes	
2004	Murder City	Edward De Vere	Episode: "Nothing Sacred"	
2004	Fallen	Mara		
2004	The Brief	Costas Nicolaou	Episode: "So Long, Samantha"	
2004	Omagh	Sam Pollock	TV film	
2005	Hustle	Johnny Keyes	Episode: "Confessions"	
2005	Proof	Patrick Mooney	4 episodes	
2005	Spooks	Roy Woodring	Episode: "The Book"	
2005	The Virgin Queen	King Philip of Spain	1 episode	
2007	Waking the Dead	DI Bailey	2 episodes	
2007	Foyle's War	Jose De Perez	Episode: "Casualties of War"	
2007	Rough Diamond	Charlie Carrick	6 episodes	
2007	Saddam's Tribe: Bound by Blood	Saddam Hussein	TV film	
2007	Prosperity	Eamonn	Episode: "Pala's Story"	
2008	He Kills Coppers	Mick	TV film	
2008	Whistleblower	Michael Neary	2 episodes	
2008	The Clinic	Michael Kinsella	2 episodes	
2009	New Tricks	Don Maddox	Episode: "Shadow Show"	
2010	Ashes to Ashes	Jason Sacks	1 episode	
2010	Sherlock	Angelo	Episode: "A Study in Pink"	
2011	Zen	Moscati	Miniseries, 3 episodes	
2011	The Shadow Line	Bulkat Babur	Miniseries, 4 episodes	
2011	Appropriate Adult	Syd Young	1 episode	
2012	Call the Midwife	Father Joe	Episode: "The Browne Incident"	
2012	Titanic: Blood and Steel	Rex Riley	Episode: "The 'Unsinkable' Sets Sail"	
2012	Coming Up	Yevgeny Sukhov	Episode: "If We Dead Awaken"	
2012	Fresh Meat	John Frobisher	1 episode	
2013	Mad Dogs	Lazaro	1 episode	
2013	Burton and Taylor	Milton Katselas	TV film	
2013	Toast of London	Mr. Fasili	Episode: "Vanity Project"	
2013	Ripper Street	Aiden Galven	Episode: "Dynamite and a Woman"	
2014	Fleming : The Man Who Would Be Bond	Colonel William Donovan	2 episodes	
2014	Quirke	Inspector Hackett	Miniseries, 3 episodes	
2014	New Worlds	Colonel Blood	Miniseries, 1 episode	
2014	24: Live Another Day	Anatol Stolnavich	5 episodes	
2015-2016	Galavant	King of Valencia	13 episodes	
2016	The Hollow Crown	Warwick	2 episodes	
2016	The Tunnel	Mike Bowden	7 episodes	
2016	The Collection	Stanley Rossi	3 episodes	
2017	Redwater	Peter Dolan	5 episodes	
2018	Informer	Geoffrey Boyce	5 episodes	
2018	Finding Joy	Joy's Dad	3 episodes	
2019	Rebellion	Senator Daniel Shea	Miniseries, 2 episodes	
2019	Resistance	Senator Daniel Shea	Miniseries, 4 episodes	
2019	Traitors	Henry	Miniseries, 5 episodes	
2019	The Spy	General Ad-Din	Miniseries, 6 episodes	
2019	Agatha and the Curse of Ishtar	Sir Constance	TV film	
2021	Death in Paradise	Bruce Garrett	Episode: "Christmas in Paradise"	
2022	Becoming Elizabeth	Anthony Denny	2 episodes	
2022	Andor	Commandant Jayhold Beehaz	Episode: "The Eye"	
2022	Dangerous Liaisons	Eduard Abbaye	3 episodes	
2024	The Regime	Emil Bartos	Miniseries, 4 episodes	
2024	Blackshore	Bill McGuire	6 episodes	
2024	Kaos	Minos	6 episodes	

=== Film ===
Year	Title	Role	Reference
1988	Taffin	Les	
1991	The Miracle	Washington	
1992	Blue Ice	Interrogator #1	
1992	Into the West	Rico	
1993	In the Name of the Father	Hooker's Driver	
1995	Undercurrent	Bob Harris	
1996	The Van	Health Inspector	
1996	My Friend Joe	Mr. Doyle	
1996	Moll Flanders	Gambler	
2000	Rat	Newsreader	
2002	American Girl		
2003	Wondrous Oblivion	Victor Wiseman	
2003	Monsieur N	Barry O'Meara	
2003	Mystics	Mickey Mac	
2003	What a Girl Wants	Bride's Father	
2004	The Libertine	Keown	
2004	Inside I'm Dancing	Interview Panelist	
2004	Tulse Luper II		
2004	Suzie Gold	Irving Gold	
2005	Isolation	Garda Hourican	
2005	Dot.Kill	Captain Tommy Byrnes	
2006	Nativity	Zechariah	
2006	The Tiger's Tail	Jim Brady	
2007	Flawless	Henry	
2008	Happy-Go-Lucky	Tramp	
2009	Hilde	David O. Selznick	
2009	Holy Water	Inspector Brian Hogan	
2009	Happy Ever Afters	Mr. Maguire	
2010	1st Night	Paolo Prodi	
2011	Killing Bono	Danny	
2011	Cars 2	Vladimir Trunkov, Ivan, Victor Hugo	Voice
2013	Lovely Louise	Bill	
2013	One Chance	Luciano Pavarotti	
2013	The Physician	Bar Kappara	
2014	The Voices	Sheriff Weinbacher	
2015	Underdogs	The Agent	Voice
2016	Florence Foster Jenkins	Phineas Stark	
2017	The Current War	Franklin Pope	
2019	A Girl from Mogadishu	Joe Costello	
2019	The Song of Names	Gilbert Simmonds	
2022	About Joan	Doug	
2023	Kinked	Bulent	
2023	The Teacher	Simon Cohen	
2025	Jay Kelly	First Voice	
2026	Once Upon a Time in a Cinema	Harry Conway	
2026	The Uprising †		Post-production

=== Video games ===
Year	Title	Role
1997	Independence War	
2001	RuneScape	Saradomin
2001	Independence War 2: Edge of Chaos	Smith
2002	Drakan: The Ancients' Gates	Various voices
2004	Powerdrome	Amran Dachs / Angul
2005	Spartan: Total Warrior	Ares
2005	Harry Potter and the Goblet of Fire	Mad-Eye Moody
2007	The Witcher	Azar Javed
2008	WorldShift	Jack the Crank
2011	Cars 2: The Video Game	Victor Hugo
2014	Transformers Universe	Rampart
2014	Sacred 3	Zane
2017	Mass Effect: Andromeda	Nakmor Drack
2017	Xenoblade Chronicles 2	Battle Narrator
2018	Xenoblade Chronicles 2: Torna – The Golden Country	Battle Narrator
2018	World of Warcraft: Battle for Azeroth	
2022	Xenoblade Chronicles 3	Consul Triton
