= Open Door Series =

The Open Door series, an adult literacy series of novellas by well-known Irish authors, was launched in the mid-1990s by Irish publisher New Island and author Patricia Scanlan. Scanlan had worked in public libraries in Dublin before becoming a full-time writer and was acutely aware of the literacy problems facing a large segment of the adult population and the dearth of appropriate reading material available to them.

The Open Door texts are subject to specific editorial guidelines, which help participating authors create novels for the purpose intended. These include: a discernible plot; a few, well-developed characters; simple language with the occasional challenging word; and short chapters, to create the feel and structure of "regular" novels. All the texts are 10,000 words or less and sentences are kept short.

These characteristics of the texts have also endeared them to students learning English as a foreign language, and they are gradually being marketed as such, with co-editions containing glossaries being produced by German ELT publisher Cornelsen as of 2006. Audio editions have also been published, by WH Howes. In summer 2007, Irish language editions of some of the most popular Open Door titles were published with the language school market in mind.

== Books in the series ==
As of 2006, five series of the Open Doors were in print, with a new series of the English language editions planned for the autumn of 2007. One poetry anthology, edited by Niall McMonagle, was also published under the series banner. All royalties from domestic sales of English language titles are donated to a charity of the author's choice.

=== Books published in the first series ===
Sad Song - Vincent Banville
In High Germany - Dermot Bolger
Not Just For Christmas - Roddy Doyle
Maggie's Story - Sheila O'Flannagan
Billy and Jesus are Off to Barcelona - Deirdre Purcell
Ripples - Patricia Scanlan

=== Books published in the second series ===
No Dress Rehearsal - Marian Keyes
Joe’s Wedding - Gareth O’Callaghan
The Comedian - Joseph O’Connor
Second Chance - Patricia Scanlan
Pipe Dreams - Anne Schulmanl
Old Money, New Money - Peter Sheridan

=== Books published in the third series ===
An Accident Waiting to Happen - Vincent Banville
The Builders - Maeve Binchy
Letter from Chicago - Cathy Kelly
Driving with Daisy - Tom Nestor
It All Adds Up - Margaret Neylon
Has Anyone Here Seen Larry? - Deirdre Purcell

=== Books published in the fourth series ===
Fair-Weather Friend - Patricia Scanlan
The Story of Joe Brown - Rose Doyle
The Smoking Room - Julie Parsons
World Cup Diary - Niall Quinn
The Quiz Master - Michael Scott
Stray Dog - Gareth O'Callaghan

=== Books published in the fifth series ===
Mrs. Whippy - Cecelia Ahern
'Mad Weekend - Roddy Doyle
Behind Closed Doors - Sarah Webb
Secrets - Patricia Scanlan
Not a Star - Nick Hornby
The Underbury Witches - John Connolly
