= Patricia Scanlan =

Irish writer

- Born: 1956 (age 69–70); Dublin, Ireland
- Occupation: Writer
- Writing career
- Pen name: Patricia Scanlan

Patricia Scanlan (born 1956) is an Irish novelist of over 20 books.

== Biography ==
Scanlan was born in Dublin where she still lives. She was a Dublin City librarian for 17 years. While she was working, Scanlan was also writing her first novel because she was short of money. That book was published in 1992. Since then, she has published 19 novels, short stories, poems and edited anthologies. She is based in Clontarf.

Scanlan is the creator of the Open Door Series for adult literacy and teaches creative writing to secondary school age girls.

== Bibliography ==
- City Girl (1992)
- City Lives (1999)
- City Woman (1993)
- Second Chance (2000)
- Secrets (2006)
- Forgive and Forget (2008)
- Happy Ever After (2009)
- Love and Marriage (2011)
- Apartment 3B (1991)
- Finishing Touches (1992)
- Foreign Affairs (1994)
- Promises, Promises (1996)
- Mirror Mirror (1997)
- Two for Joy (2001)
- Francesca's Party (2001)
- Double Wedding (2004)
- Divided Loyalties (2006)
- Coming Home (2009)
- With All My Love (2013)
- Coming Home... for Christmas (2014)
- A Time For Friends (2015)
- Orange Blossom Days (2018)
- The Liberation of Brigid Dunne (2020)

=== Collections ===
- Selected Poems (poems) (1993)
- Foreign Affairs / City Woman (1997)
- Reeling in slow motion (poems) (2002)
- Winter Blessings (2005)
- A Gift For You (2015)

=== Novellas ===
- Ripples (1999)
- Fair-weather Friend (2004)
