= The Snapper (film) =

1993 film directed by Stephen Frears

- Directed by: Stephen Frears
- Screenplay by: Roddy Doyle
- Based on: The Snapper by Roddy Doyle
- Produced by: Lynda Myles
- Starring: Colm Meaney; Tina Kellegher; Ruth McCabe
- Cinematography: Oliver Stapleton
- Edited by: Mick Audsley
- Music by: Stanley Myers
- Production company: BBC Films
- Distributed by: Miramax Films
- Release date: 4 April 1993
- Running time: 91 minutes
- Country: Ireland
- Language: English

The Snapper is a 1993 Irish comedy film directed by Stephen Frears, and starring Tina Kellegher, Colm Meaney and Brendan Gleeson. The film is based on the 1990 novel by Irish writer Roddy Doyle, about the Curley family and their domestic adventures. For his performance, Meaney was nominated for the Golden Globe Award for Best Actor – Motion Picture Musical or Comedy.

== Plot ==
Soon after a wild night at the pub, twenty-year-old Sharon Curley finds herself expecting a little "snapper" (baby) by a man she loathes. Her refusal to name the father sets in motion a family drama involving her three brothers, two sisters, and her parents, along with her employers and all her friends. Kellegher, playing the role as a coarse, earthy, yet remarkably sensible young woman soon discovers who her friends really are, as some people tease and torment her, some make remarks to her siblings, some force her father to take direct action in her defence, and all spread gossip. She decides to keep the baby and her family, each in their own way, eventually decides to support her. Her father particularly studies up on childbirth and female anatomy (with gratifying results for his wife as a bonus).

Des Curley, Sharon's father, shows the whole world in his face, his emotions ranging from outrage toward Sharon for embarrassing the family to tender concern as her time draws near. As the eight-member family trips all over each other emotionally (symbolised in their battles for the one bathroom, often occupied by Sharon), the tensions within the family grow more intense. Widespread speculation about the identity of the father disrupts the neighbourhood, with some hotheads visiting their own brand of justice on the Curleys. It is revealed that father of the baby is George Burgess, the father of Sharon's friend Yvonne, who had sex with an inebriated Sharon. As Sharon was incapable of giving consent, this meets the legal definition of rape. The arrival of the baby offers a chance at resolution.

== Cast ==
- Tina Kellegher as Sharon Curley
- Colm Meaney as Des Curley
- Ruth McCabe as Kay Curley
- Brendan Gleeson as Lester
- Pat Laffan as George Burgess
- Rynagh O'Grady as the Neighbour
- Stanley Townsend as the Anaesthetist
- Stuart Dunne as Bertie
- Barbara Bergin as Dawn
- Birdie Sweeney as the Loner
- Cathleen Delany as the Oul'One
- Cathy Belton as the Desk Nurse
- Tom Murphy as the Pal
- Stephen Kennedy as the Supermarket Trainee Manager
- Roddy Doyle as himself
- Karen Woodley as Yvonne Burgess
- Virginia Cole as Doris Burgess
- Denis Menton as Pat Burgess
- Peter Rowen as Sonny Curley
- Eanna MacLiam as Craig Curley
- Colm O'Byrne as Darren Curley
- Joanne Gerrard as Lisa Curley
- Ciara Duffy as Kimberley Curley
- Deirdre O'Brien as Mary Curley
- Aisling Conlan and Alannagh McMullen as Baby Curley
- Sheila Flitton as Missis Twix
- Jack Lynch as Cancer
- Ronan Wilmot as Paddy
- Fionnuala Murphy as Jackie O'Keefe

== Production ==
The surname of the Rabbitte family in the book had to be changed to Curley as 20th Century Fox owns the rights to the Rabbitte name from The Commitments (1991), which featured the same characters. The film was shot in many familiar locations around Dublin including Raheny, Kilbarrack, Ballybough, Dún Laoghaire & The Old Shieling Hotel.

== Theatrical release ==
The film opened theatrically in the United Kingdom and Ireland on 6 August 1993 on 28 screens. It was released by Electric Pictures in the UK and Ireland and Buena Vista in the US & Canada.

== Reception ==
The film grossed £74,754 in its opening weekend in the United Kingdom and Ireland (including £34,043 from 10 screens in Ireland) and went on to gross £474,206 in the UK. In the United States and Canada, the film grossed $3.3 million.

On the review aggregator website Rotten Tomatoes, 97% of 31 critics' reviews are positive. The website's consensus reads: "Warm, funny, and populated by easily relatable characters, The Snapper is a compulsively watchable slice-of-life dramedy with much to recommend."

=== Year-end lists ===
- 4th – Douglas Armstrong, The Milwaukee Journal
- Top 7 (not ranked) – Duane Dudek, Milwaukee Sentinel
- Top 10 (not ranked) – Dennis King, Tulsa World
