= The Commitments (novel) =

1987 novel

- First Edition
- Author: Roddy Doyle
- Illustrator: Derek Spiers
- Cover artist: Charlie O’Neill
- Language: English
- Series: The Barrytown Trilogy
- Genre: Comedy
- Publisher: King Farouk (Dublin)
- Publication date: 1987
- Publication place: Ireland
- Media type: Print (hardback & paperback)
- Pages: 144
- ISBN: 0-9512072-0-2
- Followed by: The Snapper

The Commitments (1987) (originally to be called The Partitions) is a novel by Irish writer Roddy Doyle. The first episode in The Barrytown Trilogy, it is about a group of unemployed young people in the north side of Dublin, Ireland, who start a soul band.

== Background ==
Doyle wrote the novel while working as a teacher in Kilbarrack, Dublin. Although it is his publishing debut it was not the first novel he wrote, and he had written for the stage, his play Brownbread being produced by Passion Machine, a theatre company with a special interest in working-class Dublin stories, in 1987. It was directed by Paul Mercier.

Encouraged by positive feedback for the script of Brownbread in Dublin and following numerous rejections he self-published The Commitments, creating the King Farouk press (King Farouk is Dublin rhyming slang for a book, book being pronounced "buke" in Dublin) with Passion Machine producer John Sutton. Following a successful local run of 2,000 books which sold out in six months, the novel was picked up by William Heinemann to be published in the UK. An endorsement from Elvis Costello brought the book to wider attention.

== Plot summary ==
Two friends — Derek Scully and "Outspan" Foster — get together to form a band, but soon realise that they don't know enough about the music business to get much further than their small neighbourhood in the Northside of Dublin. To solve this problem, they recruit a friend they'd had from school, Jimmy Rabbitte, to be their manager. He accepts graciously, but only if he can make fundamental changes to the group, the first being the sacking of the third, and mutually disliked, member — their synth player. After this, Rabbitte gets rid of their name, making them "The Commitments" (stating "All the good 60s bands started with a 'the'") and, most importantly, forming them from another synthpop group into the face of what he thinks will be the Dublin-Soul revolution ("Yes, Lads. You'll be playing Dublin Soul!").

He witnesses a young man singing drunkenly into a microphone at a friend's wedding and is struck by the fact he is singing "something approximating music". Jimmy places an ad in the local paper reading "Have you got soul? Then Dublin's hardest working band is looking for you". Eventually, he gets together a mismatched group with seemingly no musical talent, led by mysterious stranger Joey "The Lips" Fagan, who claims to have played trumpet with Joe Tex and the Four Tops. They quickly start learning how to play their instruments and perform a number of local gigs.

With music fanatic Jimmy Rabbite as their manager, the Commitments seek to fulfil their goal of bringing soul to Dublin. In the beginning, Jimmy includes all of the country Ireland, but later realises that the culchies have everything whereas the Dubliners are the working-class and have nothing. Bringing soul music to Ireland is then reduced merely to the city.

Tensions run high between the band members, not helped by the jealousy and animosity Joey receives from other male members due to the attention he receives from the female backing singers. The band slowly becomes more and more musically competent and draws bigger and more enthusiastic audiences. But the band falls apart after a gig when Joey is seen kissing Imelda and a fight ensues — all while Jimmy is negotiating to record the band's first single with an independent label.

Fagan soon goes to America after Imelda tells him she is pregnant (it turns out she was actually lying, only saying this for the attention). In the end, Jimmy, along with the band's other founding members and Mickah, form The Brassers, an Irish hybrid of punk and country. They plan on inviting James into the band after he's finished his medical degree, and they discuss getting the ladies involved as well.

== Themes ==
With The Commitments, Doyle intentionally focused on a contemporary Dublin setting as he felt this part of Irish life was not given due attention, especially compared to stories with a rural setting or those involving The Troubles in Northern Ireland. Doyle pointedly makes a comparison between the experience of being a Northside Dubliner and the experience of being African American. The line "the Irish are the blacks of Europe" is one of the most famous in the book, and has been described as "the equivalent for the Celtic Tiger of de Valera's homage to comely maidens speech in the 1940s". Doyle's attempt to make a link between black and Irish experiences would be a popular trope in Irish literature in this period in works such as Brian Friel's Dancing at Lughnasa and Seamus Heaney's The Cure at Troy. While the Dunnes Stores strike (where Dublin workers refused to handle fruit from South Africa in protest at apartheid) is not mentioned directly, it is alluded to as Outspan's nickname (a common nickname at the time for redheads) was a reference to the South African orange brand Outspan.

Poverty and the lack of opportunities for working-class Dubliners are addressed in the book, often indirectly. It is alluded to on a number of occasions that most of the band left school after the Inter Cert (at 16) rather than taking the Leaving Cert which would have been necessary to apply for university.

== Personnel ==
- Declan "Deco" Cuffe – lead vocals
- Natalie Murphy – vocals
- Imelda Quirke – vocals
- Bernadette "Bernie" McGloughin – vocals
- Liam "Outspan" Foster – guitars
- Derek Scully – bass
- Joey "The Lips" Fagan – trumpet
- Dean Fay – alto saxophone
- Steven James Clifford – keyboards, piano
- Billy Mooney – drums (first drummer, who quit because he couldn't stand Deco)
- Mickah Wallace – drums (second drummer)

== Reception ==
Kirkus Reviews wrote: "Brash, human, smoothly executed, and seemingly authentic, full of youth, energy, and good humor, this is a quintessential garage-band romance—and a fine and promising debut".

The film, book, and soundtrack were all hugely popular in the 90s, and a group containing some of the film's actors still tours. There are some differences between the book and film, the most obvious being that the novel was composed mostly of dialogue, with hardly any physical description; the movie concentrated much more on the collapse of Dublin's inner city. Unlike the film, which could be categorized as comedy drama, the book was almost entirely comedic.

== Adaptations ==
=== Film ===
The Commitments is a 1991 comedy-drama film directed by Alan Parker with a screenplay adapted by Dick Clement, Ian La Frenais, and Doyle himself. The Commitments was an international co-production between companies in Ireland, the United Kingdom, and the United States. It was filmed on location in Dublin.

=== Stage production ===
A musical stage production of the novel, also titled The Commitments, played in London's West End at the Palace Theatre from 2013 to 2015.

Following the 1991 film adaptation, Doyle said he received 20 different offers to turn the novel into a musical. He turned them all down because he had become resentful of the success of The Commitments, to the seeming exclusion of his other novels; and because he was not a fan of musical theatre, having never seen a musical. He eventually changed his mind because of his children, who were fans of the 1991 film, and who took him to see musicals, including a production of the film-turned-musical The Producers, which he called "a revelation".

Despite initially looking to hire another writer to write the book for the musical, Doyle ended up writing the show himself. The show was directed by Jamie Lloyd, with choreography by Ann Yee, set design by Soutra Gilmour, sound design by Rory Madden and lighting by Jon Clark.

== Background ==
Roddy Doyle's depiction of a working-class Dublin soul band in The Commitments has been linked to several real-life groups active in the city during the 1980s. Among them were the D11 Runners, a soul and funk band co-founded by George Fitzgerald and his twin brother Joseph. The group, who performed nationally with singles such as "I Surrender" and "Yeah! Yeah!", has been cited in Irish media as one of the inspirations for Doyle's fictional band.
