= The Van (novel) =

Book by Roddy Doyle

- First edition
- Author: Roddy Doyle
- Language: English
- Series: The Barrytown Trilogy
- Genre: Fiction, Drama
- Publisher: Secker & Warburg
- Publication date: 1991
- Publication place: Ireland
- Media type: Print (hardback & paperback)
- Pages: 312
- ISBN: 0-436-20052-X
- Preceded by: The Snapper

The Van is a 1991 novel by Roddy Doyle and the third novel in The Barrytown Trilogy. It was shortlisted for the Booker Prize (1991).

== Premise ==
The basis of the story is that Jimmy Rabbitte Sr. has been laid off from his job and has no money. His friend, Brendan "Bimbo" Reeves, also is laid off and receives a redundancy cheque. With this cheque, the two friends decide to purchase a 'chipper' (fish and chips van). Jimmy and Bimbo's friendship becomes strained, because Jimmy starts to believe that Bimbo and his wife Maggie are planning the work behind his back.

The story continues themes found in the other two novels of The Barrytown Trilogy and focuses on the elder Jimmy Rabbitte and his efforts at going into business with friends.

== Film adaptation ==
Stephen Frears turned it into a film in 1996 starring Colm Meaney as Larry (renamed from Jimmy Rabbitte) and Donal O'Kelly as Brendan 'Bimbo' Reeves who he goes into business with.
