= Stuart Dunne =

Irish actor and artist

- Born: 1957 (age 68–69); Dublin, Ireland
- Occupations: Actor; artist

Stuart Dunne (born 1957) is an Irish actor and artist. He is best known for his dark and violent portrayal of the character Billy Meehan on the Irish soap opera Fair City. He was nominated at the 2003 Irish Film and Television Awards for Best Actor in a Television Drama for Fair City.

== Career ==
Dunne was born in 1957 in Dublin, Ireland. He comes from a large family, nine sisters and two brothers, from Drimnagh. He studied for five years in the Focus Theater under the direction of Deirdre O'Connell. Dunne got married in 1988 to his wife Geraldine, who is also his agent, and in 1991 their son Neil was born.

Dunne is a self-taught artist who has had his work shown on The Late Late Show on RTÉ One. He has also exhibited in the IFSC, the Davis Gallery, the James Gallery, and in England and the USA. Dunne's work hangs in The Roily Gallery, the oldest gallery in Dublin.

Dunne is currently working on the project; "Vincent: Questioning the Method", a character study where he will take on the role of Vincent Van Gogh through method acting. Set in Ireland, the film will reinterpret the last seventy days of Van Gogh's life in a modern-day retelling of this harrowing tale. The study will be documented by a film crew 24/7 for the duration, and will yield both web content and eventually a documentary feature. For more information go www.themethod.ie.

== Filmography ==
- Doctors .... Joe McNair (1 episode, 2003)
  - Getting the Ride (2003) TV episode .... Joe McNair
- Murphy's Law .... Morrison (1 episode, 2003)
  - Manic Munday (2003) TV episode .... Morrison
- In Deep .... Tom (2 episodes, 2003)
  - Queen and Country: Part 2 (2003) TV episode .... Tom
  - Queen and Country: Part 1 (2003) TV episode .... Tom
- Fair City .... Billy Meehan (1 episode, 2001)
  - Billy and Leo (2001) TV episode .... Billy Meehan
- Family Affairs (1997) TV series .... Patrick McNeil (unknown episodes, 2000)
- Knocking on Death's Door (1999) .... Judd
  ... aka Haunted House (Philippines: English title)
- Vicious Circle (1999) (TV) .... Niall
- Crush Proof (1998) .... The Da
  ... aka Dublin Desperados (Germany)
- Mia, Liebe meines Lebens (1998) TV mini-series
  ... aka Mia per sempre (Italy)
- Ballykissangel .... Soldier 1 (1 episode, 1998)
  - Pack up Your Troubles (1998) TV episode (uncredited) .... Soldier 1
- Stray Bullet (1998) .... Chester
- The MatchMaker (1997) .... Head Bang Man
- Bolt (1997) (as Stewart Dunne) .... Repairman
- The Van (1996) .... Sam
- A Man of No Importance (1994) .... John
- Ailsa (1994) .... Workman
- The Snapper (1993) (TV) .... Bertie
- "Lovejoy" .... Van Driver (1 episode, 1993)
  - Irish Stew (1993) TV episode (as Stewart Dunne) .... Van Driver
- The Flower and the Rabbit (1991)
- Joyriders (1989) .... Hank, the Barman
- Act of Betrayal (1988) (TV) .... Robert
- The Courier (1988) .... Tony

=== Appearances as himself ===
- Fair City: The Ten Commandments (2004) (TV) .... Himself
- The Late Late Show .... Himself (1 episode, 2004)
  - Episode dated 26 March 2004 (2004) TV episode .... Himself

== See also ==
- Moscow Art Theatre
- Constantin Stanislavski
- Irish Film and Television Awards/2003-1
- Method Acting
