= Roddy Doyle =

Irish author and screenwriter (born 1958)

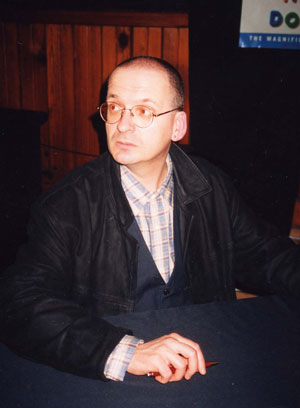
- Doyle in c. 2006
- Born: Roderick Doyle; 8 May 1958 (age 68); Dublin, Ireland
- Education: University College Dublin
- Occupations: Novelist, dramatist, short story writer, screenwriter, teacher
- Spouse: Belinda Moller (m. 1989)
- Children: 3
- Writing career
- Subject: Working-class Dublin
- Notable works: The Barrytown Trilogy, Paddy Clarke Ha Ha Ha, The Woman Who Walked into Doors, A Star Called Henry

Roderick Doyle (born 8 May 1958) is an Irish novelist, dramatist and screenwriter. He is the author of eleven novels for adults, eight books for children, seven plays and screenplays, and dozens of short stories. Several of his books have been made into films, beginning with The Commitments in 1991. Doyle's work is set primarily in Ireland, especially working-class Dublin, and is notable for its heavy use of dialogue written in slang and Irish English dialect. Doyle was awarded the Booker Prize in 1993 for his novel Paddy Clarke Ha Ha Ha.

== Personal life ==
Doyle was born in Dublin, Ireland, and grew up in Kilbarrack, in a middle-class family. His mother, Ita (née Bolger) was a first cousin of the short story writer Maeve Brennan.

In addition to teaching, Doyle, along with Seán Love, established a creative writing centre, "Fighting Words", which opened in Dublin in January 2009. It was inspired by a visit to his friend Dave Eggers' 826 Valencia project in San Francisco, California. Doyle has also engaged in local causes, including signing a petition supporting journalist Suzanne Breen, who faced gaol for refusing to divulge her sources in court, and joining a protest against an attempt by Dublin City Council to construct 9 ft-high barriers which would interfere with one of his favourite views.

In 1989, Doyle married Belinda Moller. She is the granddaughter of former Irish President Erskine Childers. The couple have three children; Rory, Jack and Kate.

Doyle is an atheist.

== Education ==
Doyle attended University College Dublin, where he studied English and geography, and graduated with a BA degree in 1979. He went on to complete a Higher Diploma in Education (HDipEd) in 1980. He spent several years as an English and geography teacher before becoming a full-time writer in 1993.

== Work ==
Doyle's writing is marked by heavy use of dialogue between characters, with little description or exposition. His work is largely set in Ireland, with a focus on the lives of working-class Dubliners. Themes range from domestic and personal concerns to larger questions of Irish history. His personal notes and workbooks reside at the National Library of Ireland.

=== Novels for adults ===
Doyle's first three novels, The Commitments (1987), The Snapper (1990) and The Van (1991) comprise The Barrytown Trilogy, a trilogy centred on the Rabbitte family. All three novels were made into successful films.

The Commitments is about a group of Dublin teenagers, led by Jimmy Rabbitte Jr., who form a soul band in the tradition of Wilson Pickett. The novel was made into a film in 1991. The Snapper, made into a film in 1993, focuses on Jimmy's sister, Sharon, who becomes pregnant. She is determined to have the child but refuses to reveal the father's identity to her family. In The Van, which was shortlisted for the 1991 Booker Prize and made into a film in 1996, Jimmy Sr. is laid off, as is his friend Bimbo; the two buy a used fish and chips van and they go into business for themselves.

In 1993, Doyle published Paddy Clarke Ha Ha Ha, which later won the 1993 Booker Prize, and which showed the world as described, understood and misunderstood by a ten-year-old Dubliner living in 1968.

Doyle's next novel dealt with darker themes. The Woman Who Walked into Doors, published in 1996, is the story of a battered wife, Paula Spencer, who was introduced in his 1994 television series Family, and is narrated by her. Despite her husband's increasingly violent behaviour, Paula defends him, using the classic excuse "I walked into a door" to explain her bruises. Ten years later, the protagonist returned in Paula Spencer, published in 2006.

Doyle's most recent trilogy of adult novels is The Last Roundup series, which follows the adventures of protagonist Henry Smart through several decades. A Star Called Henry (published 1999) is the first book in the series, and tells the story of Henry Smart, an IRA volunteer and 1916 Easter Rebellion fighter, from his birth in Dublin to his adulthood when he becomes a father. Oh, Play That Thing! (2004) continues Henry's story in 1924 America, beginning on the Lower East Side of Manhattan, where he catches the attention of local mobsters by hiring kids to carry his sandwich boards. He also goes to Chicago where he becomes a business partner with Louis Armstrong. The title is taken from a phrase that is shouted in one of Armstrong's songs, "Dippermouth Blues". In the final novel in the trilogy, The Dead Republic (published 2010), Henry collaborates on writing the script for a Hollywood film. He returns to Ireland and is offered work as the caretaker in a school when circumstances lead to him re-establishing his link with the IRA.

Doyle frequently posts short comic dialogues on his Facebook page which are implied to be between two older men in a pub, often relating to current events in Ireland (such as the 2015 marriage referendum) and further afield. These developed into the novella Two Pints (2012). Other recent works are The Guts (2013), which continues the story of the Rabbitte family from the Barrytown Trilogy, focusing on a 48-year-old Jimmy Rabbite and his diagnosis of bowel cancer and Two More Pints (2014).

=== Novels for children ===
Doyle has also written many novels for children, including the "Rover Adventures" series, which includes The Giggler Treatment (2000), Rover Saves Christmas (2001), and The Meanwhile Adventures (2004).

Other children's books include Wilderness (2007), Her Mother's Face (2008), and A Greyhound of a Girl (2011).

=== Plays, screenplays, short stories and non-fiction ===
Doyle is also a prolific dramatist, writing four plays and two screenplays. His plays with the Passion Machine Theatre Company include Brownbread (1987) and War (1989), directed by Paul Mercier with set and costume design by Anne Gately. Later plays include The Woman Who Walked into Doors (2003); and a rewrite of The Playboy of the Western World (2007) with Bisi Adigun. This latter play was the subject of litigation about copyright which ended with the Abbey Theatre agreeing to pay Adigun €600,000.

Screenplays include the television screenplay for Family (1994), which was a BBC/RTÉ serial and the forerunner of the 1996 novel The Woman Who Walked into Doors. Doyle also authored When Brendan Met Trudy (2000), which is a romance about a timid schoolteacher (Brendan) and a free-spirited thief (Trudy).

Doyle has written many short stories, several of which have been published in The New Yorker; they have also been compiled in two collections. The Deportees and Other Stories was published in 2007, while the collection Bullfighting was published in 2011. Doyle's story "New Boy" was adapted into a 2008 Academy Award-nominated short film directed by Steph Green.

Rory and Ita (2002) is a work of non-fiction about Doyle's parents, based on interviews with them.

The Commitments was adapted by Doyle for a musical which began in the West End in 2013.

Two Pints (2017) was produced by the Abbey Theatre initially in pubs and later in the theatre itself.

In 2018, the Gate Theatre commissioned Doyle to write a stage adaptation of The Snapper. The show was directed by Róisín McBrinn and was revived in 2019.

== Awards and honours ==
- 1991: Booker Prize shortlist for The Van
- 1992: BAFTA Award for Best Adapted Screenplay for The Commitments
- 1993: Booker Prize for Paddy Clarke Ha Ha Ha
- 2003: Royal Society of Literature Fellow
- 2009: Irish PEN Award
- 2011: French Literary Award ("Prix Littéraire des Jeunes Européens") for The Snapper
- 2013: Bord Gáis Energy Irish Book Awards (Novel of the Year) for The Guts
- 2015: Honorary Doctor of Laws (LLD) from University of Dundee
- 2021: Dalkey Literary Awards, Shortlist

== In popular culture ==
In the television series Father Ted, the character Father Dougal McGuire's unusual sudden use of (mild) profanities (such as saying "I wouldn't know, Ted, you big bollocks!") is blamed on his having "been reading those Roddy Doyle books again".

== Bibliography ==
=== Novels ===
- Smile (2017)
- Charlie Savage (2019)
- Love (2020)

The Barrytown Pentalogy

- The Commitments (1987, 1991 film)
- The Snapper (1990, 1993 film)
- The Van (1991); 1996 film)
- Paddy Clarke Ha Ha Ha (1993)
- The Guts (2013)

Paula Spencer novels

- The Woman Who Walked into Doors (1996)
- Paula Spencer (2006)
- The Women Behind The Door (2024)

The Last Roundup

- A Star Called Henry (1999)
- Oh, Play That Thing! (2004)
- The Dead Republic (2010)

Two Pints

- Two Pints (2012)
- Two More Pints (2014)
- Two for the Road (2019)

=== Short fiction ===
Collections

- The Deportees and Other Stories (September 2007)
- Bullfighting (April 2011)
- Life Without Children: Stories (October 2021)

Stories

Title	Year	First published	Reprinted/collected	Notes
"Not Just For Christmas"	1999	Not Just For Christmas (1999)		Part of the Open Door Series of novellas for adult literacy
"The Slave"	2000	Speaking with the Angel (2000)	Bullfighting (2011)	
"Recuperation"	2003	Doyle, Roddy (15 December 2003). "Recuperation". The New Yorker.	Bullfighting (2011)	
"The Joke"	2004		Bullfighting (2011)	
"The Child"	2004	McSweeney's Enchanted Chamber of Astonishing Stories (2004)		
"Mad Weekend"	2006	Mad Weekend (2006)		Part of the Open Door Series of novellas for adult literacy
"The Photograph"	2006		Bullfighting (2011)	
"Teaching"	2006		Bullfighting (2011)	
"The Dog"	2007		Bullfighting (2011)	
"Vincent"	2007	"Vincent". Click. New York: Arthur A. Levine Books. 2007.		
"Guess Who's Coming To Dinner"	2007		The Deportees and Other Stories (2007)	Retelling of the 1967 American film, Guess Who's Coming to Dinner
"The Deportees"	2007		The Deportees and Other Stories (2007)	
"New Boy"	2007		The Deportees and Other Stories (2007)	Adapted into 2007 short film, New Boy
"57% Irish"	2007		The Deportees and Other Stories (2007)	
"Black Hoodie"	2007		The Deportees and Other Stories (2007)	
"The Pram"	2007		The Deportees and Other Stories (2007)	
"Home To Harlem"	2007		The Deportees and Other Stories (2007)	
"I Understand"	2007		The Deportees and Other Stories (2007)	
"Bullfighting"	2008		Bullfighting (2011)	
"The Bandstand"	2009			
"Sleep"	2009		Bullfighting (2011)	
"Blood"	2009		Bullfighting (2011)	
"Animals"	2009		Bullfighting (2011)	
"Ash"	2010	Doyle, Roddy (24 May 2010). "Ash". The New Yorker. Vol. 86, no. 14. pp. 64–67.	Bullfighting (2011)	
"Funerals"	2010		Bullfighting (2011)	
"The Plate"	2010		Bullfighting (2011)	
"Brilliant"	2011			
"How To Be A Man"	2013	The Book Of Men: Eighty Writers On How To Be A Man (2013)		
"Box Sets"	2014	Doyle, Roddy (14 April 2014). "Box sets". The New Yorker. Vol. 90, no. 8. pp. 62–66.	Life Without Children (2021)	
"Dead Man Talking"	2015	Dead Man Talking (2015)		Part of the Quick Reads Initiative
"The Curfew"	2019	Doyle, Roddy (2 December 2019). "The Curfew". The New Yorker. Vol. 95, no. 38. pp. 54–58.	Life Without Children (2021)	
"Life Without Children"	2020		Life Without Children (2021)	
"Nurse"	2020		Life Without Children (2021)	
"Gone"	2021		Life Without Children (2021)	
"Masks"	2021		Life Without Children (2021)	
"The Charger"	2021		Life Without Children (2021)	
"Worms"	2021		Life Without Children (2021)	
"The Funeral"	2021		Life Without Children (2021)	
"The Five Lamps"	2021		Life Without Children (2021)	
"The Buggy"	2024	Doyle, Roddy (16 June 2024). "The Buggy". The New Yorker.		

=== Plays ===
- Brownbread (1987)
- War (1989)
- Guess Who's Coming for the Dinner? (2001)
- The Woman Who Walked into Doors (2003)
- Rewrite of The Playboy of the Western World (2007) with Bisi Adigun
- Two Pints (2017)
- The Snapper (2018)

=== Screenplays ===
- The Commitments (1991)
- The Snapper (1993)
- Family (1994)
- The Van (1996)
- When Brendan Met Trudy (2000)
- New Boy (2008)
- Rosie (2018)

=== Children's books ===
- Wilderness (2007)
- Her Mother's Face (2008)
- A Greyhound of a Girl (2011)
- Brilliant (2014)

The "Rover Adventures" series

- The Giggler Treatment (2000)
- Rover Saves Christmas (2001)
- The Meanwhile Adventures (2004)
- Rover and the Big Fat Baby (2016)

=== Non-fiction ===
- Rory And Ita (2002) – Biography of Doyle's parents
- The Second Half (2014) – Memoirs of Roy Keane
