= Colm Tóibín bibliography =

Colm Tóibín (/ˈkʌləm toʊˈbiːn/ KUL-əm toh-BEEN, Irish: [ˈkɔl̪ˠəmˠ t̪ˠoːˈbʲiːnʲ]; born 30 May 1955) is an Irish novelist, short story writer, essayist, journalist, critic, playwright and poet. He has won the Los Angeles Times Book Prize for Fiction, the International Dublin Literary Award, the Hawthornden Prize, the David Cohen Prize and the Folio Prize, amongst other awards.

== Books ==
=== Novels ===
- The South, Serpent's Tail, 1990, ISBN 978-0-330-32333-8
- The Heather Blazing, Picador, 1992, ISBN 978-0-330-32125-9
- The Story of the Night, Picador, 1996, ISBN 978-0-330-34017-5
- The Blackwater Lightship, McClelland and Stewart, 1999, ISBN 978-0-7710-8561-1
- The Master, Picador, 2004, ISBN 978-0-330-48565-4. Fictional biography of Henry James
- A Long Winter (2006)
- Brooklyn, Dublin: Tuskar Rock Press, 2009, ISBN 978-3-446-23566-3
- The Testament of Mary, Viking, 2012, ISBN 978-1451688382
- Nora Webster, Scribner, 2014, ISBN 978-1439138335
- House of Names, Scribner, 2017, ISBN 978-1501140211
- The Magician, Scribner, 2021, ISBN 978-0241004616. Fictional biography of Thomas Mann
- Long Island, Picador, 2024, ISBN 978-1-03-502944-0; Scribner, 2024, ISBN 978-1-4767-8511-0

=== Short story collections ===
- Mothers and Sons, Picador, 2006, ISBN 978-0-330-44182-7
- The Empty Family, Penguin/Viking, 2010, ISBN 978-0-670-91817-1
- The News from Dublin. Pan Macmillan. 26 March 2026. ISBN 978-1-0350-3073-6.

=== Poetry collections ===
- Vinegar Hill, Beacon Press, 2022, ISBN 978-0807006535

=== Non-fiction ===
- Martyrs and Metaphors, Letters from the New Island, vol. 1, no. 2., Dublin: Raven Arts Press, 1987, ISBN 978-1-85186-036-4
- The Trial of the Generals: Selected Journalism, 1980–1990, Dublin: Raven Arts Press, 1990, ISBN 978-1-85186-081-4
- Homage to Barcelona, Simon & Schuster, 1990, ISBN 978-0-671-71061-3 (revised edition Picador, 2002, ISBN 978-0-330-37356-2)
- Bad Blood: A Walk Along the Irish Border, Picador, 1994, ISBN 978-0-330-52097-3
- The Sign of the Cross: Travels in Catholic Europe, Jonathan Cape, 1994, ISBN 978-0-224-03767-9
- Love in a Dark Time: Gay Lives From Wilde to Almodovar, Picador, 2002, ISBN 978-0-330-49137-2 (First English edition; Australian edition published 2001)
- Lady Gregory's Toothbrush, University of Wisconsin Press, 2002, ISBN 978-0-299-18000-3
- The Use of Reason, Picador, 2006, ISBN 978-0-330-44573-3
- Sean Scully: Walls of Aran. Thames & Hudson. 2007. ISBN 978-0-500-54339-9.
- A Guest at the Feast. A Memoir, Penguin, 2011, ISBN 978-0-241-96229-9
- New Ways to Kill Your Mother: Writers and their Families, Penguin, 2012, ISBN 978-1-4516-6855-1
- On Elizabeth Bishop, Princeton University Press, 2015, ISBN 9780691154114
- Mad, Bad, Dangerous to Know: The Fathers of Wilde, Yeats, and Joyce, Scribner, 2018, ISBN 978-1476785172
- A Guest at the Feast: Essays, Viking, 2022, ISBN 9780241004630

==== Collaborative ====
- Colm Tóibín (1987). Walking Along the Border. With photographs by Tony O'Shea. London: Macdonald. ISBN 9780356172484. (republished in 1994 without photographs as Bad Blood).
- Colm Tóibín (1990), Dubliners, O'Shea, Tony (illus.), London: Macdonald, ISBN 0-356-17641-X
- Tóibín, Colm; Callil, Carmel (1999), The Modern Library: The Two Hundred Best Novels in English Since 1950, Picador, ISBN 978-0-330-34182-0
- The Irish Famine. A Documentary. With Diarmaid Ferriter, Profile Books Limited, 2001. ISBN 9781861972491
- Schneider, Gregor; O'Hagan, Andrew; Tóibín, Colm (2004), Die Familie Schneider, Artangel, ISBN 978-3-86521-236-8

==== As editor ====
- The Guinness Book of Ireland, Guinness World Records, 1995, ISBN 978-0-85112-597-8
- The Kilfenora Teaboy: A Study of Paul Durcan, New Island Books, 1996, ISBN 978-1-874597-31-5
- The Penguin Book of Irish Fiction, Penguin/Viking, 1999, ISBN 978-0-670-85497-4

== Plays ==
- Beauty in a Broken Place (staged in Dublin in 2004)

== Screenwriting ==
- Return to Montauk (2017)

== Articles ==
Asked in 2021 how many articles he had written, Tóibín was uncertain: "I suppose thousands might be accurate", he told The New Yorker.

=== Literary book reviews ===
Year	Review article	Work(s) reviewed
1993	"The Built-in Reader". London Review of Books. Vol. 15, no. 7. 8 April 1993.	Beckett, Samuel (1992). O'Brien, Eoin; Fournier, Edith (eds.). Dream of Fair to Middling Women. Black Cat. ISBN 0-7145-4212-1.
1994	"Insiderish". London Review of Books. Vol. 16, no. 10. 26 May 1994.	Brodkey, Harold (1994). Profane Friendship. Jonathan Cape. ISBN 0-224-03775-7.
1994	"The South". London Review of Books. Vol. 16, no. 15. 4 August 1994.	One Art: The Selected Letters of Elizabeth Bishop. Chatto & Windus. 1994. ISBN 0-7011-6195-7.
1995	"Like Learning to Swim in Early Middle Age". London Review of Books. Vol. 17, no. 8. 20 April 1995.	Gunn, Thom (1994). Shelf Life: Essays, Memoirs and an Interview. Faber & Faber. ISBN 0-571-17196-6.
1996	"Why should you be the only ones that sin?". London Review of Books. Vol. 18, no. 17. 5 September 1996.	Heilbut, Anthony (1996). Thomas Mann: Eros and Literature. Macmillan. ISBN 978-0-39-455633-8.; Hayman, Ronald (1996). Thomas Mann: A Biography. Bloomsbury. ISBN 0-7475-2531-5.; Prater, Donald (1995). Thomas Mann: A Life. Oxford University Press. ISBN 0-19-815861-0.
2000	"Gaelic Gloom". London Review of Books. Vol. 22, no. 15. 10 August 2000.	Sampson, Denis (1998). Brian Moore: The Chameleon Novelist. Marino Books. ISBN 1-86023-078-4.
2003	"A Djinn speaks". London Review of Books. Vol. 25, no. 4. 4 February 2003.	Saddlemyer, Ann (2002). Becoming George: The Life of Mrs W. B. Yeats. Oxford University Press. ISBN 0-19-811232-7.
2004	"Return to Catalonia". The New York Review of Books. Vol. LI, no. 15. 7 October 2004.	Cercas, Javier; McLean, Anne (2004). Soldiers of Salamis. Bloosmbury. ISBN 978-1582343846.
2006	"Don't abandon me". London Review of Books. Vol. 28, no. 9. 11 May 2006.	Williamson, Edwin (2005). Borges: A Life. Penguin. ISBN 0-14-024657-6.
2006	"A Thousand Prayers". The New York Review of Books. Vol. LIII, no. 19. 30 November 2006.	Li, Yiyun (2005). A Thousand Years of Good Prayers. Random House. ISBN 978-1400063123.
2007	"Dissecting the Body". London Review of Books. Vol. 29, no. 8. 26 April 2007.	McEwan, Ian (2007). On Chesil Beach. Jonathan Cape. ISBN 978-0-224-08118-4.
2008	"The Shadow of Rose". The New York Review of Books. Vol. LIV, no. 20. 20 December 2007.	Williams, Tennessee (2007). Bradham Thornton, Margaret (ed.). Notebooks. Yale University Press. ISBN 978-0300116823.
2008	"A Man with My Trouble". London Review of Books. Vol. 30, no. 1. 3 January 2008.	Walker, Pierre; Zacharias, Greg (2007). The Complete Letters of Henry James, 1855–72: Volume I. University of Nebraska Press. ISBN 978-0-8032-2584-8.; Walker, Pierre; Zacharias, Greg (2007). The Complete Letters of Henry James, 1855–72: Volume II. University of Nebraska Press. ISBN 978-0-8032-2607-4.
2008	"A Great American Visionary". The New York Review of Books. Vol. LV, no. 6. 17 April 2008.	Crane, Hart (2006). Complete Poems and Selected Letters. Library of America. ISBN 978-1931082990.
2008	"I Could Sleep with All of Them". London Review of Books. Vol. 30, no. 21. 6 November 2008.	Weiss, Andrea (2008). In the Shadow of the Magic Mountain: The Erika and Klaus Mann Story. University of Chicago Press. ISBN 978-0-226-88672-5.
2009	"Follow-the-Leader". London Review of Books. Vol. 31, no. 9. 14 May 2009.	Travisano, Thomas; Hamilton, Saskia, eds. (2008). Words in Air: The Complete Correspondence Between Elizabeth Bishop and Robert Lowell. Faber & Faber. ISBN 978-0-571-24308-2.
2009	"The Admirable Mrs James". The New York Review of Books. Vol. LVI, no. 10. 11 June 2009.	Gunter, Susan E. (2009). Alice in Jamesland: The Story of Alice Howe Gibbens James. University of Nebraska Press. ISBN 978-0803215696.; Fisher, Paul (2008). House of Wits: An Intimate Portrait of the James Family. Henry Holt. ISBN 978-0805074901.
2009	"Who to Be". London Review of Books. Vol. 31, no. 15. 6 August 2009.	Dow Fehsenfeld, Martha; More Overback, Lois, eds. (2009). The Letters of Samuel Beckett, 1929–40. Cambridge University Press. ISBN 978-0-521-86793-1.
2009	"My God, the Suburbs!". London Review of Books. Vol. 31, no. 21. 5 November 2009.	Bailey, Blake (2009). Cheever: A Life. Picador. ISBN 978-0-330-43790-5.
2010	"The Genius of Thom Gunn". The New York Review of Books. Vol. LVII, no. 1. 14 January 2010.	Gunn, Thom (2009). Kleinzahler, August (ed.). Selected Poems. Farrar, Straus and Giroux. ISBN 978-0374258597.; Greville, Fulke (2009). Gunn, Thom (ed.). Selected Poems of Fulke Greville. University of Chicago Press. ISBN 9780226308463.; Weiner, Joshua, ed. (2009). At the Barriers: On the Poetry of Thom Gunn. University of Chicago Press. ISBN 978-0-226-89043-2.
2011	"The Mysterious Powers of the Word". The New York Review of Books. Vol. LVIII, no. 14. 29 September 2011.	Gordimer, Nadine (2011). Life Times: Stories, 1952–2007. Farrar, Straus and Giroux. ISBN 978-0374270537.; Gordimer, Nadine (2010). Telling Times: Writing and Living, 1950–2008. Norton. ISBN 978-0-393-06628-9.
2011	"Mann v. Mann". London Review of Books. Vol. 33, no. 21. 3 November 2011.	Juers, Evelyn (2011). House of Exile: War, Love and Literature, from Berlin to Los Angeles. Allen Lane. ISBN 978-1-84614-461-5.
2012	"Going Beyond the Limits". The New York Review of Books. Vol. LIX, no. 8. 10 May 2012.	Barnes, Julian (2011). The Sense of an Ending. Knopf. ISBN 978-0-224-09415-3.
2012	"A Man of No Mind". London Review of Books. Vol. 34, no. 17. 13 September 2012.	Vargas Llosa, Mario; Grossman, Edith (2012). The Dream of the Celt. Faber & Faber. ISBN 978-0-571-27571-7.
2012	"The Book of Kells by Bernard Meehan – review: A scholarly update of a book illustrated by monks reveals why it meant so much to James Joyce". The Guardian. 9 December 2012.	Meehan, Bernard (2012). The Book of Kells. Thames & Hudson.
2013	"Places Never Explained". London Review of Books. Vol. 35, no. 15. 8 August 2013.	Post, Jonathan, ed. (2012). The Selected Letters of Anthony Hecht. Johns Hopkins University Press. ISBN 978-1-4214-0730-2.
2014	"Lust and Loss in Madrid: The novels of Javier Marías and Antonio Muñoz Molina". The New York Review of Books. Vol. LXI, no. 12. 10 July 2014.	Marías, Javier; Jull Costa, Margaret (2013). The Infatuations. Knopf. ISBN 978-0307960726.; Muñoz Molina, Antonio; Grossman, Edith (2013). In The Night of Time. Houghton Mifflin Harcourt. ISBN 978-0547547848.
2014	"Putting Religion in Its Place". London Review of Books. Vol. 36, no. 20. 23 October 2014.	Robinson, Marilynne (2014). Lila. Virago. ISBN 978-1-84408-880-5.
2015	"The Hard-Won Truth of the North". The New York Review of Books. Vol. LXII, no. 12. 9 July 2015.	Dagerman, Stig; Macpherson Fulton, Robin (2011). German Autumn. University of Minnesota Press. ISBN 978-0816677528.; Dagerman, Stig; Thompson, Laurie (2012). Island of the Doomed. University of Minnesota Press. ISBN 978-0816677986.; Dagerman, Stig; Mier-Cruz, Benjamin (2013). A Burnt Child. University of Minnesota Press. ISBN 978-0816677993.; Dagerman, Stig; Hartman, Steven (2013). Sleet: Selected Stories. Godine. ISBN 978-1567924466.
2015	"She Played Hard with Happiness". The New York Review of Books. Vol. LXII, no. 20. 17 December 2015.	Lispector, Clarice; Dodson, Katrina (2015). Moser, Benjamin (ed.). The Complete Stories. New Directions. ISBN 9780811219631.
2017	"Shadows & Ghosts". The New York Review of Books. Vol. LXIV, no. 8. 11 May 2017.	Coetzee, J. M. (2017). The Schooldays of Jesus. Viking. ISBN 978-0735222663.
2017	"Joyce in Court and The Ulysses Trials review". The Guardian. 6 July 2017.	Hardiman, Adrian (2017). Joyce in Court. Head of Zeus. ISBN 9781786691583.; Hassett, Joseph M. (2016). The Ulysses Trials: Beauty and Truth Meet the Law. The Lilliput Press. ISBN 978-1843516682.
2018	"The Heart of Conrad". The New York Review of Books. Vol. 65, no. 3. 22 February 2018. pp. 8–11.	Jasanoff, Maya. The Dawn Watch: Joseph Conrad in a Global World. Penguin.
2018	"On Not Being Sylvia Plath". London Review of Books. Vol. 40, no. 17. 13 September 2018.	Gunn, Thom (2017). Selected Poems. Faber & Faber. ISBN 978-0-571-32769-0.
2018	"The Aristocracy's Swann Song". The New York Review of Books. Vol. LXV, no. 15. 11 October 2018.	Weber, Caroline (2018). Proust's Duchess: How Three Celebrated Women Captured the Imagination of Fin-de-Siècle Paris. Knopf. ISBN 978-0307961785.
2020	"Wobble in My Mind". London Review of Books. Vol. 42, no. 9. 7 May 2020.	Hamilton, Saskia, ed. (2020). The Dolphin Letters, 1970–79: Elizabeth Hardwick, Robert Lowell and Their Circle. Faber & Faber. ISBN 978-0-571-35741-3.; Lowell, Robert (2019). Hamilton, Saskia (ed.). The Dolphin: Two Versions, 1972–73. Farrar, Straus and Giroux. ISBN 978-0-374-53827-9.
2021	"We Must Be Light!". The New York Review of Books. Vol. LXVIII, no. 10. 10 June 2021.	Hammer, Langdon; Yenser, Stephen, eds. (2021). A Whole World: Letters from James Merrill. Knopf. ISBN 978-1-101-87550-6.
2021	"The Pages by Hugo Hamilton review – a book with a story to tell". The Guardian. 1 August 2021.	Hamilton, Hugo (2021). The Pages. 4th Estate. ISBN 978-0008451660.
2021	"I haven't been I". London Review of Books. Vol. 43, no. 16. 12 August 2021.	Zenith, Richard (2021). Pessoa: An Experimental Life. Allen Lane. ISBN 978-0-241-53413-7.
2022	"Snail Slow". London Review of Books. Vol. 44, no. 2. 27 January 2022.	Shovlin, Frank, ed. (2021). The Letters of John McGahern. Faber & Faber. ISBN 978-0-571-32666-2.
2023	"Arruginated". London Review of Books. Vol. 45, no. 17. 7 September 2023.	Slote, Sam; Mamigonian, Marc A.; Turner, John (2022). Annotations to James Joyce's 'Ulysses'. Oxford University Press. ISBN 978-0-19-886458-5.
2023	"In the Streets of Barcelona". The New York Review of Books. Vol. LXX, no. 20. 21 December 2023.	Goytisolo, Luis; Riley, Brendan (2022). Antagonía. Dalkey Archive Press. ISBN 978-1628973983.

=== Introductions ===
Year	Article	Subject	Notes
2024	"Colm Tóibín on poet Paul Durcan turning 80: 'Beside the wildness, there is tenderness'". The Irish Times. 5 October 2024.	Paul Durcan	This is the introduction to 80 at 80, a selection of the poet's works, which was edited by Niall MacMonagle and published on 16 October 2024, to coincide with Durcan's 80th birthday.

=== Himself, on his own work ===
Year	Article	Subject	Notes
2012	"Colm Tóibín: writers and their families". The Guardian. 17 February 2012.	Himself and his family; his novel The Heather Blazing	With discursions onto W. B. Yeats; V. S. Naipaul; Jorge Luis Borges; George Moore; James Joyce; John Millington Synge; Henry James; the Mann family; James Baldwin; Samuel Beckett
2012	"The inspiration for The Testament of Mary". The Guardian. 19 October 2012.	His novel The Testament of Mary	On Mary, mother of Jesus
2013	"Those Dickens Kids: What Happened?". The New York Review of Books. Vol. LX, no. 9. 23 May 2013.	His novel The South	—N/a
2014	"Colm Tóibín: the literature of grief". The Guardian. 2 October 2014.	His novel Nora Webster	With discursions onto Mary Lavin's short stories; Hamlet; Anne Carson, Euripides, Sophocles and Fiona Shaw; C. S. Lewis, Julian Barnes and Joyce Carol Oates; Joan Didion and Francisco Goldman; Nadine Gordimer and Juan Goytisolo

=== Other articles on literature ===
Year	Article	Subject	Notes
1994	"How many nipples had Graham Greene?". London Review of Books. Vol. 16, no. 11. 9 June 1994.	Graham Greene	Auctioning his letters
2001	"Lady Gregory's Toothbrush". The New York Review of Books. Vol. XLVIII, no. 13. 9 August 2001.	—N/a	—N/a
2001	"The Last Witness". London Review of Books. Vol. 23, no. 18. 20 September 2001.	James Baldwin	Also covers Martin Luther King, the civil rights movement and William Styron
2006	"Henry James's New York". The New York Review of Books. Vol. LIII, no. 2. 9 February 2006.	Henry James	—N/a
2006	"Happy Birthday, Sam!". The New York Review of Books. Vol. LIII, no. 7. 27 April 2006.	Samuel Beckett	Including his attendance at a lecture by Carl Jung
2007	"My Darlings". London Review of Books. Vol. 29, no. 7. 5 April 2007.	Samuel Beckett	His Irish actors
2007	"Creating 'The Portrait of a Lady'". The New York Review of Books. Vol. LIV, no. 12. 19 July 2007.	Henry James (and George Eliot)	—N/a
2008	"The Art of Being Found Out". London Review of Books. Vol. 30, no. 6. 20 March 2008.	Henry James	—N/a
2008	"James Baldwin & Barack Obama". The New York Review of Books. Vol. LV, no. 16. 23 October 2008.	James Baldwin	—N/a
2009	"Hopkins: The Odd Man Out". The New York Review of Books (online). 26 October 2009.	Gerard Manley Hopkins	—N/a
2011	"The Importance of Aunts". London Review of Books. Vol. 33, no. 6. 17 March 2011.	—N/a	(in the 19th-century novel)
2012	"Colm Tóibín on Joyce's Dublin: city of dreamers and chancers". The Guardian. 15 June 2012.	Dubliners	Published the day before Bloomsday, in a month when James Joyce's short story collection was resissued
2012	"Brian Friel: trapped in silence". The Guardian. 10 August 2012.	Brian Friel	—N/a
2013	"The Sweet Troubles of Proust". The New York Review of Books. 22 February 2013.	Marcel Proust	—N/a
2013	"Seamus Heaney's books were events in our lives". The Guardian. 30 August 2013.	Seamus Heaney	His generosity; Dennis O'Driscoll; Peter Brook; the change in Heaney's work after his eighth collection Seeing Things (1991)
2014	"Clarice Lispector's The Hour of the Star is as bewildering as it is brilliant". The Guardian. 18 January 2014.	The Hour of the Star	In the month that this, with other Clarice Lipsector titles, was reissued
2015	"Gawking at Quixote". The New York Review of Books (online). 15 April 2015.	Don Quixote	—N/a
2015	"I embraced Henry James's fight against complacency". The Guardian. 28 August 2015.	The Ambassadors	The effects this Henry James novel had on Tóibín
2016	"James Joyce's Portrait of the Artist , 100 years on". The Guardian. 29 December 2016.	A Portrait of the Artist as a Young Man	29 December 2016 was the centenary of its publication.
2016	"Colm Tóibín on that fine writer Anthony Cronin". The Irish Times. 29 December 2016.	Anthony Cronin	See below
2017	"Anthony Cronin obituary". The Guardian. 24 January 2017.	Anthony Cronin	Obituary for "an important mentor" of Tóibín
2020	"Louise Glück: Colm Tóibín on a brave and truthful Nobel winner". The Guardian. 9 October 2020.	Louise Glück	2020 Nobel Prize in Literature
2023	"Louise Glück: a poet who never shied away from silence, pain or fear". The Guardian. 17 October 2023.	Louise Glück	Response to Glück's death
2024	"The Pitch of Passion". The New York Review of Books (online). 2 August 2024.	Go Tell It on the Mountain	2 August 2024 was the centennial of James Baldwin's birth.
2024	"Freud and the Writers". On the Couch: Writers Analyze Sigmund Freud. Princeton University Press, edited by Andrew Blauner. pp. 83–97.	Sigmund Freud, Thomas Mann, Henry James	Tóibín examines the three writers' initial enthusiasm for the outbreak of World War I.
2025	"Why I set up a press to publish Nobel winner László Krasznahorkai". The Guardian. 10 October 2025.	László Krasznahorkai	2025 Nobel Prize in Literature

- "Freud and the Writers", in Blauner, Andrew, ed., On the Couch: Writers Analyze Sigmund Freud, Princeton and Oxford: Princeton University Press, 2024, ISBN 9780691242439

=== Articles on other topics ===
Year	Article	Subject	Notes
1994	"In the Pyrenees". London Review of Books. Vol. 16, no. 1. 6 January 1994.		—N/a
1998	"Erasures". London Review of Books. Vol. 20, no. 15. 30 July 1998.	The Great Famine	—N/a
2001	"11 September". London Review of Books. Vol. 23, no. 23. 29 November 2001.	September 11 attacks	Opposing Mary Beard's excuses for the September 11 attackers
2009	"Missing the Point". London Review of Books. 15 December 2009.	Art, allegory and urination	—N/a
2021	"The Bergoglio Smile". London Review of Books. Vol. 43, no. 2. 21 January 2021.	Pope Francis	—N/a
2026	"Reimagining the Future of Ireland". The New York Review of Books. Vol. LXXIII, no. 7. 23 April 2026. pp. 50–52.	Review of Fintan O'Toole and Sam McBride, For and Against a United Ireland, University of Notre Dame Press, 177 pp. Quote: "The book is data-led, the arguments rational, the tone exemplary in its calmness. ... O'Toole and McBride recognize that the ... possibility of a referendum 'affects the way people think about a wide range of political, social and cultural issues in the here and now.' They recognize that if unity were to come through referendum, then 'loser's consent,' which they define as 'the willingness of those disappointed by the outcome to live with it because they accept that it is the freely expressed desire of the majority,' will be 'vital to the future peace and prosperity of everyone on the island.'" (p. 51.)	

== Poems ==
Title	Year	First published	Reprinted/collected	Notes
"Cush Gap, 2007"	2011	The Times Literary Supplement		Cush Gap, a location in County Wexford, is also mentioned in works such as Brooklyn.
"Miró"; "In San Clemente"; "Lost for Words"; "Face"; "The Torturer's Art"	2017	The Times Literary Supplement		—N/a
"Father & Son"	2021	The New York Review of Books		—N/a
"Vinegar Hill"	2022	The New Yorker		—N/a

== Short stories ==
Title	Year	First published	Reprinted/collected	Notes
"A Priest in the Family"	2004	London Review of Books	Mothers and Sons	—N/a
"Barcelona, 1975"	2005	The Dublin Review		On the first orgy that Toibín attended at the age of twenty, at the house of an older painter. "The story is entirely real", Tóibín later said.
"One Minus One"	2007	"vol. 91, no. 5, pp. 78–83". The New Yorker. 30 April 2007.		About the death of his mother
"Sleep"	2015	"vol. 91, no. 5, pp. 78–83". The New Yorker. 23 March 2015.		—N/a
"Summer of '38"	2013	"Summer of '38". The New Yorker. Vol. 89, no. 3. 4 March 2013. pp. 58–65.		—N/a
