= Tony O'Shea (photographer) =

Irish photographer

Tony O'Shea (born 1947) is an Irish photographer who has made work about Irish life. He lives in Dublin.

== Life and work ==
O'Shea was born in Valentia Island off the Iveragh Peninsula in County Kerry, Ireland and lived there for 20 years. He studied English and Philosophy at University College Dublin. From 1981 he worked full-time as a photographer with In Dublin magazine. When In Dublin ceased publication, O'Shea worked as a press photographer for Sunday Business Post for many years.

== Personal life ==
O'Shea lives in Dublin with his wife Sarah, and their daughters Keelin and Siúin.

== Publications ==
=== Books of work by O'Shea ===
- Bad Blood: A Walk Along the Irish Border. Macmillan, 1987. Writing by Colm Tóibín, photographs by O'Shea.
- Dubliners. London: Macdonald illustrated, 1990. Photographs by O'Shea, text by Tóibín. ISBN 9780356176413.
  - Little, Brown, 1992.
- The Light of Day. Bristol: RRB; Dublin: Gallery of Photography Ireland, 2020. With a text by Tóibín. "The book is a retrospective of O'Shea's work, spanning 4 decades from 1979 to 2019 and is published to coincide with an exhibition of his work at the Gallery of Photography Ireland."

=== Zines of work by O'Shea ===
- Christmas Turkey Market, Dublin, 1990–1993. Southport: Café Royal, 2015.
- Italia 90: Dublin. Southport: Café Royal, 2017. Edition of 200 copies.
- Border Roads 1990–1994. Southport: Café Royal, 2017. Edition of 250 copies.
- Never Forget. Southport: Café Royal, 2017. Edition of 250 copies.
- Ways of the Cross. Southport: Café Royal, 2018. Edition of 250 copies.

== Exhibitions ==
- Irish Gallery of Photography, Dublin, 1990
