= List of accolades received by Brooklyn =

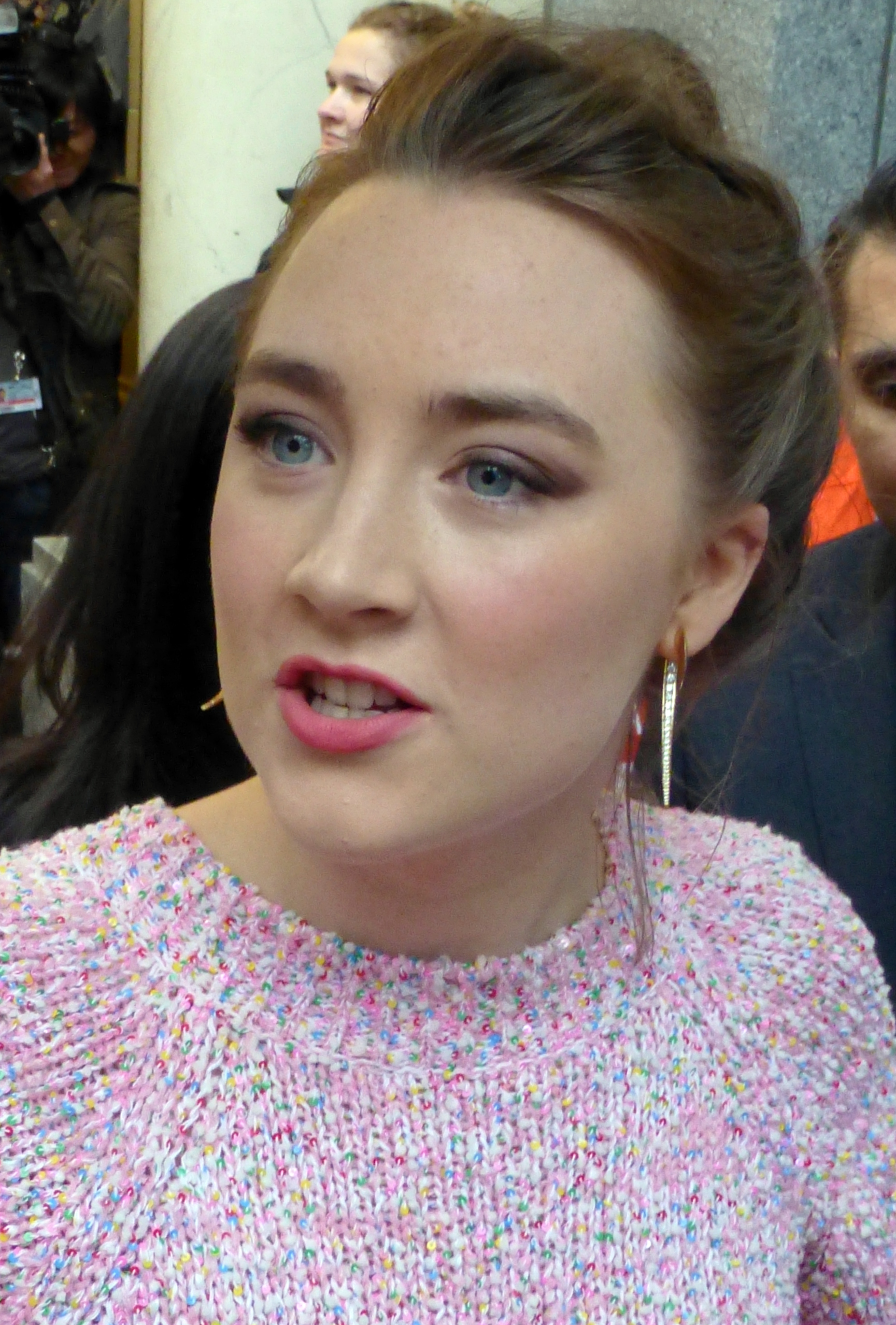
- Saoirse Ronan has received several awards and nominations for her performance in the film
Accolades
Award	Won	Nominated
AACTA International Awards	0	1
AARP Movies For Grownups Awards	0	2
Academy Awards	0	3
Austin Film Critics Association	0	1
British Academy Film Awards	1	6
Boston Society of Film Critics	1	1
British Independent Film Awards	1	5
Camerimage	0	1
Canadian Screen Awards	2	3
Casting Society of America	0	1
Chicago Film Critics Association	0	3
Critics' Choice Movie Awards	0	5
Costume Designers Guild Awards	0	1
Dallas–Fort Worth Film Critics Association	1	2
Denver Film Festival	1	1
Detroit Film Critics Society	1	5
Dorian Awards	0	2
Dublin Film Critics' Circle	1	3
Evening Standard British Film Awards	1	3
Golden Globe Awards	0	1
Golden Trailer Awards	1	3
Hamptons International Film Festival	1	1
Hollywood Film Awards	1	1
Houston Film Critics Society	0	1
Irish Film & Television Academy	2	4
London Film Critics' Circle	1	4
Los Angeles Film Critics Association	1	1
Mill Valley Film Festival	1	1
National Society of Film Critics	1	1
New York Film Critics Circle	1	1
New York Film Critics Online	1	1
Online Film Critics Society	0	3
Palm Springs International Film Festival	1	1
Producers Guild of America	0	1
Québec Cinéma Awards	2	2
San Diego Film Critics Society	1	7
San Francisco Film Critics Circle	2	5
Santa Barbara International Film Festival	1	1
St. Louis Film Critics Association	3	3
Satellite Awards	1	2
Screen Actors Guild	0	1
USC Scripter Award	0	1
Vancouver Film Critics Circle	0	1
Vancouver International Film Festival	1	1
Virginia Film Festival	1	1
Washington D.C. Area Film Critics Association	1	6
Women's Image Network Awards	0	2
- Total number of awards and nominations^{[I]}
Totals	35	105
- References

Brooklyn is a 2015 historical drama film directed by John Crowley. Writer Nick Hornby adapted the screenplay from Colm Tóibín's novel of the same name. The plot follows Eilis Lacey (Saoirse Ronan), a young Irish woman who emigrates to Brooklyn to find employment. There she marries an Italian plumber called Tony (Emory Cohen), before being forced to choose between her home town of Enniscorthy or her new life in Brooklyn. The film premiered at the 2015 Sundance Film Festival. It was released by Fox Searchlight Pictures in a limited capacity on 6 November 2015.

Brooklyn gathered awards and nominations in a variety of categories with particular praise for Ronan's performance, Crowley's direction and Hornby's screenplay. The film received 3 nominations at the 88th Academy Awards and 6 nominations at the 69th British Academy Film Awards. At the British Independent Film Awards, the film earned 5 nominations, with Ronan going on to win Best Actress. The film also garnered five nominations at the 21st Critics' Choice Awards. Brooklyn was named Best Irish Film by the Dublin Film Critics' Circle and nominated for four accolades by the London Film Critics' Circle. The film's production designer François Séguin won the Best Production Design award from the San Diego Film Critics Society, where Brooklyn was nominated for a further six awards.

Ronan has won Best Actress awards for her performance as Eilis from the Hollywood Film Awards, New York Film Critics Circle, San Francisco Film Critics Circle and the Washington D.C. Area Film Critics Association. She is further nominated for the Golden Globe Award for Best Actress in a Drama Motion Picture, a Satellite Award and a Screen Actors Guild Award. Brooklyn was included in Dallas–Fort Worth Film Critics Association and the New York Film Critics Online Top 10 Films. It was also awarded the People's Choice Award for Best Narrative Feature at the Denver Film Festival, the Audience Favorite Gold Award in World Cinema at the Mill Valley Film Festival, the Rogers People's Choice Award at the Vancouver International Film Festival and the Audience Award for Best Narrative Feature at the Virginia Film Festival. Hornby's script received a USC Scripter Award nomination for Best Adapted Screenplay.

== Awards and nominations ==
Award / Film Festival	Date of ceremony^{[II]}	Category	Recipient(s)	Result	Ref(s)
AACTA International Awards	29 January 2016	Best Actress	Saoirse Ronan	Nominated	
AARP Movies For Grownups Awards	8 February 2016	Best Picture	Brooklyn	Nominated	
AARP Movies For Grownups Awards	8 February 2016	Best Screenwriter	Nick Hornby	Nominated	
Academy Awards	28 February 2016	Best Picture	Finola Dwyer and Amanda Posey	Nominated	
Academy Awards	28 February 2016	Best Actress	Saoirse Ronan	Nominated	
Academy Awards	28 February 2016	Best Adapted Screenplay	Nick Hornby	Nominated	
Austin Film Critics Association	29 December 2015	Best Actress	Saoirse Ronan	Nominated	
Boston Society of Film Critics	11 December 2015	Best Actress	Saoirse Ronan	Runner-up	
British Academy Film Awards	14 February 2016	Best Actress in a Leading Role	Saoirse Ronan	Nominated	
British Academy Film Awards	14 February 2016	Best Actress in a Supporting Role	Julie Walters	Nominated	
British Academy Film Awards	14 February 2016	Best Adapted Screenplay	Nick Hornby	Nominated	
British Academy Film Awards	14 February 2016	Best British Film	Brooklyn	Won	
British Academy Film Awards	14 February 2016	Best Costume Design	Odile Dicks-Mireaux	Nominated	
British Academy Film Awards	14 February 2016	Best Makeup and Hair	Morna Ferguson and Lorraine Glynn	Nominated	
British Independent Film Awards	7 December 2015	Best Actress	Saoirse Ronan	Won	
British Independent Film Awards	7 December 2015	Best Screenplay	Nick Hornby	Nominated	
British Independent Film Awards	7 December 2015	Best Supporting Actor	Domhnall Gleeson	Nominated	
British Independent Film Awards	7 December 2015	Best Supporting Actress	Julie Walters	Nominated	
British Independent Film Awards	7 December 2015	Best Technical Achievement	Fiona Weir	Nominated	
Camerimage	21 November 2015	Golden Frog	Yves Bélanger	Nominated	
Canadian Screen Awards	13 March 2016	Best Cinematography	Yves Bélanger	Won	
Canadian Screen Awards	13 March 2016	Best Motion Picture	Pierre Even, Marie-Claude Poulin, Finola Dwyer, Amanda Posey	Nominated	
Canadian Screen Awards	13 March 2016	Best Original Score	Michael Brook	Won	
Casting Society of America	21 January 2016	Best Casting for Studio or Independent Drama	Fiona Weir, Lucie Robitaille, Jim Carnahan	Nominated	
Chicago Film Critics Association	16 December 2015	Best Actress	Saoirse Ronan	Nominated	
Chicago Film Critics Association	16 December 2015	Best Adapted Screenplay	Nick Hornby	Nominated	
Chicago Film Critics Association	16 December 2015	Best Art Direction	Brooklyn	Nominated	
Critics' Choice Movie Awards	17 January 2016	Best Actress	Saoirse Ronan	Nominated	
Critics' Choice Movie Awards	17 January 2016	Best Adapted Screenplay	Nick Hornby	Nominated	
Critics' Choice Movie Awards	17 January 2016	Best Art Direction	François Séguin, Jennifer Oman, Louise Tremblay	Nominated	
Critics' Choice Movie Awards	17 January 2016	Best Costume Design	Odile Dicks-Mireaux	Nominated	
Critics' Choice Movie Awards	17 January 2016	Best Picture	Brooklyn	Nominated	
Costume Designers Guild Awards	23 February 2016	Excellence in Period Film	Odile Dicks-Mireaux	Nominated	
Dallas–Fort Worth Film Critics Association	14 December 2015	Best Actress	Saoirse Ronan	Nominated	
Dallas–Fort Worth Film Critics Association	14 December 2015	Top 10 Films	Brooklyn	Won	
Denver Film Festival	16 November 2015	People's Choice Award for Best Narrative Feature	Brooklyn	Won	
Detroit Film Critics Society	14 December 2015	Best Actress	Saoirse Ronan	Won	
Detroit Film Critics Society	14 December 2015	Best Director	John Crowley	Nominated	
Detroit Film Critics Society	14 December 2015	Best Film	Brooklyn	Nominated	
Detroit Film Critics Society	14 December 2015	Best Screenplay	Nick Hornby	Nominated	
Detroit Film Critics Society	14 December 2015	Breakthrough	Emory Cohen	Nominated	
Dorian Awards	19 January 2016	Film Performance of the Year – Actress	Saoirse Ronan	Nominated	
Dorian Awards	19 January 2016	Film of the Year	Brooklyn	Nominated	
Dublin Film Critics' Circle	22 December 2015	Best Actress	Saoirse Ronan	Nominated	
Dublin Film Critics' Circle	22 December 2015	Best Director	John Crowley	Nominated	
Dublin Film Critics' Circle	22 December 2015	Best Irish Film	Brooklyn	Won	
Evening Standard British Film Awards	7 February 2016	Best Actress	Saoirse Ronan	Nominated	
Evening Standard British Film Awards	7 February 2016	Best Film	Brooklyn	Won	
Evening Standard British Film Awards	7 February 2016	Best Screenplay	Nick Hornby	Nominated	
Golden Globe Awards	10 January 2016	Best Actress in a Motion Picture – Drama	Saoirse Ronan	Nominated	
Golden Trailer Awards	May 2016	Best Foreign Romance	"Two Worlds" – Lionsgate Films UK and Create Advertising London	Won	
Golden Trailer Awards	May 2016	Best Romance Poster	"Boat" One-Sheet – Fox Searchlight and Ignition	Nominated	
Golden Trailer Awards	May 2016	Best Romance TV Spot	"Looking Review" – Fox Searchlight and Create Advertising Group	Nominated	
Hamptons International Film Festival	12 October 2015	Breakthrough Performer	Emory Cohen	Won	
Hollywood Film Awards	1 November 2015	New Hollywood Award	Saoirse Ronan	Won	
Houston Film Critics Society	9 January 2016	Best Actress	Saoirse Ronan	Nominated	
Irish Film & Television Academy	9 April 2016	Actress in a Lead Role	Saoirse Ronan	Won	
Irish Film & Television Academy	9 April 2016	Actress in a Supporting Role	Jane Brennan	Won	
Irish Film & Television Academy	9 April 2016	Best Director	John Crowley	Nominated	
Irish Film & Television Academy	9 April 2016	Best Film	Brooklyn	Nominated	
London Film Critics' Circle	17 January 2016	Actress of the Year	Saoirse Ronan	Nominated	
London Film Critics' Circle	17 January 2016	British/Irish Actress of the Year	Saoirse Ronan	Won	
London Film Critics' Circle	17 January 2016	British Film of the Year	Brooklyn	Nominated	
London Film Critics' Circle	17 January 2016	Screenwriter of the Year	Nick Hornby	Nominated	
Los Angeles Film Critics Association	6 December 2015	Best Actress	Saoirse Ronan	Runner-up	
Mill Valley Film Festival	18 October 2015	Audience Favorite Gold Award in World Cinema	Brooklyn	Won	
National Society of Film Critics	3 January 2016	Best Actress	Saoirse Ronan	Runner-up	
New York Film Critics Circle	2 December 2015	Best Actress	Saoirse Ronan	Won	
New York Film Critics Online	6 December 2015	Top 10 Films	Brooklyn	Won	
Online Film Critics Society	14 December 2015	Best Actress	Saoirse Ronan	Nominated	
Online Film Critics Society	14 December 2015	Best Adapted Screenplay	Nick Hornby	Nominated	
Online Film Critics Society	14 December 2015	Best Picture	Brooklyn	Nominated	
Palm Springs International Film Festival	2 January 2016	International Star Award	Saoirse Ronan	Won	
Producers Guild of America Awards	23 January 2016	Best Theatrical Motion Picture	Amanda Posey and Finola Dwyer	Nominated	
Québec Cinéma Awards	20 March 2016	Best Art Direction	François Séguin	Won	
Québec Cinéma Awards	20 March 2016	Best Cinematography	Yves Bélanger	Won	
San Diego Film Critics Society	14 December 2015	Best Actress	Saoirse Ronan	Nominated	
San Diego Film Critics Society	14 December 2015	Best Adapted Screenplay	Nick Hornby	Nominated	
San Diego Film Critics Society	14 December 2015	Best Cinematography	Yves Bélanger	Nominated	
San Diego Film Critics Society	14 December 2015	Best Director	John Crowley	Nominated	
San Diego Film Critics Society	14 December 2015	Best Film	Brooklyn	Nominated	
San Diego Film Critics Society	14 December 2015	Best Production Design	François Séguin	Won	
San Diego Film Critics Society	14 December 2015	Breakthrough Artist	Emory Cohen	Nominated	
San Francisco Film Critics Circle	14 December 2015	Best Actress	Saoirse Ronan	Won	
San Francisco Film Critics Circle	14 December 2015	Best Adapted Screenplay	Nick Hornby	Won	
San Francisco Film Critics Circle	14 December 2015	Best Director	John Crowley	Nominated	
San Francisco Film Critics Circle	14 December 2015	Best Picture	Brooklyn	Nominated	
San Francisco Film Critics Circle	14 December 2015	Best Production Design	François Séguin and Suzanne Cloutier	Nominated	
Santa Barbara International Film Festival	8 February 2016	Outstanding Performer of the Year	Saoirse Ronan	Won	
St. Louis Film Critics Association	21 December 2015	Best Actress	Saoirse Ronan	Runner-up	
St. Louis Film Critics Association	21 December 2015	Best Adapted Screenplay	Nick Hornby	Runner-up	
St. Louis Film Critics Association	21 December 2015	Best Art Direction	François Séguin	Runner-up	
Satellite Awards	21 February 2016	Best Actress in a Motion Picture	Saoirse Ronan	Won	
Satellite Awards	21 February 2016	Best Film	Brooklyn	Nominated	
Screen Actors Guild	30 January 2016	Outstanding Performance by a Female Actor in a Leading Role	Saoirse Ronan	Nominated	
USC Scripter Award	20 February 2016	Best Adapted Screenplay	Colm Tóibín and Nick Hornby	Nominated	
Vancouver Film Critics Circle	21 December 2015	Best Actress	Saoirse Ronan	Nominated	
Vancouver International Film Festival	9 October 2015	Rogers People's Choice Award	Brooklyn	Won	
Virginia Film Festival	11 November 2015	Audience Award for Best Narrative Feature	Brooklyn	Won	
Washington D.C. Area Film Critics Association	7 December 2015	Best Actress	Saoirse Ronan	Won	
Washington D.C. Area Film Critics Association	7 December 2015	Best Adapted Screenplay	Nick Hornby	Nominated	
Washington D.C. Area Film Critics Association	7 December 2015	Best Film	Brooklyn	Nominated	
Washington D.C. Area Film Critics Association	7 December 2015	Best Cinematography	Yves Bélanger	Nominated	
Washington D.C. Area Film Critics Association	7 December 2015	Best Original Score	Michael Brook	Nominated	
Washington D.C. Area Film Critics Association	7 December 2015	Best Production Design	Jennifer Oman and Louise Tremblay	Nominated	
Women's Image Network Awards	10 February 2016	Best Actress	Saoirse Ronan	Nominated	
Women's Image Network Awards	10 February 2016	Film Produced by a Woman	Finola Dwyer and Amanda Posey	Nominated	

== Notes ==
^{^[I]} Certain award groups do not simply award one winner. They recognize several different recipients and have runners-up. Since this is a specific recognition and is different from losing an award, runner-up mentions are considered wins in this award tally.

^{^[II]} Each date is linked to the article about the awards held that year, wherever possible.
