= Return to Montauk =

- Directed by: Volker Schlöndorff
- Written by: Volker Schlöndorff; Colm Tóibín
- Based on: Montauk by Max Frisch
- Produced by: Regina Ziegler; Til Schweiger; Stéphane Parthenay; Francis Boespflug; Conor Barry; Mike Downey; Sam Taylor; Holger Reibiger
- Starring: Stellan Skarsgård; Nina Hoss; Niels Arestrup
- Cinematography: Jérôme Alméras
- Edited by: Hervé Schneid
- Music by: Max Richter; Caoimhín Ó Raghallaigh; Thomas Bartlett
- Production companies: Gaumont; Volksfilm; Ziegler Film
- Distributed by: Wild Bunch
- Release date: 15 February 2017 (Berlin)
- Running time: 105 minutes
- Countries: Germany, France, Ireland
- Language: English
- Box office: $330,000

Return to Montauk (Rückkehr nach Montauk) is a 2017 German drama film directed by Volker Schlöndorff. It was selected to compete for the Golden Bear in the main competition section of the 67th Berlin International Film Festival.

== Plot ==
During a book tour in the United States, Max meets and falls in love with a young woman. Many years later, Max returns to the United States, hoping to reunite with his former lover during a weekend on Long Island in Montauk.

The plot is broadly inspired by Max Frisch's 1975 novel Montauk.

== Cast ==
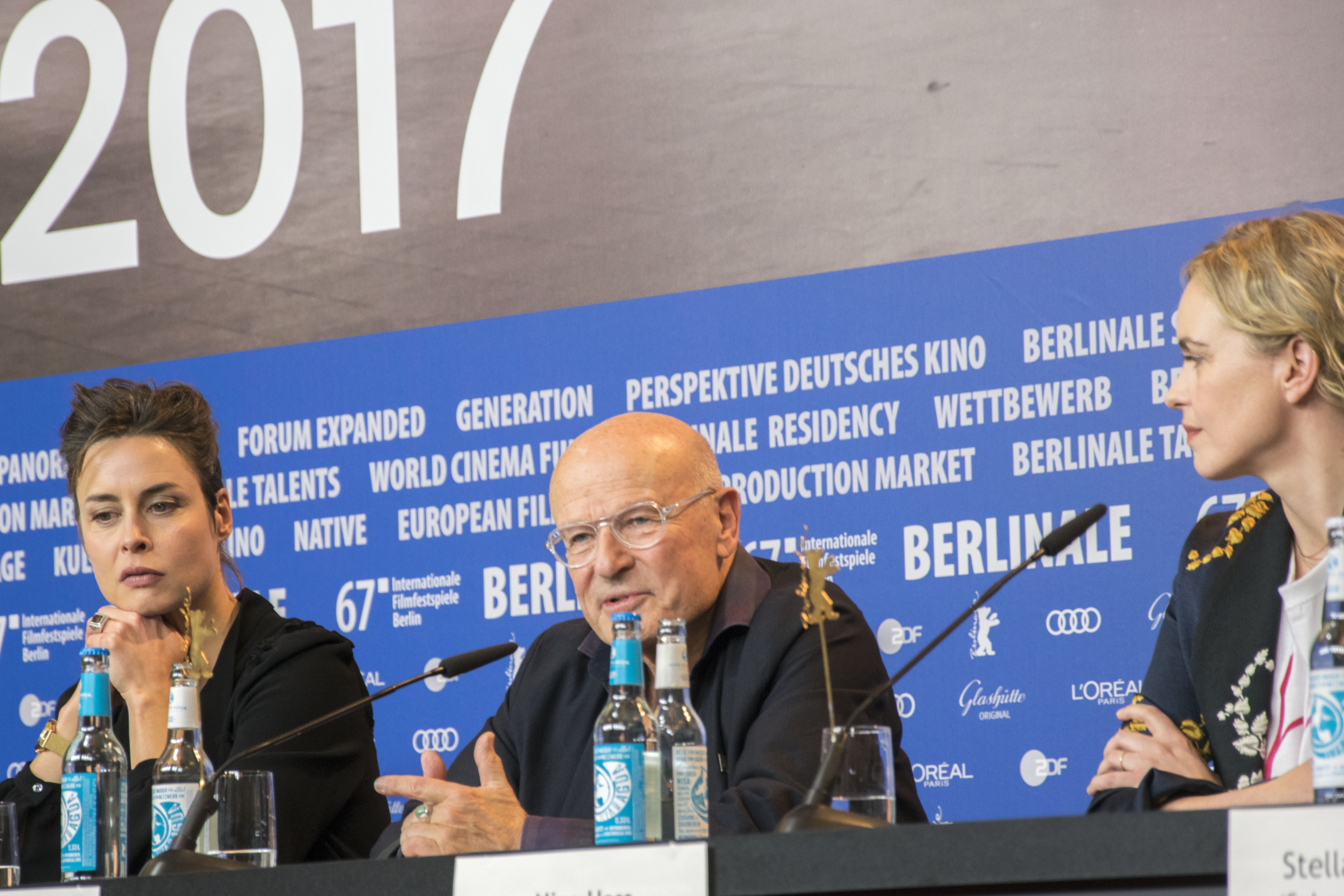
Wolff, Schlöndorff and Hoss at the 2017 Berlin Film Festival

- Stellan Skarsgård as Max Zorn
- Nina Hoss as Rebecca
- Niels Arestrup as Walter
- Susanne Wolff as Clara
- Bronagh Gallagher as Rachel
- Robert Seeliger as Jonathan
- Isioma Laborde-Edozien as Lindsey
- Paul Bonin as Wally
- Mathias Sanders as Mark McDonald
- Daniel Brunet as designer
- Ray Wiederhold as the doorman
- Olga Lezhneva as girl

== Production ==
The shooting started in New York City and Long Island in April 2016.

== Reception ==
Donald Clarke in The Irish Times, wrote that "this Colm Tóibín-assisted effort has none of the warmth of his best work".
