= The Testament of Mary =

Short novel by Colm Tóibín

- Author: Colm Tóibín
- Language: English
- Genre: Fiction
- Publisher: Scribner's
- Publication date: 13 November 2012
- Publication place: Ireland
- Media type: Print (hardcover)
- Pages: 96 pp (hardback)
- ISBN: 978-1451688382
- Preceded by: Brooklyn
- Followed by: Nora Webster

The Testament of Mary is a short novel by Irish writer Colm Tóibín. The book was published on 13 November 2012 by Scribner's.

The novel is written from the point of view of Mary, mother of Jesus, reflecting in her old age on her son's life and the claims he was a messiah.

== Plot ==
At an unspecified age, when Mary is close to death, she is regularly visited by followers of her son who wish to record her testament before she dies. However they are antagonistic towards Mary because they believe her son, Jesus, was a Messiah, a claim which she refuses to support.

Mary reflects that, like many young men, her son left their small town for opportunities in Jerusalem. Marcus, a cousin of hers, later visited her to reveal that her son was being closely watched by Roman and Jewish authorities after appearing to cure a man who could no longer walk; the cousin urged Mary to have Jesus return to live with her to save his life and not draw further ire.

In order to speak to Jesus, Mary travels to a nearby wedding where news that Jesus has resurrected Lazarus, a childhood friend, precedes his arrival. At the wedding Mary tries to convince Jesus to return to Nazareth but he ignores her. Some of the revellers later claim that Jesus turned water into wine but Mary questions their sobriety and did not personally witness this account. She later leaves in order to protect herself.

Marcus visits Mary again to tell her that her son has been arrested and will be crucified. Mary travels to the city with Mary, one of Lazarus' sisters, and one of her son's followers, who promises protection, in order to witness the event, still believing there is something she can do to save him. As she witnesses the violent crucifixion she spies Marcus and realizes he has lured her there to be arrested like the rest of her son's followers. Knowing they believe she will never abandon her son before he dies, Mary and the others flee anyway, thinking only of saving her life.

The three flee through the countryside and do desperate things in order to survive with Mary eventually losing all respect for her guide as she realizes he has no plan to save them. She also notices that she and Mary begin having the same dream in which a flood of water returns her now resurrected son to her. The trio eventually find safety and Mary, Lazarus's sister, departs to go home and live a normal life.

Jesus's followers attempt to convince Mary that her son was the son of God and to claim that she was there to see his resurrection which she disputes. When they tell her that her son died to save the world they are angered when she tells them it wasn't worth it.

No longer able to go to temple, Mary speaks to a replica of the statue of the goddess Artemis, confessing her hope that someday she will be dead.

== Reception ==
Initial critical reception for the book was positive, with a reviewer for the Irish Independent writing that "To say that this is a departure for the Wexford novelist is an understatement, but it can hardly fail to be a major talking point when it's published in October."

The Huffington Post also commented favourably on Tóibín's attempts to humanise Mary, saying: "The Testament of Mary is a reminder that Jesus indeed had a mother, and she was nobody's fool."

The book was criticized by some conservative Christians, who called it "blasphemous" content.

It was on the shortlist for the 2013 Man Booker Prize.

== Stage adaptation ==
The first version of the text was produced in 2011 by the Dublin Theatre Festival and Landmark Productions, as a one-woman play starring Marie Mullen, Testament. In January 2013, it was announced that Fiona Shaw would star in a Broadway stage adaptation of the play, titled The Testament of Mary, produced by Scott Rudin. Despite positive reviews and three Tony Award nominations (including a nomination for the prestigious Best Play), the production was closed on 5 May 2013 – almost a month and a half before its run was due to end – prompting Fintan O'Toole to comment: "I spent three years as a critic on Broadway, and I still can't claim to understand it. But this strange conjunction of apparent success and utter failure functions as a microcosm in which some of its oddities can be seen with a reasonable degree of clarity. If you can grasp why a producer would close a show in response to the news that it has just been nominated for three Tony Awards, you can get some sense of how Broadway works." United Solo awarded Shaw's performance with the special award at the 2013 festival.

== Translations ==
- Dutch: Het Testament van Maria. Translated by Anneke Bok. Overveen: World Editions NL. 23 September 2013. ISBN 9789462370289.
- Italian: Il testamento di Maria. Translated by Alberto Pezzotta. Milan: Bompiani. 3 January 2014. ISBN 9788845275548.
- Catalan: El testament de Maria. Translated by Maria Rosich Andreu. Barcelona: Amsterdam. 19 January 2014. ISBN 8492941995.
- Greek: Η διαθήκη της Μαρίας, romanized: I diathíki tis Marías. Translated by Athena Dimitriadou. Athens: Ikaros. 7 April 2014. ISBN 9789605720261.
- Romanian: RO Testamentul Mariei. Translated by Irina Bojin. Iași: Polirom. Mai, 2014 ISBN 9789734644452.
- Chinese: 馬利亞的泣訴; pinyin: Mǎlìyǎ de qìsù; lit. 'Mary's Cry'. Translated by Jing Xiang. Taipei: Reading Times. 2 January 2015. ISBN 9789571361215.
- French: Le testament de Marie. Translated by Anna Gibson. Paris: Robert Laffont. 20 August 2015. ISBN 9782221134900.
- Turkish: Meryem'in Tanıklığı. Translated by Handan Balkara Çevikus. Istanbul: Everest Yayınları. 6 July 2017. ISBN 9786051851693.
