= The Empty Family =

2010 collection of short stories by Colm Tóibín

- First edition cover
- Author: Colm Tóibín
- Language: English
- Genre: Short Story Collection
- Publisher: Scribner
- Publication date: 1 October 2010
- Publication place: Ireland
- Media type: Print (hardcover)
- Pages: 288 pp (hardback)
- ISBN: 978-1-4391-3832-8
- Preceded by: Brooklyn

The Empty Family is a collection of short stories by Irish writer Colm Tóibín. It was published in the UK in October 2010 and was released in the US in January 2011.

== Reception ==
The Empty Family was shortlisted for the 2011 Frank O'Connor International Short Story Award.

Bryan Lynch wrote in the Irish Independent that the "stories are always intensely interesting and sometimes profoundly provocative", noting that the sexually frank depictions required great courage. Keith Miller in The Daily Telegraph described the book as an "exquisite and almost excruciating collection". The Irish Times journalist Heather Ingman noted that most of Tóibín's familiar themes are present but with the addition of a "hard-won wisdom", giving rich rewards to the reader. Many reviewers commented on the fact that Tóibín's prose has become ever more spare and refined, with Ingman inviting readers "to read slowly and savour the silences between the words".
