= The Heather Blazing =

1992 novel by Colm Tóibín

- First paperback edition cover
- Author: Colm Tóibín.
- Language: English
- Genre: Novel
- Publisher: Picador
- Publication date: 11 September 1992
- Publication place: Ireland
- Media type: Print (Hardback & Paperback)
- Pages: 224 pp (first edition, hardback)
- ISBN: 0-330-32124-2 (first edition, hardback)
- OCLC: 26978348
- Dewey Decimal: 823/.914 20
- LC Class: PR6070.O455 H4 1992

The Heather Blazing is the 1992 novel by Irish writer Colm Tóibín. It was the writer's second novel and allowed him to become a full-time fiction writer. The intensity of the prose and the emotional tension under the colder eye with which the events are seen, provided him with a faithful readership both at home and abroad. It won the 1993 Encore Award for a second novel. The novel takes its title from a line from the song "Boolavogue", specifically "a rebel hand set the heather blazing".

== Plot summary ==
The novel tells the story of Eamon Redmond, a judge in the Irish High Court of the late twentieth century Ireland. It reconstructs his relationships with his wife and children through his life and the memories of a childhood marked by the death of his father. The County Wexford landscape and the death of the father are the narrative material, which Colm Tóibín would revisit again in The Blackwater Lightship. The novel also plots the development of Fianna Fáil from the austere republicanism and style of Éamon de Valera to the corruption of the Charles Haughey era.

== Reviews ==
Nicola Upson wrote in the Continuum Encyclopedia of British Literature, that the story of Eamon Redmond is "absorbing" and that it is a "beautiful portrayal of the little moments of everyday life as it is in its dealings with the bigger questions of sexual awakening, loss, and grief". She compared the novel to James Joyces Dubliners "in its treatment of childhood, adolescence, and maturity". In his review for Magill's Book Reviews, Mark McCloskey opines that Tóibín's "minimalist style complements Eamon Redmond's minimalist character". He argues that this style of writing though "tends to make every gesture and event in the novel equal — that is, somewhat flat".

Mark Harman wrote in the Los Angeles Times, that the author "tells this moving tale in such a deceptively straightforward manner that it would be easy to mistake the novel for a good read and nothing more than that ... yet the more one thinks about this clear-headed yet intense book, the stronger the impression it leaves". In her review for The Village Voice, Laurie Muchnick says it is a "beautifully written book, the prose fluid and never flashy, the structure perfectly suited to the story", and that she was surprised at its "subtle humor, and its awareness of small ironies". John Lanchester of The Guardian said that this novel has "peculiar resemblances" to John McGahern's book Amongst Women.
