= Brooklyn (film) =

2015 film directed by John Crowley

- British theatrical release poster
- Directed by: John Crowley
- Screenplay by: Nick Hornby
- Based on: Brooklyn by Colm Tóibín
- Produced by: Finola Dwyer; Amanda Posey
- Starring: Saoirse Ronan; Domhnall Gleeson; Emory Cohen; Jim Broadbent; Julie Walters
- Cinematography: Yves Bélanger
- Edited by: Jake Roberts
- Music by: Michael Brook
- Production companies: BBC Films; Telefilm Canada; Bord Scannán na hÉireann/the Irish Film Board; SODEC; BFI; Wildgaze Films; Finola Dwyer Productions; Parallel Films; Item 7; Ingenious; BAI; RTÉ; HanWay Films
- Distributed by: Lionsgate (United Kingdom and Ireland); Mongrel Media (Canada)
- Release dates: 26 January 2015 (Sundance); 6 November 2015 (United Kingdom and Ireland); 20 November 2015 (Canada)
- Running time: 112 minutes
- Countries: United Kingdom; Ireland; Canada
- Language: English
- Budget: $11 million
- Box office: $62.1 million

Brooklyn is a 2015 romantic period drama film directed by John Crowley and written by Nick Hornby, based on the 2009 novel by Colm Tóibín. It stars Saoirse Ronan in the lead role, with Emory Cohen, Domhnall Gleeson, Jim Broadbent, and Julie Walters in supporting roles. The plot follows Eilis Lacey, a young Irish woman who migrates to Brooklyn in the early 1950s to find employment. After building a life there, she is drawn back to her home town of Enniscorthy and has to choose where she wants to forge her future.

Principal photography began in April 2014 with three weeks of filming in Ireland, followed by four weeks in Montreal, Quebec. Only two days of filming took place in Brooklyn, one of which was spent at the beach in Coney Island. It was a co-production of the United Kingdom, Ireland, and Canada.

The film premiered on 26 January 2015 at the Sundance Film Festival, and was released in the United Kingdom and Ireland on 6 November, and Canada on 20 November. Critical response to the film was overwhelmingly positive, with many reviewers praising the performances of Ronan and Cohen. Ronan was nominated for numerous awards for Best Actress, including a BAFTA, Critics' Choice Award, Golden Globe, and Screen Actors Guild Award. The film won the BAFTA Award for Best British Film, and was nominated for three Academy Awards: Best Picture, Best Actress (for Ronan), and Best Adapted Screenplay. It was also featured on more than 120 film critics' "Top 10" lists of the best films of 2015, and was ranked 48th on the BBC's 2016 list of the 100 Greatest Films of the 21st Century.

== Plot ==
In 1951, in Enniscorthy, a small town in south-east Ireland, Eilis Lacey lives with her mother and older sister, Rose. Unable to find full-time employment, she works part-time for the spiteful Miss Kelly at her grocery shop. Eilis attends local dances with friend Nancy but is uninterested in the local men.

Rose arranges with Father Flood, an Irish priest in Brooklyn, for Eilis to immigrate to New York City for a better life. On the trip over, Eilis' cabinmate, Georgina, an experienced traveller returning to the US, offers advice and support.

In New York, Eilis lives in a Brooklyn boarding house, run by Mrs Kehoe, that caters to young immigrant Irish women. She finds a job at a department store but has difficulty adjusting to her new life. Father Flood enrolls Eilis in night school bookkeeping classes at Brooklyn College, as she wants to become an accountant.

At an Irish dance, Eilis meets Tony Fiorello, an Italian-American plumber. As their romance blossoms and she progresses in her studies, Eilis feels more at home in Brooklyn.

When Rose unexpectedly dies, Eilis tells Tony she must return home to help her mother. He shows her a plot of land on Long Island and says he and his brothers intend to build five houses on it, selling three and keeping one for their parents and one for him and Eilis, if she wants. She says she does but wants to visit her mother, so Tony asks her to marry him before she goes. Eilis reluctantly agrees, and they secretly marry at City Hall.

Once back in Ireland, Eilis makes no mention of her marriage. She temporarily takes Rose's bookkeeping job, which shows a promise of turning permanent. Nancy sets her up with a well-off bachelor, Jim Farrell. Eilis extends her stay to attend Nancy's wedding and avoids reading Tony's letters. Jim asks her to stay and indicates he would like to propose marriage. Eilis cares for Jim, but is noncommittal, unsure what future she wants and seemingly distances herself from her New York life.

Miss Kelly summons Eilis and issues a veiled threat that she knows Eilis is married. Remembering the stifling and restrictive life in Enniscorthy and fed up with Miss Kelly's bullying, Eilis states her full married name, establishing who she is and rendering Miss Kelly powerless over her. Eilis tearfully informs her mother that she is married and is returning to Brooklyn. She leaves Jim a farewell letter. On the ocean crossing back to New York, Eilis offers guidance to a young Irish woman making her first trip to America, mirroring Georgina's advice to her. Once home in Brooklyn, Eilis reunites with Tony and they embrace.

== Cast ==
- Saoirse Ronan as Eilis Lacey
- Domhnall Gleeson as Jim Farrell
- Emory Cohen as Tony Fiorello
- Jim Broadbent as Father Flood
- Julie Walters as Mrs Kehoe
- Jessica Paré as Miss Fortini
- Eve Macklin as Diana
- Bríd Brennan as Miss Kelly
- Fiona Glascott as Rose Lacey
- Jane Brennan as Mary Lacey
- Nora-Jane Noone as Sheila
- Jenn Murray as Dolores
- Eva Birthistle as Georgina
- Michael Zegen as Maurizio Fiorello
- Eileen O'Higgins as Nancy
- Peter Campion as George Sheridan
- Emily Bett Rickards as Patty McGuire
- Mary O'Driscoll as Miss McAdam
- Ellen David as Mrs Fiorello
- Christian de la Cortina as Laurenzio Fiorello
- Paulino Nunes as Mr Fiorello
- James DiGiacomo as Frankie Fiorello
- Karen Ardiff as Mrs Farrell
- Gary Lydon as Mr Farrell
- Mella Carron as Girl on Deck
- Áine Ní Mhuirí as Mrs Byrne

Colm Tóibín, the author of the novel upon which the film is based, has a cameo as the man in line in front of Eilis the first time she goes through immigration in New York.

== Production ==
=== Historical context ===
The film is set during a time when Irish migration to New York was thriving. The initial boom of Irish immigration to the US had started during the period following the Great Famine (1845–49). By the end of the Second World War, the rate of Irish migration to New York had declined, but new migrants were still able to find bustling Irish communities in which women were arguably a more significant presence than men. These women migrants were often active in the workplace, postponing marriage to find practical occupations in places such as supermarkets, eateries, and stores. Eilis makes her journey from Ireland to America in the 1950s, along with approximately 50,000 other migrants (around a quarter of whom moved to New York) as a part of the second minor wave of migration. Many of these migrants were in search of steadier jobs and a happier life. There were also smaller surges of migrants from many other countries at this time, expanding the trend of modern America becoming a vast land of different cultures.

=== Adaptation ===
Brooklyn is adapted from Irish writer Colm Tóibín's 2009 novel of the same name. The novel has been much-celebrated in the literary world, with The Observer naming it as one of "The 10 best historical novels" in 2012. In addition to this, it won the 2009 Costa Novel Award, was shortlisted for the 2011 International Dublin Literary Award, and was longlisted for the 2009 Booker Prize.

The film is generally regarded as a faithful adaptation of the novel, with Tóibín noting the overall "authenticity" of the film in an interview with The Washington Post. The two works differ notably in how they end: in the novel, Eilis leaves Ireland, but her destination and ultimately her fate is left for the reader to decide, while the film ends with Eilis having a poignant reunion with Tony in Brooklyn. In Tóibín's later novel, Nora Webster, set in the 1960s, the author offers a glimpse of Eilis's later life during a conversation between that story's main character and Eilis's mother. The book and film have been praised for their refreshing perspective on the plight of the Irish migrant.

=== Principal photography ===
Principal photography began on 1 April 2014 in Ireland. The three weeks of filming in the country took place at locations in Enniscorthy, Wexford, and Dublin. On the first day of shooting, Ronan was spotted in period costume on the set in Enniscorthy. Production then moved to Montreal, Quebec, for four more weeks of filming. Two days were spent shooting in Brooklyn, one day of which was spent at the beach in Coney Island.

== Release ==
Brooklyn premiered at the Sundance Film Festival on 26 January 2015. Shortly after, a bidding war ensued, which included Fox Searchlight Pictures, Focus Features, Lionsgate, Roadside Attractions, CBS Films and The Weinstein Company. Fox Searchlight acquired distribution rights for the United States and some foreign territories for $9 million, which was one of the biggest deals to ever come out of Sundance at the time. Brooklyn was selected to be shown as part of the Special Presentations section of the 2015 Toronto International Film Festival, where it was screened on 13 September.

In the United States, the film opened in limited release on 4 November 2015, before opening wide on 25 November. It was released by Lionsgate in the UK and Ireland on 6 November. In Canada, it was given a limited release by Mongrel Media in Toronto and Vancouver on 20 November, before opening nationwide on 11 December.

== Reception ==
=== Critical response ===
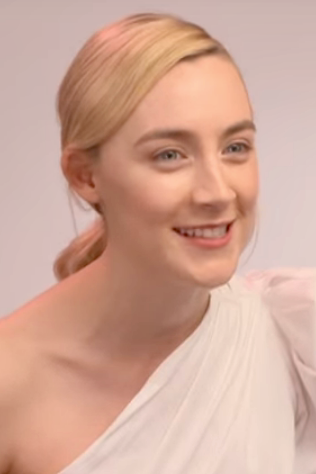
Saoirse Ronan's performance garnered critical acclaim, earning her a nomination for the Academy Award for Best Actress.

On the review aggregator website Rotten Tomatoes, 97% of 279 critics' reviews are positive, with an average rating of 8.5/10. The website's consensus reads: "Brooklyn buttresses outstanding performances from Saoirse Ronan and Emory Cohen with a rich period drama that tugs at the heartstrings as deftly as it satisfies the mind." Metacritic, which uses a weighted average, assigned the film a score of 88 out of 100, based on 45 critics, indicating "universal acclaim". Audiences polled by PostTrak gave the film an overall positive score of 92%, and over 80% of respondents said they would "definitely recommend" it.

Brooklyn received a standing ovation following its premiere at the 2015 Sundance Film Festival. The British Film Institute called the film one of the best releases of 2015. In his review for the organization, Philip Kemp, describing ambiance and tone of the film, stated: "In some ways Brooklyn feels like a movie that's not just about, but also from, a more innocent age." He also pointed out that, while most immigrant stories are "male-led", Brooklyn is "female-led and all the stronger for it", concluding that "In this, as in most other ways, it's faithful to its source material."

Donald Clarke of The Irish Times gave the film 4 out of 5 stars, noting that "Brooklyn is a most unconventional conventional romance." Clarke also wrote, "The film ultimately encounters the sort of near-accidental knot of deception that powered restoration comedies." Peter Bradshaw of The Guardian gave the film 4 out of 5 stars, calling it "a very heartfelt and absorbing film." Bradshaw highlighted Ronan's lead performance, stating that she "is the heart and point of this film" and "gives such a tremendous performance." A. O. Scott of The New York Times described the film as "an old photograph without a frame, an implied flashback" and wrote, "Brooklyn endows its characters with desires and aspirations, but not with foresight, and it examines the past with open-minded curiosity rather than with sentimentality or easy judgment." Scott also praised Ronan's performance, commenting that she "uses everything — her posture, her eyebrows, her breath, her teeth, her pores — to convey a process of change that is both seismic and subtle."

In 2024, Looper ranked it number 45 on its list of the "50 Best PG-13 Movies of All Time," writing "The charming performances and amiable aesthetic of the entire production, all overseen by director John Crowley, make this the kind of low-key treat that's, much like most other movies Ronan's appeared in, impossible to resist."

=== Box office ===
Brooklyn grossed $38.3 million in North America and $23.7 million in other territories, for a worldwide total of $62.1 million, against a budget of $11 million. The Hollywood Reporter calculated that the film made a net profit of $3–4 million.

The film's gross in Canada exceeded C$4 million, giving it the highest cumulative domestic gross of any Canadian film released in 2015. In Ireland, it earned over $650,000 from 87 cinemas its opening weekend, which was the biggest opening of any Irish drama in Ireland since Michael Collins opened to $662,000 in November 1996.

=== Accolades ===
The film won the Audience Favorite Gold Award in World Cinema at the Mill Valley Film Festival, the Rogers People's Choice Award at the Vancouver International Film Festival, and the Audience Award for Best Narrative Feature at the Virginia Film Festival. Emory Cohen was named Breakthrough Performer at the Hamptons International Film Festival.

Brooklyn received many nominations for industry and critics awards, including three nominations at the 88th Academy Awards: Best Picture, Best Adapted Screenplay, and Best Actress. Saoirse Ronan's performance was particularly praised, and, in addition to her Oscar nod, she garnered BAFTA, Critics' Choice, Golden Globe, and SAG nominations for Best Actress. She also won the BIFA for Best Performance by an Actress in a British Independent Film. Julie Walters was nominated for Best Supporting Actress at the BAFTAs. The film won the Canadian Screen Awards for Best Cinematography and Best Musical Score and the Quebec Cinema Awards (formerly known as the Prix Jutra) for Best Cinematography and Best Art Direction.

The film was also featured on more than 120 film critics' "Top 10" lists of the best films of 2015, and was ranked 48th on the BBC's 2016 list of the 100 Greatest Films of the 21st Century. It is ranked as the fourth-best reviewed film of 2015 on Rotten Tomatoes and as fifth-best on Metacritic.
