= The Magician (Tóibín novel) =

2021 novel by Colm Tóibín

- First edition cover
- Author: Colm Tóibín
- Language: English
- Genre: Biographical novel
- Publisher: Scribner
- Publication date: 7 September 2021
- Publication place: New York
- Pages: 498
- ISBN: 9781476785080

The Magician, published in 2021, is a novel by Colm Tóibín. It is a fictional biography of German Nobel laureate Thomas Mann.

== Reception ==
In a review for The New York Times, writer Jay Parini assessed The Magician as a "work of huge imaginative sympathy" and praised its "expansive and subtle rhythms" as satisfying and elegant.

Lucy Hughes-Hallett of The Guardian recognised the work as "enormously ambitious" and felt Tóibín "exquisitely balanced" the private and public facets of Mann's life. Hughes-Hallet reserved special praise for Tóibín's "chilling account of his conversation with the financier and newspaper proprietor Eugene Meyer".
