= David Cohen Prize =

British literary award

The David Cohen Prize for Literature (est. 1993) is a biennial British literary award given to a writer, novelist, short-story writer, poet, essayist or dramatist in recognition of an entire body of work, written in the English language. The prize is funded by the John S. Cohen Foundation and administered by Arts Council England. The writer must be a British or Irish citizen. The winner is chosen by nomination and entries are not required. The prize is valued at £40,000.

In 2005, the David Cohen Prize incorporated the Clarissa Luard Award. The winner of the David Cohen Prize chooses the recipient of the Clarissa Luard Award, valued at £12,500 (funded by the Arts Council of England), and given to a writer under the age of 35 or an organisation that supports young writers. In 2017, Arts Council England launched the Clarissa Luard Award for Independent Publishing, managed by New Writing North, to recognise and celebrate the "adventurousness, innovative spirit and creativity" of independent literary publishing in the UK and Ireland.

== List of recipients ==
- 1993: V. S. Naipaul
- 1995: Harold Pinter
- 1997: Muriel Spark
- 1999: William Trevor
- 2001: Doris Lessing
- 2003: Beryl Bainbridge and Thom Gunn (joint winners)
- 2005: Michael Holroyd
- 2007: Derek Mahon
- 2009: Seamus Heaney
- 2011: Julian Barnes
- 2013: Hilary Mantel
- 2015: Tony Harrison
- 2017: Tom Stoppard
- 2019: Edna O'Brien
- 2021: Colm Tóibín
- 2023: John Burnside
- 2025: Alan Hollinghurst
