= The Master (novel) =

2004 novel by Colm Tóibín

- Book cover of the original hardback English edition
- Author: Colm Tóibín
- Language: English
- Genre: Novel
- Publisher: Picador
- Publication date: 2004
- Publication place: Ireland
- Media type: Print (Hardback & Paperback)
- ISBN: 0-330-43788-7 (hardback edition)

The Master is a novel by Irish writer Colm Tóibín. His fifth novel, it received the International Dublin Literary Award, the Stonewall Book Award, the Lambda Literary Award, the Los Angeles Times Novel of the Year and, in France, Le prix du meilleur livre étranger in 2005. It was also shortlisted for the 2004 Booker Prize.

== Plot summary ==
The Master depicts the American-born writer Henry James in the final years of the 19th century. The eleven chapters of the novel are labelled from January 1895 to October 1899 and follow the writer from his failure in the London theatre, with the play Guy Domville, to his seclusion in the town of Rye, East Sussex, where in the following years he rapidly produced several masterpieces.

The novel starts with a portrait of Henry as a public figure who feels humiliated in an unexpected way, not just in the public side of his writing career but also in a more personal way, in which all the precautions he had taken to carry on with his life as he wished it to be, come to a crisis. Henry resolves to reduce his public life by buying a house in Rye and there he nurses his loneliness and is haunted by all the consequences his need to maintain a protected space in which to live and write has generated all through his life. He's in his fifties and he's very much aware of how he had to refuse the company of his ill sister, whom he adored, at some point, how he chose to stay away from his country and his family, how he felt to turn cold with a writer friend he had been very close to previously and becomes a bachelor with an unresolved sexuality, certainly close to homosexuality, living in a house with servants in the South of England and a daily visit of the stenographer to whom he dictates. The portrait of Henry, a man appalled by the Oscar Wilde case while repressing his self and his sexuality, shows a complex and ambiguous man. He copes with life by exerting control over how much he would reveal, even to himself, and choosing to be a writer in order to achieve precisely that.

== Background ==
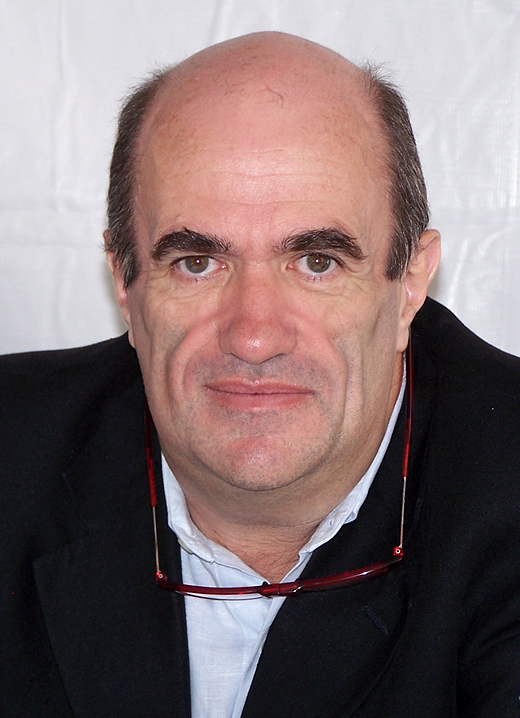
Author: Colm Tóibín

During his acceptance of the 2011 Irish PEN Award, Colm Tóibín was lauded as a "Champion of minorities". To find himself the recipient of such praise was hardly a likely outcome when one considers the conservative rural background that he emerged from, saying of his youth spent in his family home that it was characterised by "a great deal of silence". Tóibín chose to first address his own homosexuality, with no great deal of ceremony, in his essay “New Ways of Killing Your Father” published in November 1993 for London Review of Books. This development must be read against the cultural climate of the time. David Norris (politician) had, at this stage, successfully lobbied the European Court of Human Rights to declare a ruling that the antigay laws in Ireland were a flagrant transgression of the European Convention on Human Rights. Such a ruling had resulted in the passing of a bill by Dáil Éireann in June 1993 that decriminalised homosexuality in Ireland. This is the context that Tóibín, as a gay writer, was emerging from, one of transition and burgeoning reclamation of a lost gay identity. This reclamation is best captured by the critic Jennifer M. Jeffers when she says 'Irish novels in the last decade of the twentieth century push the heterosexual culture to see its “inbuilt” gender identifications, needless to say, this is not a comfortable or easy process. Irish religious, gender, sexual and material precedents in fiction that overtly challenge heterosexual culture and regulation are basically nonexistent'. Thus, Tóibín's creative output - post 1993, increasingly explores themes of homosexuality in such a way that parallels his 'increasingly public self-identification as gay'.

== Main characters ==
- Henry James – Protagonist and focus of the novel's narrative.
- Alice James – Neurotic, invalid sister of Henry James.
- William James – Henry's overbearing older brother.
- Wilkie James – Henry's younger brother, brutally injured during the American Civil War.
- Minnie Temple – Effervescent young cousin of Henry James who was the recipient of much affection from the young Henry.
- Constance Fenimore Woolson – Shared a complex friendship with Henry. Her non-platonic attraction to him going unreciprocated.
- Oliver Wendell Holmes Jr. – A college friend who James vacationed with.
- Paul Joukowsky – Artist residing in Paris with whom the young James experienced a close friendship.
- Corporal Hammond – Manservant assigned to Henry during his stay in Ireland, who seemingly offers an unspoken sexual encounter with the writer.
- Hendrik Christian Andersen – An opportunistic sculptor who takes advantage of an older James in order to help forward his own career. Resided in Lamb House with James for a time.

== Reception ==
American writer John Updike described the book in The New Yorker (2004-06-28): “Tóibín's subject is the inward James, the master of literary creation and a vast hushed arena of dreams and memories and hoarded observations”. Daniel Mendelsohn in the New York Review of Books also praised the book, referring to it as "unquestionably the work of a first-rate novelist – one who has for the past decade been writing excellent novels about people cut off from their feelings or families or both."

An appraisal in Esquire said that "In The Master, [Toibin] brings James to life in a way that no straight biography could."

U.S. writer Cynthia Ozick said Tóibín's "rendering of the first hints, or sensations, of the tales as they form in James's thoughts is itself an instance of writer's wizardry".

== Composition ==
Colm Tóibín chose to write The Master in much the same conditions as his previous novels – implementing an uncomfortable work environment to generate a very specific work ethic. That includes a hard, uncomfortable chair and choosing to write his drafts by hand rather than with the help of modern technologies like a computer.

The impetus for the novel's composition first came from his collection of essays entitled Love in a Dark Time: Gay Lives from Wilde to Almodóvar (2002), in which an opportunity was taken for deeper rumination on the sexual identity of queer authors. In light of this study, Tóibín began to understand the dramatic potential for Henry James's conflict between his interior and exterior self. However, Tóibín is often keen to point out also that The Master is not simply an exploration of James's sexuality, “I really wasn't that interested in his homosexuality other than what it offered me as a drama of renunciation.”

== Style ==
The Master is written in the genre of historical fiction and in a third person narrative that emphasises the intimate inner monologue of Henry James, a style of writing that The Telegraph (London)'s Benjamin Markovits refers to as 'Tóibín's speciality'. Markovits chooses to draw a direct line between Tóibín's prose and that of the man he is depicting in virtue of their shared lucidity and precision of language, 'so fine it can render the slightest variation in mood or circumstance'.

Furthermore, Tóibín's emphasis on memory and recollection is such that when coupled with James's expertly realised interiority, the reader constantly finds themselves transported with James's consciousness back to the events of the memories he recalls. Tóibín, in doing so takes us beyond the temporal constriction of the four years that the novel takes place during.

== Sexuality ==
Tóibín provides a detailed exploration of the sexual identity of Henry James as found within The Master. Leon Edel is considered one on the most significant biographers of Henry James and within his seminal five-volume biography he chooses to present James as a wholly celibate individual, a stance that has been commonplace since it was first put forward by critic Saul Rosenzweig in 1943. The publishing of Henry James: The Young Master by Sheldon M. Novick in 2004 was one of the first significant challenges to this well-established approach to Jamesian scholarship. This pivot in critical approach was born from an increasing number of James's correspondence to young men coming to light in virtue of their sometimes veiled (sometimes not) eroticism. Tóibín chooses to follow the same tack as Novick within The Master through his exploration of the Closeted Victorian.

== Irish identity ==
Tóibín's approach to national identity within this novel appears as a proliferation of his response to The Essential Hemingway and indeed foregrounds Tóibín's attraction to James in the first place; “the amount of emotion living in what was not said, what was between the words and the sentences.". This point is further clarified by Tóibín himself within his collection of essays All a Novelist Needs when he notes that 'In dealing with James's attitude towards Ireland ... and indeed towards his homosexuality, it is important to remember that he was in both instances non-practicing.' (14).

== Awards and nominations ==
The Master received the 2004 Los Angeles Times Novel of the Year award and was shortlisted for the 2004 Booker Prize. It received the 2005 Lambda Literary Award, the 2005 Stonewall Book Award, France's 2005 Le prix du Meilleur livre étranger (Best Foreign Book Prize) and the 2006 International Dublin Literary Award.
