= The Sign of the Cross (book) =

Book by Colm Tóibín

- Author: Colm Tóibín
- Genre: Non Fiction
- Publication date: 1994
- ISBN: 978-0330373579

The Sign of the Cross: Travels in Catholic Europe is a non-fiction book published in 1994 by Irish writer Colm Tóibín.

In the book, Tóibín describes successive Holy Weeks spent in Poland, Seville, Bavaria, Rome, and the Balkans and reflects on the condition of Catholicism in every place making it an intellectual survey of the state of the faith in the new Europe of the 1990s. He also visits post-Communist Catholic Lithuania and Estonia and considers the faith in Ireland and Scotland.

Tóibín, a Catholic by baptism, reckons with the religious demons of his past, the rituals, the pilgrimages, and the shrines. A special chapter is devoted to Toibin's strange and painful session in group therapy, wherein, to his surprise, he experiences the urge to make the sign of the cross in memory of his father, who died when he was a boy. His father's death is also present in some of his novels.

The book was shortlisted for the Waterstone's / Volvo / Esquire Prize for the Best Non-Fiction Book of the Year, 1994.
