= Love in a Dark Time =

2002 collection of essays by Colm Tóibín

Love In a Dark Time: Gay Lives from Wilde to Almodóvar
- Author: Colm Tóibín
- Language: English
- Genre: Essay collection
- Publication date: 2002
- Publication place: United Kingdom

Love In a Dark Time: Gay Lives from Wilde to Almodóvar is a collection of essays by Irish writer Colm Tóibín published in 2002.

The first essay was a long review, published originally in the London Review of Books, on A History of Gay Literature: The Male Tradition by Gregory Woods.

"Writing these pieces", said Tóibín, "helped me to come to terms with things - with my own interest in secret, erotic energy (Roger Casement and Thomas Mann), my pure admiration for figures who, unlike myself, weren't afraid (Oscar Wilde, Bacon, Almodóvar), my abiding fascination with sadness (Elizabeth Bishop, James Baldwin) and, indeed, tragedy (Thom Gunn and Mark Doty)." The book also contains an essay on Henry James, a figure to whom the author would later devote a novel, The Master.
