= Mothers and Sons (book) =

2006 short story collection by Colm Tóibín

- First edition cover
- Author: Colm Tóibín
- Language: English
- Genre: Novel
- Publisher: Picador
- Publication date: 2006
- Publication place: Ireland
- Media type: Print (hardcover)
- Pages: 256
- ISBN: 0-330-44182-5
- OCLC: 75964519
- Dewey Decimal: 823/.914 22
- LC Class: PR6070.O455 M68 2006

Mothers and Sons is a 2006 collection of short stories written by Irish writer Colm Tóibín and published in 2006. The book was published in hardback by Picador, and each of its stories explores an aspect of the mother-son relationship. All take place in contemporary Ireland, except that the last and longest, "A Long Winter", takes place in Catalonia perhaps twenty years after the Spanish Civil War.

== Stories ==
The stories in the collection are as follows:

"The Use of Reason"

A criminal considers an offer to buy a Rembrandt painting that he stole. He also learns that his mother has been talking indiscreetly to an undercover Guard (police officer). Like most of the viewpoint characters in the book, he reflects at length on his past.

"A Song"

A young musician finds himself in the audience for a performance by his mother, a famous singer whom he hasn't seen since he was a small child.

"The Name of the Game"

A woman converts her late husband's failing store into an off-licence and chip shop, earning the enmity of many her neighbours. Her teenaged son becomes adept at managing the shop, to the detriment of his social life and education.

"Famous Blue Raincoat"

A woman's son becomes interested in the folk-rock records she and her sister made in their youth, bringing up painful memories of her sister's death.

"A Priest in the Family"

An elderly woman finds out that her son, a priest, is charged with sexually abusing boys. It was published in the London Review of Books in May 2004.

"A Journey"

A woman whose husband is gravely ill takes her son home from the hospital where he has been treated for depression.

"Three Friends"

A young man, after his mother's death, has his first homosexual experience.

"A Summer Job"

A woman watches her son grow up distant from her but his grandmother's favourite until his relationship with his grandmother comes into conflict with his ambition to play hurling.

"A Long Winter"

A young man's mother leaves him and his father when his father cuts off the supply of wine, which she's addicted to. She disappears, presumably caught by a snowstorm in the mountains while walking to her native village. The father and son are saved from a decline when they hire an orphaned young man to do traditional woman's work. The two orphans' friendship appears to be leading to a sexual relationship.

Some of the stories in Mothers and Sons, like other Tóibín fiction, explore homosexuality in Ireland. In addition to mother-son relationships, Tóibín considers gayness alongside Catholicism, and how the two can be compatible in an Irish context.

Most of the stories appeared in print prior to the book's publication in popular literary periodicals such as The Guardian, The London Review of Books, and The Dublin Review.

Tóibín has spoken about the economic disparity between short story collections and novels, the former being unlikely to fetch as much popular interest, or, therefore, money, which is the reason (or so he says) he writes in the first place.

== Reception ==
Sally Vickers, writing for The London Times says that her main complaint is not directed "at the writing, which is [appropriately] stark, but at the starkness of a world view that finds few redeeming features in the complex business of being alive.
