= The South (Tóibín novel) =

1990 novel by Colm Tóibín

- First edition (UK)
- Author: Colm Tóibín
- Language: English
- Series: 90s
- Genre: Novel
- Publisher: Serpent's Tail
- Publication date: 1990
- Publication place: Ireland
- Media type: Print (Paperback)
- Pages: 238
- ISBN: 978-1-85242-170-0
- OCLC: 475726865
- LC Class: PR6070.O455 S68 1990

The South is a 1990 novel by Irish writer Colm Tóibín.

== Plot summary ==
Katherine Proctor, a Protestant woman of 32 from Ireland, arrives in Barcelona in 1950 having left her husband Tom, their 10-year-old son Richard, the large landed property they own, and Ireland. She repeats what her own mother did, leave her husband and child. She leaves the home her father built as she fears reprisals (a mob having previously set fire to their home some years ago) because her husband was too harsh with their Catholic neighbours.

She starts discovering the city of Barcelona and gets to meet local painters. The Francoist State and the still recent civil war define life in Spain. She meets the artist Miguel, a man who fought in that Civil War. She meets Michael Graves, an Irishman from her same town, also in Barcelona. He loved Katherine. Acquainted with a group of painters, Katherine begins to paint, taking lessons and trying her hand. She is a passionate painter, similar to Miguel, and unlike Michael, who paints what will sell.

After becoming lovers with Miguel, the two move to a remote village in the Pyrenees, where Miguel fought in the Civil War.

In 1957, Katherine briefly returns to Dublin to try reconciling with Tom, and announces that she is pregnant with Miguel's child.

== Edition changes ==
The endings of the hardback and paperback editions differ. Tóibín altered two sentences of the book's ending because he thought it was too soft. He said in 2021: "There was one moment where it looked like they were going to be happy forever. What I had was slightly too sugary."

== Development ==
The idea for The South came to Tóibín in 1982 whilst on a train from Dublin to his native town of Enniscorthy. He observed a fellow passenger, a well-dressed woman "rich—not gaudy rich, but old rich", whom he took to be a Protestant. She continued to figure in his mind.

He spent three years working on the novel, by night and at the weekend.

== Publication ==
The novel was first published by Serpent's Tail in 1990 and a revised edition was published by Picador Press. ISBN 0-330-33985-0.

Viking Penguin secured the U.S. publication rights.

== Reception ==
Tóibín showed the completed manuscript to Fintan O'Toole, who was a colleague at the time, as Tóibín was a journalist in Dublin when he wrote this novel. O'Toole later said he was "just staggered": "It was obvious from the first twenty pages Colm was an artist."

Tóibín's view on The South decades later was: "If you look at it, you see that the sentence structure is more or less taken from Didion."

Thomas O'Dwyer writing in The Jerusalem Post drew comparisons with the work of Milan Kundera the Czech-French author, remarking that "the power of emotion and events is so piercing" in this first novel by Tóibín.

"Spare, grave and finely articulated" is how Richard Eder described this novel, adding that it is "terribly abstract". The story interweaves the Spanish Civil War and the Irish Troubles, two harsh events in the past of Katherine and her lover, perhaps suggesting reconciliation by the end of the novel.

The Washington Post's Barbara Probst Solomon referred to "the tremendous amount Tóibín leaves unsaid".

Kirkus Reviews noted the spare prose in this first novel by the author, a promising debut.

== Awards and nominations ==
The South won the Irish Times / Aer Lingus First Fiction Award in 1990.
