= The Story of the Night =

Bildungsroman by Colm Tóibín

- Paperback edition book cover
- Author: Colm Tóibín
- Language: English
- Genre: Novel
- Published: 1996 (Picador)
- Publication date: 27 September 1996
- Publication place: Ireland
- Media type: Print (Hardback & Paperback)
- Pages: 312 pp
- ISBN: 0-330-34017-4 (hardback edition) & ISBN 0-330-34018-2 (paperback edition)
- OCLC: 36712956
- Dewey Decimal: 823/.914 21
- LC Class: PR6070.O455 S76 1996

The Story of the Night is a bildungsroman by Irish novelist Colm Tóibín. The novel interweaves the personal story of Richard Garay, a gay Argentinian man with an English mother, and the political history of Argentina through the late 1970s, 1980s and early 1990s.

Told entirely in the first person, the novel presents a wholly convincing picture of a character who could almost be described as an anti-hero, and who distills not just the Argentinian but the global late 20th century mix of sexual and economic "freedoms" in a single life: a "story of the night" lights otherwise shadowy places.

Toibín's third novel, it was his first to feature a gay character.

== Plot ==
The novel is split into three parts across various settings in Argentina and in Barcelona, and takes place in both domestic and public spaces.

Part One

The Story of the Night opens with a discussion of Richard's mother – her patriotism towards England before her death, and how Richard imagines she would have responded to the Falklands War. Richard experienced a lack of political awareness before the war when the generals were in power, but he recalls one time he was having sex with a dark-haired man and heard a revving sound outside. When Richard asked his partner what the noise was, he responded that the police station opposite were using a car to power cattle rods for torture.

Richard attends university during the Dirty War. He befriends Jorge Canetto, the (straight) son of a wealthy family; he teaches Jorge English and develops a crush on him. He eventually confesses to Jorge that he is gay, much to Jorge's disapproval. One evening, his mother asks him if Jorge is gay and Richard, surprised, reveals his homosexuality to his mother.

The novel then flashes back to Richard's childhood. His mother's family immigrated from England to Argentina when she was a child and, as a result, Richard himself felt he was English growing up. After his father's death, he and his mother were left without funds. Richard's aunts and uncles on his father's side were stingy, and provided little money. His mother decided they would stay with her sister (Aunt Matilda) in Molino, but they soon discover that Matilda and her family are very poor. They are put up in a shed by Matilda's tiny cottage. In the following days, Richard's cousin takes him to play with other boys who live on the estate. Three of these boys take Richard to a barn where they all disrobe and masturbate together. Richard develops a crush on one of the boys (Juan), but discovers that there are rules to this "game" after Juan calls him "queer" for trying to kiss him. Eventually his Uncle and mother fall out, and so Richard and his mother move back to Buenos Aires. Back at home his mother finds a job working in a "very refined" hotel, and is given some money by the English community in Buenos Aires to tide her over.

Back in the present-day, Richard attends university and his mother works in the hotel. Jorge invites Richard on a three-week visit to Barcelona, a friend of Jorge's had pulled out at the last minute. Whilst there, the two meet up with a group of young Chilean refugees from the Pinochet regime. Elena, one of the two Chilean girls, attaches herself to Jorge, but Jorge prefers the other girl, Maria Jose. Nonetheless, Jorge has sex with Elena every night. As Jorge and Richard are sharing a room, Jorge makes Richard pretend to be asleep whilst they are in the bed next to him.

It is revealed that two or three of the Chileans had been arrested and Raul, who had not been very political, had been tortured. Jorge sleeps with Maria Jose and then leaves Barcelona with her for a while. Richard continues to spend time with the Chileans and develops a crush on Raul. Elena gives Richard details about Raul's torture. She says that soon their group will be dispersed and they will have to settle in different places. Jorge and Maria Jose return and spend time alone away from the rest of the group. When it is time for Jorge and Richard to leave, Jorge gives the Chileans a fake address, in case they are arrested again. Jorge is afraid of what might happen if his address was found on them. Richard gives them his real address. They say goodbye and Richard and Jorge return to Argentina.

Richard's mother seems much older and frailer than she did before he left for Spain. She begins to hate Argentina and wishes her father had stayed in England. She eventually becomes too incapacitated to work and so Richard gets a job teaching English. She has a stroke and loses her ability to speak. After a while she dies.

Richard is emotionally numb for months after her death, but eventually begins to feel sexual desire again. He brings a man he met in the street back to his apartment. He starts to go to a sauna twice a week to meet other gay men.

Argentina takes hold of the Malvinas. People treat Richard with a little suspicion due to his being half English, but Richard wholeheartedly supports Argentina.

Jorge's father, Senor Canetto, invites Richard to their house for dinner. There are a number of middle-aged army men in attendance, all of whom are Peronists. As negotiations fail and the Falkland war breaks out, Richard often goes to the Canetto's for dinner and to discuss politics and the war. The men at these dinners are certain that Argentina will win but Richard is sceptical. Richard feels a great sense of shame for his country when Britain wins the war. Richard is at these dinners when important political changes happen; when Alfonsin is elected president, when the generals are put on trial etc. Richard discovers that Canetto has political ambitions, and hopes for American funding. Canetto invites Richard to meet some American diplomats. These Americans are hosting receptions and need someone who can talk to them about democratic possibilities, and who can speak both Spanish and English.

Part 2

He goes to a party where he meets these American diplomats; Susan and Donal Ford. Initially he represents Canetto's interests, Canetto plans to run for president and needs someone who speaks English to convince the diplomats to fund him. Richard finds that he changes into someone new, someone more confident and assured when he talks to them. After this party he meets with Susan privately where they talk intimately; Richard tells her about his parents deaths and his relationship with his father. He goes to dinner with Susan and Donald where they talk politics. Richard says he thinks Argentinians are more concerned with issues like economics, employment and welfare than they are about people disappearing. The three of them begin having drinks and dinner often. They talk about informal things and relax together.

Richard begins to hate his teaching job. One day he goes to the sauna and seduces a young man, but this seduction takes a long time so Richard decides not to go to work that day. He and the man have sex, and then Richard goes to a movie alone during his evening classes. He tells the Ford's how he despises his job and Susan offers him a new job looking after a group of American economists. The economists are coming to Argentina to suggest ways the country can reduce spending so that they can pay debts. Richard does not go back to his teaching job, after two weeks he is given a cheque and a letter of dismissal. He stays in a hotel with the economists and works with them well.

Donald talks to Richard about a potential job working towards the privatisation of the oil industry. Whilst at a dinner with the economists, Richard talks to a friend from university who had also been working with the economists. Richard had been discussing with the Americans how he did not know anyone who had disappeared and that the disappearances were not important to his life. His friend from university talks about his girlfriend who he is certain was murdered when she disappeared.

Richard returns to his apartment and finds letters from Jorge. Senor Canetto is exasperated and impatient to know whether the Americans will fund him. He meets with Susan and shows her these letters. She suggests that Canetto have a fund-raising party which they will attend to get to know him. She tells him more about the work he will do in the Oil industry. Richard goes to the Canetto's house to tell them Susan's suggestion and he meets Jorge's brother Pablo for the first time Jorge sets up a tennis game – he and Pablo play against Richard and Donald.

Donald and Richard begin playing tennis privately. After one game Donald puts his arms around Richard whilst they are both naked and tries to lift him up. When Donald sees that Richard has an erection his suspicion that Richard is gay is confirmed.

The Canettos throw their party, but Donald and Susan are unimpressed.

Richard decides to go to a new sauna – it is Sunday and his usual one is closed. The new sauna is dingy, with a smell of rot and gay porn playing on a TV. In the changing rooms he runs into Pablo. Richard is desperate to talk to him, but cannot find him after Pablo disappears into the Sauna.

Donald and Susan convince Richard to rent an office and become an independent consultant and translator. An oil tycoon, Frederico Arenas, offers Richard a job involving the "transport" of some goods, saying that no-one would question if these goods were called "oil" and transported as oil. Richard refuses his contract.

Susan invites Richard for dinner while Donald is away. After dinner she brings him to her room. They both get naked and begin kissing but Richard cannot get an erection. Susan finds out he is gay. They cuddle in bed and Susan tells him that she was complicit in the overthrow in Chile. This upsets Richard as he remembers how Raul was tortured.

Frederico Arenas calls Richard again, and Richard refuses his offer again.

Susan finds out about a man running for president from La Rioja, his name is Menem. She asks Richard if he thinks Menem has a chance of winning the presidency. Richard flies out to meet her in La Rioja to check him out, and finds her there with Jorge. Jorge is unsubtle about his relationship with Susan, and the way he flaunts their affair echoes back to his actions in Barcelona.

When Richard arrives home he agrees to Frederico Arenas's offer and becomes friends with him.

Richard also becomes friends with Senor Canetto, who he tells about the oil industry. Canetto introduces Richard to an investment banker who will lend him large sums at a good rate of interest. They both invest in oil. Richard becomes incredibly rich through his investments, and his contract with Arenas.

Richard attends dinner with the Canettos and runs into Pablo again. When Jorge and Pablo drive him to the train station after dinner, Pablo unties Richard's shoelaces in a flirty manner.

Part 3

Part three is shaped around Richard's relationship with Pablo. As this section opens, Richard's infatuation with Pablo grows, but he is still unsure as to whether Pablo reciprocates his feelings. Susan sets Richard up on a date with an American, and he is surprised when Charles (the American) asks him to use a condom during sex due to his fear about aids. He phones Pablo shortly after this encounter and they start dating. Pablo tells Richard the real reason he moved to America to study; the family maid walked in on Pablo having sex with his friend, and shortly afterwards his father pushed for him to go to America. Pablo never asked his father if the maid told him what had happened, but decided he would rather move than ask him.

Richard and Pablo fall in love. When Richard takes Pablo to visit his parents grave he thinks that after years of missing them and being alone he is finally content. They spend a weekend in Motevideo together. Whilst there they go to a gay club where they can kiss and slow dance in public without fear of judgement.

Richard sublets an upscale marina house from a US diplomat and invites Pablo to share it with him. They move in together, pretending to Pablo's family that he is only moving into the spare room so Richard can save on rent.

Pablo has two of his friends from California to stay, Mart and Jack who have been together for twelve years. When Pablo and Richard go to pick them up from the airport they learn that Mart has been treated badly by the airport security after they saw his AIDS medication. The four of them spend time together and Jack tells Richard that Pablo's ex-boyfriend died of aids, something which affected Pablo deeply. They think that Mart might have an infected line and take him to a doctor called Doctor Cawley. Before his friends leave, Pablo takes them and Richard to a restaurant and then to a bath-house where they scout for people to sleep with. Richard is initially reluctant to go to the bathhouse, but ends up enjoying sex with a stranger whilst there.

Donald and Susan reveal that they will be leaving Argentina soon. At a tense dinner Donald asks Richard how long Susan and Jorge have been sleeping together, and Richard reveals to Susan that he has been dating Pablo.

Susan and Donald have a farewell party. The next day Susan comes to say goodbye to Richard and they part. During this, it becomes clear that Mart is going to die and so Pablo decides to visit San Francisco where he and Jack live.

Richard goes to Miami for work, and hooks up with Tom Shaw, a blonde American he'd met a few times during previous trips. Pablo phones Richard once, but then does not phone back or respond to any of Richard's calls. When Richard arrives home he sees that Pablo has moved out of their house, and left a note breaking up with him.

Richard, devastated by the break-up, arranges to go to Tom Shaw's for the weekend and flies to New York. They do a lot of cocaine and have a lot of sex, but Tom is cold, only interested in physical gratification. Richard falls ill and decides he has to return to Argentina as soon as possible. On the flight home he cannot stop coughing, and is in agonising pain.

Richard goes to the Hospital who tell him he has pneumonia. Whilst in the hospital he realises he does not have anyone to put as his emergency contact, and gives his dead mother's phone number and information. Doctor Cawley visits him and tells him he has Aids. Upon release from the hospital, he calls Susan and breaks down crying as he tells her of his illness. He moves back into his old apartment, goes back to work, and slowly becomes used to the fact that he is going to die.

After his second meeting with Dr Cawley Richard runs into Pablo in the Doctor's waiting room. Pablo reveals that he was diagnosed with Aids during the weekend that Mart died. The pair lean on each other. Pablo has to stay in hospital to treat CMV, an eye disease that can cause blindness, and to have a line put in his chest. Richard visits him every day and when Pablo is released he takes him back to their house. The book ends as with Pablo deciding to live with Richard for a while, in their house by the Marina.

== Characters ==
- Richard Garay – an initially closeted young gay man living in Buenos Aires who first finds work as an English teacher. His friendship with the Canetto family (see below) provides a pathway to a more remunerative and exciting life as a go-between for American interests in Argentina after the fall of the military regime. The novel is seen through Richard's eyes. Toibin portrays Richard as individual who struggles with intimacy and, perhaps as a result, is susceptible to venal and calculating approaches by other individuals.
- Richard's father – An Argentinian who died when Richard was young. His family, the Garays, owned a small shipping business, which was slowly declining, and he was the third son. Richard recalls that his father paid little attention to him, but how special it felt when he did.
- Richard's mother – An English woman whose father brought her and her sister to Argentina after his wife died, in the 1920s. In the aftermath of Richard's own father's premature death, and their consequential impoverishment, Richard and his mother have a close but not intimate relationship which at times becomes a suffocating constraint upon his life. She takes refuge in a cultivated and intense Englishness, while Richard himself, fully identified with Argentina, disappoints her career-wise and conceals his homosexuality until shortly before her death. After her death, her legacy survives and appears to manifest in various ways through his actions and mentalities.
- Jorge Canetto – The Argentinian son of a potential Presidential candidate – Señor Canetto. Richard becomes friends with Jorge at university and tutors him in English. Richard claims to have fallen in love with Jorge but it proves to be more lust than love. They travel together to Barcelona where they meet a group of young Chilean refugees. When they return to Argentina Richard becomes more closely acquainted with the Canetto family; Jorge remains a minor figure through the rest of the novel, his sexual activity being a counterpoint to Richard's own.
- Señor Canetto – Jorge and Pablo's father. A Peronist with unfulfilled ambitions to be president.
- Pablo Canetto – The second son of the potential Presidential candidate. Richard's first real love; the relationship dominates the third part of the book.
- Susan & Donald Ford – Two Americans who dominate the middle section of the book. They enlist Richard's help as a translator and consultant, mainly to ensure a peaceful and smooth Argentine transition to a new political order, with an economy adhering to the norms of international business and open to foreign investment. Donald rather undiplomatically reveals Richard's sexuality by testing his response to a sexual advancement towards him in the shower room. Susan, on the other hand, is actually attracted to Richard, and only discovers his sexual orientation when in bed with him. Her later affair with Jorge is initially seen as an attempt to avenge Richard's lack of receptivity towards her, but she accepts his being homosexual and offers to help Richard find a partner, later setting up a date for him with an acquaintance from Europe. The couple become an essential part of Richard's development in the novel; their trust in him and vice versa builds his confidence and allows him to extend his engagement with the world. He is soon able to settle into the identity that they believed him to already retain, and they are the first people to know, beyond his mother and lovers, that he is gay.
- Mart and Jack – Pablo's friends from America. They have been in a relationship for 12 years when we first meet them. Mart is dying from aids.
- The Chileans – Refugees who live in Barcelona. Richard and Jorge meet them in the communal room of the pensión in which they are staying. They are experienced in political resistance and demonstration, and are willing to put their lives in danger for a greater cause. It appears to readers that they belong to another world, full of political tension, social reformation and a sense of unending possibility, danger, and excitement. His interactions with the Chileans reveal much more to him about himself than he could have initially imagined, and he returns to Argentina with an increased desire to get involved and recognize that which is going on around him.

== Themes ==
Tóibín's work regularly explores the themes of living abroad, creativity and personal identity, focusing especially on homosexual identity, and on identity when confronted with loss.

=== Identity ===
Garay's identity is complex and layered. His homosexuality is for the most part hidden; he has mixed origins (an English mother); his class status is fragile (he and his mother are middle class but impoverished); he is affected, like all Argentinians, by the atmosphere of fear marking the years of military dictatorship; the neoliberal turn in Argentina provides him with the opportunity to adopt new identities but they come across as just that – adopted.

Other figures in the novel have an impact on Richard's expression of his own identity. He is son, brother, colleague, friend, and lover throughout the novel and at different stages, but his sexuality remains a certainty.

The relationship with his mother, her alienation, deterioration, and ultimately her death can be seen as the rejection of his British identity for an acceptance of his homosexuality and identity as an Argentinian (and not half British) man. His mother embodied binary heteronormative behaviour, embracing Britishness and heterosexuality, and was dismissive of any sense of the "other". The alienation from the mother figure in favour of proximity with his partner Pablo, and other lovers, reinforces a negative portrayal of the constraints within a mother-son relationship.

=== Masculinity within the novel ===
Richard describes how in his youth he flirted with cross-dressing and a female persona. As an adult he is attracted to distinctly masculine men. He enjoys working with the American businessmen and ‘mimicking their masculinity’ as it gives him a sense of control. With his lover Pablo however, he finds himself able to be gentle and protective and to elicit the same responses from Pablo. His sexual responses to male figures in the novel are noticeably aesthetic, in that the attraction is primarily physical before anything else. The portrayals are realistic and allow the reader to fully appreciate the development of the romantic relationship between Pablo and Richard when it happens.

Overriding the novel is the polarised political situation of Argentina which is dominated by the masculine. The portrayal of the family is strictly nuclear, and all those who have the potential to be considered as powerful in Argentina are men with subordinate wives. Susan, although in a position of equality with her husband, is portrayed as conforming to a typically patriarchal view of women by attempting to seduce Richard, and later Jorge. She becomes a seductress with a strong sexual appetite and cannot just remain a diplomat in her own right.

=== Argentina and England ===
Richard's mother's preoccupation with Englishness is a mirror of her failure to flourish in Argentina, particularly once her Argentinian husband has died leaving her reliant on the limited charity of in-laws and the local Anglican church, in particular its vicar. Mother and son live together in a shabby apartment, but Richard distances himself from his mother's outlook. This may be in part because of his concealed homosexuality, which she only becomes aware of shortly before she dies. The Falkland War follows soon after. Richard's responds as a patriotic Argentinian, even though his acquaintances at times are concerned for him, given his part-English origins. Richard's bilingualism opens the way to many opportunities but they draw him into the orbit of the United States, not England, about which he exhibits neither interest nor a desire to visit.

=== Argentina as an Allegorical Substitution for Ireland ===
Costello-Sullivan argues that, as with other Toibin novels, Argentina as the setting with its "social and political exclusions" and the "representation of Argentina's oppressive, silencing polity invariably resonates with the Irish context".

=== Complacency, ignorance and moral choices ===
In an important discussion, the Chilean refugees acquaint Richard with their experiences when the Allende government was overthrown. In particular Raul's torture at the hands of the incoming Pinochet regime is detailed. Richard realizes he has always averted his gaze from evidence of police and official brutality in then military-ruled Argentina, the era of the Dirty War. At other points of the book two instances are detailed. The first occurs when Richard is having sex against a backdrop of noise from car engines revving and then being told by his pickup that the cars were powering cattle prods used to torture suspects at the police station opposite: "I still do not know if what he said was true . . . I did not pay much attention [then], I remember the pleasure of standing at the window with him, my hands running down his back, more than anything else." (p. 8). Years later an acquaintance from his university days, Francisco, challenges Richard over his seeming indifference to the disappearance and likely death of one of their fellow students at the hands of the authorities – Richard claims ignorance (pp 118–20). Later again, Susan Ford confesses to Richard that she was working for US intelligence in Santiago at the time of the overthrow of Allende (albeit in a subordinate role). Only years on did she fully realize her complicity in what happened at that time (pp 157–58). The theme is never fully worked out – that is, Richard does not become more morally aware in the course of the novel, unless his loyalty to Pablo could be so construed. The theme seems to be used to signal how morally numbed an individual can become living in a police state, or perhaps in almost any circumstances.

=== Neoliberalism ===
The two Americans, Susan and Donald Ford, are exemplary of the US wish to incorporate post-military Argentina into the US-led liberal world order. This includes shoring up a democratic political system but one which would not allow the return of Peronism, Argentina's mid-century experiment in radical (but more or less democratic) economic nationalism, to which the US had always been hostile. Lacking any strong political attachment Richard goes along with this, in part because he is made to see (a telling episode comes when he assists some visiting IMF officials: "did I know, they asked me that the train system of Buenos Aires lost five time its annual revenue?", p 115) that the existing political economy of Argentina was deeply corrupt. On another occasion he himself becomes complicit in a corrupt transaction. Rueful after the event, he is told some time later by Federico, his accomplice, that "things were different now . . . every move you make is watched, everything is countersigned" (p 245). At one point during the lobbying over the privatization of the country's oil industry, Richard becomes convinced that the privatization would be bad for Argentina (p 260), but the insight is not further developed nor does it lead to any change of course on Richard's part.

=== HIV/AIDS ===
The novel was published in 1996, at a time when new drugs, in particular AZT and protease inhibitors, were holding out the possibility of living rather than dying with HIV/AIDS. The novel captures a time – from the mid 1980s to the mid-1990s – when AIDS was not only deadly and fearsome but played havoc with many for whom neither their sexuality, nor the cause or character of their ill-health, could be disclosed to their families. No explicit parallel is drawn between this phase of the HIV/AIDS epidemic and the advent of economic liberalism in Argentina, but it could be argued that Richard's ignorance to the devastation wrought by the Dirty War and his ignorance to the HIV/AIDS epidemic operate in conjunction with one another.

=== Silence and space ===
The use of space in the novel is important in highlighting the sexual repression in Argentinian society. Richard initially seeks comfort from the space provided by the saunas during the novel, as a place where he can express his sexuality and seek refuge from the external stress of his daily life. His apartment after the death of his mother acts as a place for Richard to return to the reality of his life before his social and economic advancements; but soon becomes a place of stagnancy and deterioration from which he longs to escape. Likewise, the saunas become another setting for the expression of the silence, isolation, and uncertainty that was congruent with being homosexual at the time. As Tóibín notes, "…while I was there, I kept meeting gay people who had never told a single person that they were gay…" (O'Toole, ‘Interview’, p 97). Communication through spoken word is rare in the saunas too, and so the importance of silence is established because it manifests the sense of fear of the individuals in being discovered as homosexual in a largely homophobic society. Richard comes to realise, when discussing a gay bar with friends, that "everyone [there] is frightened. They stare straight ahead as though someone is going to tell everyone their big secret" (p 249).

== Awards and nominations ==
It won the Ferro-Grumley Award for the "Best Gay Novel of 1997".

== See also ==
- Dirty War
- LGBT in Argentina
- National Reorganization Process

== Bibliography ==
- "Colm Tóibín Critical Essays." Enotes.com, Enotes.com, www.enotes.com/topics/colm-toibin.
- "In Depth." BBC News, BBC, news.bbc.co.uk/1/shared/spl/hi/guides/457000/457033/html/.
- Tóibín, Colm, and Colm Toibin. "THE STORY OF THE NIGHT" Kirkus Reviews, www.kirkusreviews.com/book-reviews/colm-toibin/the-story-of-the-night/.
- Sette, Jorge. "Review: Colm Tóibín's The Story of the Night." Bookwitty, Bookwitty, 30 Nov. 2016, www.bookwitty.com/text/review-colm-toibins-the-story-of-the-night/5835d88250cef76fe7def833.
- "Fiction Book Review: The Story of the Night by Colm Toibin, Author Henry Holt & Company $23 (312p) ISBN 978-0-8050-5211-4." PublishersWeekly.com, www.publishersweekly.com/978-0-8050-5211-4.
