= House of Names =

Novel by Colm Tóibín

First edition (publ. Viking Press)

House of Names is a 2017 novel by Colm Tóibín, retelling the legend of the Oresteia, with divine elements largely removed and including a lengthy account of Orestes' absence after the death of Agamemnon. There are three narrators: Clytemnestra, Orestes, and Electra. The novel received mixed to positive reviews.

Tóibín commented to the Kenyon Collegian in 2017: "I took the story and every time I was stuck I went back to one of the versions just to get back into what happens next, how they're structured as drama rather than as poetry: Who says what? Who exits there? Who comes back into the room? So it wasn’t the language of them — I mean it wasn't the tone of them that I was using as much but the connection is… and you have speech you can get a funny sort of power with a heightened texture and a sort of eloquence that might come from the notion that the person speaking or writing is only doing them once and may not repeat this… The opposite of mansplaining is where Antigone, Medea, Elektra, Louise Glück, Sylvia Plath … Joan Didion. A woman writing poem and so somehow or other she has not spoken before or said this before so listen to her now because it may not come again. In other words the opposite is garrulous. So that the poetry I was interested in in those texts – in Sophocles, Aeschylus and Euripides- was when the woman gets to speak – what that sounds like now. And I was getting energy from that"
