= In Dublin (magazine) =

Discontinued Irish popular culture magazine

In Dublin was a magazine in Dublin established in 1976 by John S. Doyle, Ted Turtan and Kieran McGinley. Among its editors were the founder John S. Doyle, magazine publisher John Ryan, writer Colm Toibín, journalist John Waters (1985 to 1987) and Fiona Looney. Fintan O'Toole, Dave Fanning, Michael Dwyer, John McKenna, Mary Raftery, Derek Dunne and Nell McCafferty wrote for the magazine. In 1988 Doyle sold it to Vincent Browne.

Controversial at times, it was banned for six months in 1999 by the Censorship of Publications Board, which claimed that certain issues of the magazine were "indecent or obscene". It was suggested at the time that the magazine's advertisements caused the ban. When the ban was imposed, the magazine was owned by Mike Hogan and Mike Dawson, who bought it in 1995 and also published the political magazine Magill at the time. To circumvent the ban a new magazine Dublin was published in its place. Hogan sold In Dublin in 2004.
