= Bad Blood: A Walk Along the Irish Border =

- Author: Colm Tóibín
- Publication date: 1987

Bad Blood: A Walk Along the Irish Border was originally published by Irish novelist Colm Tóibín in 1987 with the title Walking Along the Border. The book includes photographs by Tony O'Shea, and describes the people and the landscape between Northern Ireland and the Republic of Ireland - and the past that haunted them at the end of the 1980s.
