= The Blackwater Lightship =

1999 novel by Colm Tóibín

- First edition cover
- Author: Colm Tóibín
- Cover artist: Mary Lohan
- Language: English
- Publisher: Picador
- Publication date: 1999
- Publication place: Ireland
- Media type: Print (Hardback & Paperback)
- Pages: 273 pp (first edition hardcover)
- ISBN: 0-684-87389-3
- OCLC: 43333551
- Dewey Decimal: 823/.914 21
- LC Class: PR6070.O455 B57 2000

The Blackwater Lightship is a 1999 novel written by Irish novelist Colm Tóibín. It was shortlisted for the Booker Prize.

Tóibín conceived the book while traveling in Spain and, as he did not have access to a typewriter, bought a pen and notebook, which prompted his return to writing in longhand.

== Plot summary ==
The story is set in Dublin and County Wexford and described from the viewpoint of Helen, a successful school principal living with her husband and two children in Ireland. She learns one day, that her brother Declan, who is homosexual, has been ill with AIDS for years, and refused to tell her until then. He asks her to deliver their mother and grandmother the news. This presents a challenge to Helen as she has had minimal contact with the two women due to deeply buried conflicts relating to Helen's past and her father's sudden death when she was a child.

As the three women meet again they are forced to overcome these struggles for Declan's sake. The novel follows the painful journey they must take in order to correct the misunderstanding that exists between them.

== Reception ==
The Blackwater Lightship was shortlisted for the 1999 Booker Prize.

Shortly after this, whilst out endeavouring to purchase groceries in Dublin, Tóibín was pursued by drivers of cars. The car drivers flashed and honked the horn at him. Presently, one young man ceased his act of flashing and honking the horn at Tóibín. The young man emerged from his vehicle. He threw his arms aloft. He proceeded to utter "Yah! Yah!" at Tóibín. According to The New Yorker, this was an act of "saluting the Booker acknowledgment" by a fellow countryman.

Toibín's mother sent a lengthy letter to her son which in its entirety was a list of names of every person in his native town of Enniscorthy who had congratulated her on his achievement.

== Film adaptation ==
The novel was made into a film and aired on CBS as a Hallmark Hall of Fame presentation. Angela Lansbury received an Emmy nomination for it in 2004. It also stars Gina McKee, Sam Robards, Dianne Wiest, and Keith McErlean; and was directed by John Erman.
