= Nora Webster =

2014 novel by Colm Tóibín

- Author: Colm Tóibín
- Language: English
- Genre: Novel
- Publisher: Scribner
- Publication date: October 7, 2014
- Publication place: Ireland
- Media type: Print (hardcover, paperback)
- ISBN: 9781439138335

Nora Webster is a historical novel by Colm Tóibín, published October 7, 2014 by Scribner. The story is set in Enniscorthy, County Wexford, Ireland in the middle of the 20th century.

== Reception ==
Nora Webster is a New York Times best seller.

The book received starred reviews from Kirkus Reviews and Booklist, as well as positive reviews from Publishers Weekly and Shelf Awareness.

Kirkus called Nora Webster "[a] novel of mourning, healing and awakening," noting that "its plainspoken eloquence never succumbs to the sentimentality its heroine would reject."

The audiobook, narrated by Fiona Shaw, received positive reviews from Booklist and Library Journal.

Kirkus Reviews named Nora Webster one of the best fiction novels of the year.

Awards for Nora Webster
Year	Award	Result	Ref.
2014	Booklist Editors' Choice for Adult Fiction	Selection	
2014	Costa Book Award for Novel	Nominee	
2014	Eason Novel of the Year	Shortlist	
2015	Carnegie Medal for Excellence in Fiction	Shortlist	
2015	Folio Prize	Shortlist	
2015	Hawthornden Prize	Winner	
2016	Europese Literatuurprijs	Nominee	
