= Brooklyn (novel) =

2009 novel by Colm Tóibín

- First edition cover
- Author: Colm Tóibín
- Language: English
- Genre: Novel
- Publisher: Viking
- Publication date: 29 April 2009
- Publication place: Ireland
- Media type: Print (hardcover and paperback)
- Pages: 256 pp (hardback)
- ISBN: 978-0-670-91812-6
- Followed by: Long Island: A Novel

Brooklyn is a 2009 novel by Irish author Colm Tóibín. It won the 2009 Costa Novel Award, was shortlisted for the 2011 International Dublin Literary Award and was longlisted for the 2009 Man Booker Prize. In 2012, The Observer named it as one of "The 10 best historical novels".

== Plot summary ==
Eilis Lacey is a young woman who is unable to find work in 1950s Ireland. Her older sister Rose organises a meeting with a Catholic priest called Father Flood on a visit from New York City, who tells Eilis of the wonderful opportunities awaiting her in New York with excellent employment prospects. Because of this she immigrates to Brooklyn, New York and takes up a job in a department store while undertaking night classes in bookkeeping. Her initial experiences working in a boring job and living in a repressive boardinghouse, run by the strict Mrs Madge Kehoe, make her doubt her initial decision. Letters from Rose and her mother bring about severe homesickness but soon she begins to settle into a routine. Eilis meets and falls in love with a young Italian plumber named Tony Fiorello at local Friday night dances. Eilis qualifies easily from her night school course. Her relationship evolves further and Tony brings Eilis to meet his family. Their romance becomes more serious, and Tony confesses his love for Eilis, and his plans to build a home on Long Island.

One day while Eilis is working she learns from Father Flood that her sister Rose has died in her sleep from a pre-existing heart condition. She has to return to Ireland to mourn, and she secretly marries Tony before she leaves. In Ireland she falls back into the town society easily. She goes to the beach with her friend Nancy, Nancy's fiance George and his friend Jim Farrell. Eilis knew Jim before going to America and disliked him, but now finds him much improved and they start seeing each other. Jim is the only child of a publican and is considered a good catch. Eilis's mother is desperate for her to settle back in Ireland and marry Jim, as Eilis has not confided in her or her friends about her marriage. Eilis procrastinates about a return to her new life by extending her stay. She saves Tony's letters unopened as she considers the possibility of remaining in Ireland and building a life with Jim Farrell. Eventually a local busybody, Miss Kelly, tells Eilis she knows her secret because she heard through the grapevine that someone from New York had seen her at a wedding registry. This is the turning point for Eilis and she immediately books her return passage, telling her mother the truth about her marriage and posting a farewell note to Jim as she leaves town by taxi for the docks.

== Reception ==
Robert Hanks for The Daily Telegraph referenced the immigration experience within the novel by saying, "American reactions to the Irish immigrant experience can easily tip over into hyperbole... Colm Tóibín’s Brooklyn is a controlled, understated novel, devoid of outright passion or contrivance, but alive with authentic detail, moved along by the ripples of affection and doubt that shape any life: a novel that offers the reader serious pleasure."

Scribner for Bookreporter said, "In his quietly perceptive prose, Colm Tóibín effortlessly captures the duality that lies at the heart of Eilis Lacey’s story. Brooklyn unassumingly offers both a classic saga of an immigrant coming to terms with life in her new land and an equally appealing story of one young woman’s grasp of a hard-won maturity."

Tóibín was commended on his description of the changes in American society during the 1950s, such as the department store's acceptance of "coloured" customers, Long Island's suburban boom, and the arrival of television. Many applauded Tóibín's measured prose and the calm tone of the novel, though Eilis has been described as being "so passive that you sometimes felt like giving her a good shaking."

In 2019, the novel was ranked 51st on The Guardian's list of the 100 best books of the 21st century.

== Awards ==
Brooklyn won the 2009 Costa Novel Award, was shortlisted for the 2011 International Dublin Literary Award, and was longlisted for the 2009 Booker Prize.

== Film adaptation ==
A feature film based on the novel was released in 2015. It was directed by John Crowley, features a script written by Nick Hornby, and stars Saoirse Ronan, Domhnall Gleeson, and Emory Cohen. The film won numerous awards, including three nominations at the Academy Awards, including Best Picture, Best Actress (Ronan) and Best Adapted Screenplay.

== Sequel ==
Long Island, the sequel to Brooklyn, was published on May 7, 2024. Upon its release it was selected by Oprah Winfrey to be an Oprah's Book Club 2.0 selection.

Set in the 1970s, 20 years after the events of the first novel, the book features Eilis and Tony, their children, and her in-laws on Long Island.
