= Colm Tóibín =

Irish novelist and writer (born 1955)

Colm Tóibín FRSL
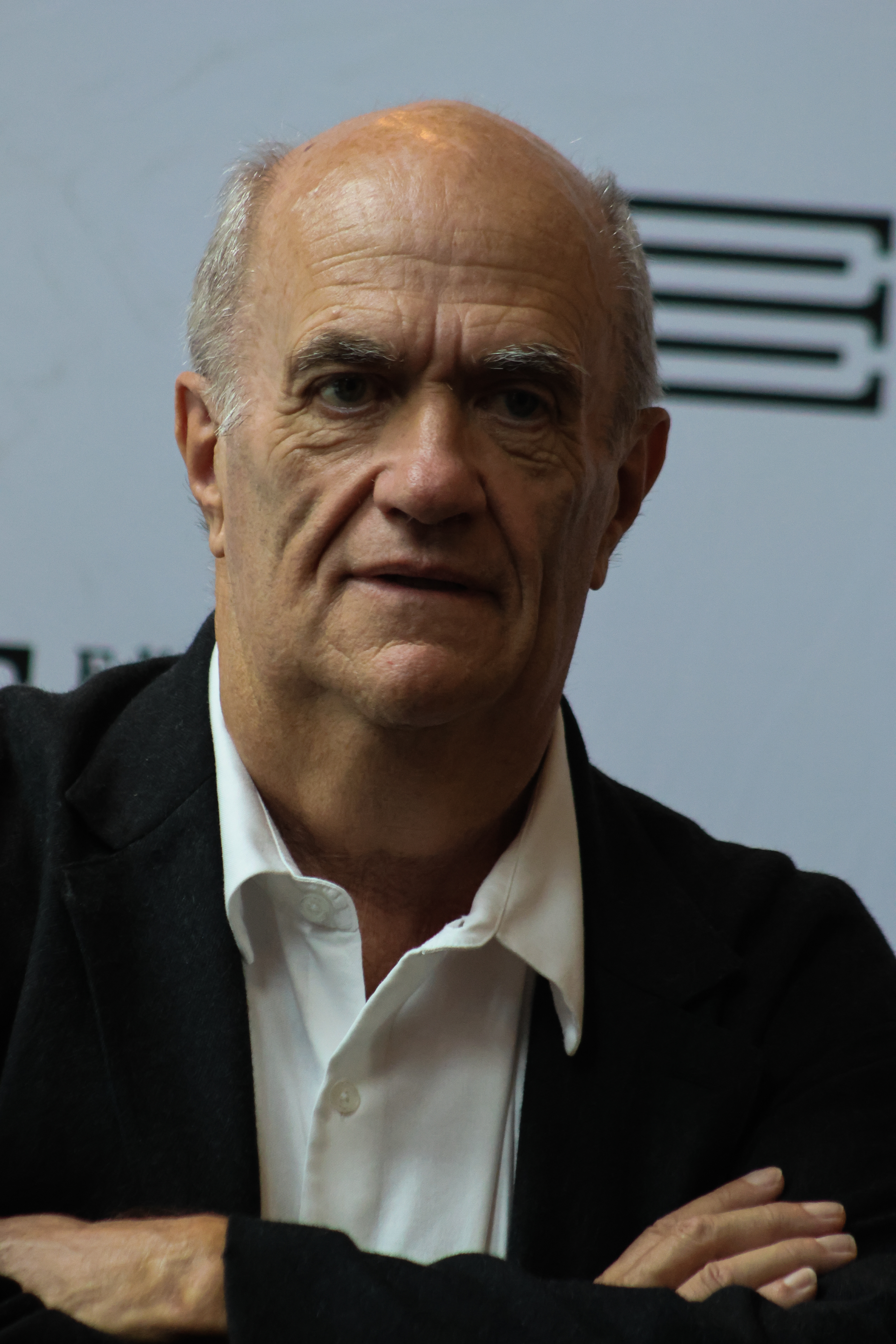
- Tóibín at the 2026 Edinburgh Book Festival

Chancellor of the University of Liverpool
- In office 2 February 2017 – 2022
- Succeeded by: Wendy Beetlestone

Personal details
- Born: 30 May 1955 (age 71) Enniscorthy, County Wexford, Ireland
- Education: UCD
- Occupation: Journalist; essayist; novelist; short story writer
- Website: colmtoibin.com
- Writing career
- Language: English (Hiberno-English)
- Genres: Essay, Novel, Short Story, Play, Poem
- Subjects: Irish society, living abroad, creativity, personal identity
- Notable works: The Heather Blazing; The Story of the Night; The Blackwater Lightship; The Master; The Testament of Mary; Brooklyn; Nora Webster; The Magician
- Notable awards: Encore Award; 1993; Los Angeles Times Book Prize for Fiction; 2004; International Dublin Literary Award; 2006; Irish PEN Award; 2011; Hawthornden Prize; 2015; Lifetime Achievement Award in Irish Literature; 2019; David Cohen Prize; 2021; Folio Prize; 2022

Colm Tóibín (/ˈkʌləm toʊˈbiːn/ KUL-əm toh-BEEN, Irish: [ˈkɔl̪ˠəmˠ t̪ˠoːˈbʲiːnʲ]; born 30 May 1955) is an Irish novelist, short story writer, essayist, journalist, critic, playwright and poet.

His first novel, The South, was published in 1990. The Blackwater Lightship was shortlisted for the Booker Prize. The Master (a fictionalised version of the inner life of Henry James) was also shortlisted for the Booker Prize and won the 2006 International Dublin Literary Award. Nora Webster won the Hawthornden Prize, whilst The Magician (a fictionalised version of the life of Thomas Mann) won the Folio Prize. His fellow artists elected him to Aosdána, and he won the biennial David Cohen Prize in 2021.

He succeeded Martin Amis as professor of creative writing at the University of Manchester. He was chancellor of the University of Liverpool from 2017 to 2022. He subsequently became Irene and Sidney B. Silverman Professor of the Humanities at Columbia University in Manhattan, New York City.

== Early life and education ==
Colm Tóibín was born in 1955 in Enniscorthy, County Wexford, in the southeast of Ireland. He is the fourth of five children. He was brought up on Parnell Avenue. by his parents, Bríd and Michael Tóibín.

His grandfather, Patrick Tobin, participated in the Easter Rising in April 1916, and was subsequently interned at Frongoch in Wales, while an uncle was involved in the IRB during the Irish Civil War. Following the foundation of the Irish Free State in 1922, Tóibín's family favoured the Fianna Fáil political party.

Tóibín grew up in a home where there was, he said, "a great deal of silence". Unable to read until the age of nine, he also developed a stammer. When he was eight years of age, in 1963, his father became ill and his mother sent her two youngest sons, Colm and his brother Niall, to stay with an aunt in County Kildare for three months so that she could take their father to Dublin for medical care; she did not call or write to them while tending their father. Tóibín traces the stammer he developed to this time – a stammer which would often leave him unable to speak his own name, and which he retained throughout his life. Tóibín's father – who was a schoolteacher – died in 1967, when his son was twelve years of age.

Tóibín received his secondary education at St Peter's College, Wexford, where he was a boarder between 1970 and 1972. He later spoke of finding some of the priests attractive. He was also an altar boy in his youth.

Tóibín went to University College Dublin (UCD), first attending history and English lectures there in 1972, before graduating with a BA in 1975. He thought about becoming a civil servant but decided against this.

== Early career ==
Instead, he left Ireland for Barcelona in September 1975. The city would later feature in some of Tóibín's early work: his first novel, 1990's The South, has two characters meeting in Barcelona. His non-fiction work Homage to Barcelona was published in 1990.

Tóibín left Barcelona in 1978 and came back to Ireland. He began writing for In Dublin. He became editor of the monthly news magazine Magill in 1982, and remained in the position until 1985. He left due to a dispute with Vincent Browne, Magill's managing director. In 1997, when The New Yorker asked Tóibín to write about Seamus Heaney becoming President of Ireland, Tóibín noted that Heaney's popularity could survive the "kiss of death" of an endorsement by Conor Cruise O'Brien. The New Yorker's fact checker telephoned Conor Cruise O'Brien to confirm that his endorsement would normally have that effect, but O'Brien said it would not, so the statement was not published.

== Personal life ==
Tóibín is gay. Since c. 2012, Tóibín has been in a relationship with Hedi El Kholti, an editor of the literary press Semiotext(e). They share a home in the Highland Park neighborhood of Los Angeles. He has served as a curator of exhibits for the Manhattan-based Morgan Library & Museum. He has judged both the Griffin Poetry Prize and the Giller Prize. Tóibín does not watch television, and his awareness of British parliamentary politics can be summed up by his admission that he thought Ed Balls was a nickname for the then Labour Party leader Ed Miliband. He is interested in tennis and plays the game for leisure; upon meeting Roger Federer, Tóibín enquired as to his opinion on the second serve.

As of 2008, he had family in Enniscorthy, including two sisters (Barbara and Nuala) and a brother (Brendan).

Tóibín lived on Southside Dublin City's Upper Pembroke Street as of 2005, where on occasions his friends — such as playwright Tom Murphy and former Gate Theatre director Michael Colgan — assembled for social interaction and entertainment. Tóibín spent his prize money from his 2006 International Dublin Literary Award on building a house near Blackwater, County Wexford, where he holidayed as a child. He filled this house with artwork and expensive furniture. He possesses a personal key to the private gated park at Dublin's Fitzwilliam Square, which is shut to ordinary members of the public.

In 2019, Tóibín spoke about having survived testicular cancer, which spread to multiple organs, including a lung, liver, and lymph node.

== Influences ==
Tóibin calls Henry James his favourite novelist; he is especially fond of The Portrait of a Lady, The Wings of the Dove, The Ambassadors, and The Golden Bowl. Tóibin fictionalized James in his novel The Master.

He would later fictionalize Thomas Mann in The Magician. He is especially fond of Buddenbrooks — which he first read in his late teens — and has also read The Magic Mountain, Doctor Faustus and the novella Death in Venice.

Tóibin's non-fiction was influenced by Joan Didion and Norman Mailer. He said decades after the publication of his debut novel, The South, "If you look at it, you see that the sentence structure is more or less taken from Didion", and expressed reservations about its quality.

In July 1972, aged 17, he had a summer job as a barman in the Grand Hotel in Tramore, County Waterford, working from six in the evening to two in the morning. He spent his days on the beach, reading The Essential Hemingway, the copy of which he still professes to have, its "pages stained with seawater". The book developed in him a fascination with Spain, led to a wish to visit that country, and gave him "an idea of prose as something glamorous, smart and shaped, and the idea of character in fiction as something oddly mysterious, worthy of sympathy and admiration, but also elusive. And more than anything, the sheer pleasure of the sentences and their rhythms, and the amount of emotion living in what was not said, what was between the words and the sentences."

Eavan Boland introduced him to the poetry of Louise Glück while Boland and Tóibín were at Stanford together in the 2000s. Tóibín stated in 2017 that "there are a few books of mine that I have written since then that I don't think I could have written had it not been for that encounter". When Glück was awarded the 2020 Nobel Prize in Literature, Tóibín immediately wrote an article in praise of her and had it published.

== Writing ==
Tóibín has said his writing comes out of silence. He does not favour stories and does not view himself as a storyteller. He has said, "Ending a novel is almost like putting a child to sleep – it can't be done abruptly". When working on a first draft he covers only the right-hand side of the page; later he carries out some rewriting on the left-hand side of the page. He keeps a word processor in another room on which to transfer writing at a later time.

He described his approach to writing in 2017: "When you're writing, you should be bent over, and you need to be in pain and your shoulders should be bent — you need to be pulling things up from within yourself. You can't be too comfortable."

Tóibín's 1990 novel The South was followed by The Heather Blazing (1992), The Story of the Night (1996), and The Blackwater Lightship (1999). His fifth novel, The Master (2004), is a fictional account of the inner life of Henry James. U.S. writer Cynthia Ozick said that his "rendering of the first hints, or sensations, of the tales as they form in James's thoughts is itself an instance of writer's wizardry". In 2009, he published Brooklyn, which was made into a movie in 2015. Its protagonist is Eilis Lacey, who emigrates from Ireland to Brooklyn. In 2012 Tóibín published The Testament of Mary, and in 2014 he published Nora Webster, a portrait of a recently widowed mother of four in Wexford struggling through a period of grief. A sequel to Brooklyn titled Long Island was released in May 2024, described by a review in Guardian as "a masterclass in subtlety and intelligence". The novel follows Eilis Lacey as she returns to Enniscorthy.

Tóibín has written two short story collections. His first, Mothers and Sons, was published in 2006, and was reviewed favourably (including by Pico Iyer in The New York Times). His second collection, titled The Empty Family, was published in 2010. It was shortlisted for the 2011 Frank O'Connor International Short Story Award.

Tóibín has written many non-fiction books, including Bad Blood: A Walk Along the Irish Border (1994) (reprinted from the 1987 original edition) and The Sign of the Cross: Travels in Catholic Europe (1994). He has written for the London Review of Books, The New York Review of Books and The Dublin Review, among other publications. Asked in 2021 how many articles he had written, Tóibín was uncertain: "I suppose thousands might be accurate". His article writing also contributed to his reputation as a literary critic; he edited a book on Paul Durcan, The Kilfenora Teaboy (1997), as well as The Penguin Book of Irish Fiction (1999), and with Carmen Callil he wrote The Modern Library: The 200 Best Novels in English Since 1950 (1999). He wrote a collection of essays, Love in a Dark Time: Gay Lives from Wilde to Almodóvar (2002), and a study on Lady Gregory, Lady Gregory's Toothbrush (2002). In his 2012 essay collection New Ways to Kill Your Mother: Writers and Their Families he studies the biographies of James Baldwin, J. M. Synge, and W. B. Yeats, among others. In 2015, he released On Elizabeth Bishop, a critical study that made The Guardian's Best Books of 2015 list twice. In June 2016, Tóibín visited Israel, as part of a project by the "Breaking the Silence" organization, to write an article for a book on the Israeli occupation, to mark the 50th anniversary of the Six-Day War. The book was edited by Michael Chabon and Ayelet Waldman, and was published in June 2017 under the title Kingdom of Olives and Ash: Writers Confront the Occupation.

Tóibín's play, Beauty in a Broken Place, was staged in Dublin in August 2004. He first wrote poetry while attending secondary school in Wexford. In 2011, The Times Literary Supplement published his poem "Cush Gap, 2007". The December 2021 issue of The New York Review of Books included his poem "Father & Son", which may be autobiographical, as the description of the son's developing a stammer in the second stanza—particularly on hard consonants—is similar to Tóibín's description of his own stammer.

In an article in The Guardian newspaper associated with the publication of his 2026 short story collection The News from Dublin Tóibín explains how he comes to write his fiction. He explains how in 2008 he started thinking of and writing a story about an Irishman long settled illegally in San Francisco in the US and planning to return to Ireland, knowing that he could never return, and would never see his adult daughter again. He set the unfinished story aside. When Donald Trump was elected as US president for the second time, stating his intention of deporting illegal immigrants, he took up the story again with the Irishman planning to leave on the day of Trump's inauguration, intentionally writing it, with the name Five Bridges, at the time of the inauguration.

His personal notes and workbooks are deposited at the National Library of Ireland.

== Lecturing ==
Tóibín has been a visiting professor at Stanford University, The University of Texas at Austin and Princeton University. He has also lectured at several other universities, including Middlebury College, Boston College, New York University, Loyola University Maryland, and The College of the Holy Cross. In 2017 he lectured in Athens, Georgia as the University of Georgia Chair for Global Understanding. He was a professor of creative writing at the University of Manchester, succeeding Martin Amis in that post, and currently teaches at Columbia University.

Commenting on the absence of gay students from his lectures, Tóibín said: "Whatever aura I have, it's not as a gay guru—I'm not Edmund White. 'My mother's reading your book'—I get that a lot".

In 2015, ahead of a referendum on marriage in Ireland, Tóibín delivered a talk titled "The Embrace of Love: Being Gay in Ireland Now" in Trinity Hall, featuring Roger Casement's diaries, the work of Oscar Wilde, John Broderick, Kate O'Brien, and Senator David Norris's 1980s High Court battles.

He was appointed Chancellor of the University of Liverpool in 2017.

== Publishing imprint ==
Tóibín founded the Dublin-based publishing imprint, Tuskar Rock Press, with his agent Peter Straus. He set up the imprint especially so he could publish the then unknown Hungarian writer László Krasznahorkai, who went on to win the 2025 Nobel Prize in Literature.

== Themes ==
Tóibín's work explores a number of main themes: the depiction of Irish society, living in exile, the legacy of Catholicism, the process of creativity, and the preservation of a personal identity, masculinity, fatherhood and homosexual identity, and on personal identity when confronted by loss. The "Wexford" novels (The Heather Blazing and The Blackwater Lightship) use Enniscorthy, the town of Tóibín's birth, as narrative material, together with the history of Ireland and the death of his father. An autobiographical account and reflection on this episode can be found in the non-fiction book, The Sign of the Cross. In 2009, he published Brooklyn, a tale of a woman emigrating to Brooklyn from Enniscorthy; characters from that novel also appear in Nora Webster, in which the young character of Donal seems to have been part-based on Colm's childhood. Two other novels, The Story of the Night and The Master, revolve around characters who have to deal with a homosexual identity and take place outside Ireland for the most part, with a character having to cope with living abroad. His first novel, The South, seems to have ingredients for both lines of work. It can be read together with The Heather Blazing as a diptych of Protestant and Catholic heritages in County Wexford, or it can be grouped with the "living abroad" novels. A third topic that links The South and The Heather Blazing is that of creation, of painting in the first case and of the careful wording of a judge's verdict in the second. This third thematic line culminated in The Master, a study on identity, preceded by a non-fiction book on the same subject, Love in a Dark Time. The book of short stories Mothers and Sons deals with family themes, both in Ireland and Catalonia, and homosexuality. As described by The New Yorker in 2021, his characters are "careful in conversation, each utterance fraught with importance... [his] novels typically depict an unfinished battle between those who know what they feel and those who don't, between those who have found a taut peace within themselves and those who remain unsettled. His prose relies on economical gestures and moments of listening and is largely shorn of metaphor and explanation".

Tóibín has written gay sex into several novels, and Brooklyn contains a heterosexual sex scene in which the heroine loses her virginity.

Bernard Schwartz informed Tóibin after The Magician was published that eight of his novels feature "someone tak[ing] a swim in cold water and hesitat[ing] before they go in" – Thomas Mann, the protagonist in The Magician, is sent swimming in the Baltic Sea. Tóibín had not previously noticed this.

== Awards and honours ==
Tóibín's fellow artists elected him to Aosdána, which is supported by the Arts Council.

Arts Council director Mary Cloake called Tóibín "a champion of minorities" as he collected the 2011 Irish PEN Award.

In 2017, Tóibin objected to the wording of an Arts Council letter, which was attempting to regulate artists and force them to produce a constant supply of work if they wanted to be paid a basic income (which would also be withdrawn if they were "temporarily incapacitated due to ill-health"). Tóibín wrote: "The first problem with this, as I'm sure you will agree, is that the phrase 'working artists engaged in productive practice' sounds oddly North Korean, or is like a phrase that could have been used by Stalin about recalcitrant farmers in the Soviet Union." Tóibín noted that W. B. Yeats had heart disease which incapacitated him in later life, yet days before his death, he wrote his poem "Cuchulain Comforted", which Tóibín called "one of the greatest poems in the English language." Tóibín also enquired of the Arts Council: "In the case of James Joyce, who 'produced' nothing between 1922 and 1939, what would you have done?" He referred to his personal experience with another writer: "I draw your attention to the fact that John McGahern published no novel between 1979 and 1990. I know, because I was in regular touch with him during some of those years, how much he struggled, but he 'produced' no novel... would you really have sent 'auditors' down to Leitrim to do 'a sample audit' of what he was doing?"

In 2011, John Naughton, of The Observer, included Tóibín in his list of Britain's three hundred "public figures leading our cultural discourse" — despite Tóibín, like Naughton, being Irish.

- 1993: Encore Award for a second novel, The Heather Blazing
- 1999: Booker Prize shortlist, for The Blackwater Lightship
- 2001: International Dublin Literary Award shortlist, for The Blackwater Lightship
- 2004: Booker Prize shortlist, for The Master
- 2004: Los Angeles Times Book Prize for Fiction, for The Master
- 2004: The New York Times, as one of the ten most notable books of the year, for The Master
- 2005: Lambda Literary Award, for The Master
- 2005: Stonewall Book Award, for The Master
- 2006: International Dublin Literary Award, for The Master
- 2007: Elected Fellow of the Royal Society of Literature
- 2008: Honorary degree of Doctor of Letters (D.Litt.) from the University of Ulster, in recognition of his contribution to contemporary Irish literature
- 2009: Booker Prize longlist, for Brooklyn
- 2009: Costa Novel Award, for Brooklyn
- 2010: Awarded the 38th annual AWB Vincent American Ireland Fund Literary Award
- 2011: International Dublin Literary Award shortlist, for Brooklyn
- 2011: Irish PEN Award, for contribution to Irish literature
- 2011: Frank O'Connor International Short Story Award shortlist, for The Empty Family.
- 2013: Booker Prize shortlist, for The Testament of Mary
- 2014: Named as a trustee to The Griffin Trust For Excellence in Poetry, which awards the Griffin Poetry Prize
- 2015: Hawthornden Prize, for Nora Webster
- 2017: The Dayton Literary Peace Prize Richard C. Holbrooke Distinguished Achievement Award
- 2017: Honorary doctorate from the Open University, for services to the arts and sciences
- 2017: The Kenyon Review Award for Literary Achievement
- 2019: Premio Malaparte (Italy)
- 2019: Bob Hughes Lifetime Achievement Award
- 2021: Notable Book, Critics' Top Book, and Top 10 Book of Historical Fiction by The New York Times, for The Magician
- 2021: Best Book of the Year by NPR, The Washington Post and The Wall Street Journal, for The Magician
- 2021: David Cohen Prize for Literature
- 2022: Folio Prize, for The Magician
- 2024: Würth-Preis für Europäische Literatur
- 2025: International Dublin Literary Award, Longlisted for Long Island.
- 2025: Honorary Doctorate Oxford University
- 2026: Budapest Grand Price

== Selected bibliography ==
Tóibín has published 11 novels.

- The South, Serpent's Tail, 1990, ISBN 978-0-330-32333-8
- The Heather Blazing, Picador, 1992, ISBN 978-0-330-32125-9
- The Story of the Night, Picador, 1996, ISBN 978-0-330-34017-5
- The Blackwater Lightship, McClelland and Stewart, 1999, ISBN 978-0-7710-8561-1
- The Master, Picador, 2004, ISBN 978-0-330-48565-4
- Brooklyn, Dublin: Tuskar Rock Press, 2009, ISBN 978-3-446-23566-3
- The Testament of Mary, Viking, 2012, ISBN 978-1451688382
- Nora Webster, Scribner, 2014, ISBN 978-1439138335
- House of Names, Scribner, 2017, ISBN 978-1501140211
- The Magician, Scribner, 2021, ISBN 978-0241004616
- Long Island, Picador, 2024, ISBN 978-1-03-502944-0; Scribner, 2024, ISBN 978-1-4767-8511-0

== See also ==
- List of Irish dramatists
- LGBT culture in New York City
- List of LGBT people from New York City

== Sources ==
- Ryan, Ray. Ireland and Scotland: Literature and Culture, State and Nation, 1966–2000. Oxford University Press, 2002.
