= 1985 in Ireland =

- Centuries: 18th; 19th; 20th; 21st
- Decades: 1960s; 1970s; 1980s; 1990s; 2000s
- See also: 1985 in Northern Ireland; Other events of 1985; List of years in Ireland

Events from the year 1985 in Ireland.

== Incumbents ==
- President: Patrick Hillery
- Taoiseach: Garret FitzGerald (FG)
- Tánaiste: Dick Spring (Lab)
- Minister for Finance: Alan Dukes (FG)
- Chief Justice:
  - Tom O'Higgins (until 1 October 1985)
  - Thomas Finlay (from 10 October 1985)
- Dáil: 24th
- Seanad: 17th

== Events ==
=== January ===
- 1 January – Cork celebrated 800 years as a chartered city.

=== February ===
- 26 February – Former minister Desmond O'Malley was expelled from the Fianna Fáil party.
- 28 February – 1985 Newry mortar attack: the Provisional Irish Republican Army (IRA) killed nine Royal Ulster Constabulary officers in a mortar attack at their station in Newry.

=== March ===
- 4 March – Irish singer Bob Geldof was honoured for his overseas aid efforts at a civic reception in the Mansion House in Dublin.
- 12 March – The Health (Family Planning) (Amendment) Act allowed the sale of condoms and spermicides to adults without prescriptions.
- 28 March – Gaisce – The President's Award was created by a trust deed under the patronage of the President of Ireland.
- 30 March – The Irish rugby team won the Triple Crown and Five Nations Championship at Lansdowne Road stadium in Dublin. They beat England 13–10.

=== May ===
- 16 May – The Minister for Education, Gemma Hussey, announced a new £20 million project to create a transition year in post-primary schools.

=== June ===
- 23 June – Three hundred and twenty nine people were killed when Air India Flight 182 exploded in midair 190 kilometres off the southwest coast of Ireland while flying the Montreal–London–Delhi–Bombay route. A bomb was thought to have been planted by the Khalistan movement.
- 25 June – Irish police foiled an IRA-sponsored bombing campaign in England which targeted London and English seaside resorts.

=== July ===
- 13 July – The international Live Aid charity rock concert took place in Wembley Stadium, London. It was organised by Irishman Bob Geldof and Scotsman Midge Ure. Ireland was the highest per-capita donor country.
- 22 July – Two women claimed to have seen a statue of the Virgin Mary moving in Ballinspittle, County Cork. The grotto became a pilgrimage site, and thousands visited there on 31 July.
- 25 July – Ireland was struck by a violent thunderstorm, one of the worst in the country's history.

=== September ===
- 2 September – Spike Island Jail in County Cork was left in ruins following a riot by prisoners.
- 10 September – The first heart transplant in Ireland was performed.
- 13 September — Two lesbians and former nuns, Rosemary Curb and Nancy Manahan, were interviewed on The Late Late Show television programme. A prayer vigil was held by objecting members of the public outside the television studio during the broadcast. An ensuing public outcry included petitions, protest vigils, and death threats made to the programme's presenter, Gay Byrne.
- 16 September — The Catholic Viewers and Listeners Association held its first meeting. The group was concerned by what they viewed as the undermining by broadcaster RTÉ of Catholic moral teaching and values, and RTÉ's alleged debasement of Christianity and normal family life.
- 20 September – President Hillery presented Bob Geldof with a cheque for £7 million as the Irish contribution to the Live Aid appeal.
- 29 September – The pleasure trawler Taurima, owned by leader of the Fianna Fáil party, Charles Haughey, was wrecked near Mizen Head lighthouse.

=== October ===
- 11 October – Shop steward Karen Gearon, representing striking workers at Dunnes Stores, addressed the United Nations Special Committee against Apartheid on a Day of Solidarity with South African Political Prisoners.
- 25 October – The first commercial flight departed from the new Knock Airport in County Mayo.

=== November ===
- 15 November – Taoiseach Garret FitzGerald and the Prime Minister of the United Kingdom, Margaret Thatcher, signed the Anglo-Irish Agreement at Hillsborough Castle.
- 27 November – Mary Harney was expelled from the Fianna Fáil parliamentary party due to her support of the Anglo-Irish Agreement.

=== December ===
- 11 December – The first mobile phone call in Ireland was made by the minister for communications, Jim Mitchell, to the broadcaster, Pat Kenny.
- 21 December – Desmond O'Malley founded the Progressive Democrats party.

== Arts and literature ==
- 18 February – Frank McGuinness's play Observe the Sons of Ulster Marching Towards the Somme opened on the Peacock Stage of the Abbey Theatre in Dublin, winning the Rooney Prize for Irish Literature.
- 1 June – Bruce Springsteen and the E Street Band played their debut Irish concert at Slane Castle in front of 100,000 people, and performed for four hours.
- 29 June – The first Croke Park concert took place, featuring U2, Squeeze, R.E.M., The Alarm, and In Tua Nua.
- Maeve Binchy's novel Echoes was published.
- Shaun Davey's orchestral suite for voice and uilleann pipes Granuaile was recorded.
- Tom Murphy's Conversations on a Homecoming (16 April) and Bailegangaire (5 December) were produced by the Druid Theatre Company in Galway.
- Alternative rock group Toasted Heretic was founded by Julian Gough in Galway.

== Sport ==
=== Association football ===
- Derry City joined the League of Ireland, having been out of senior football since 1972. Monaghan United was also elected to the League this year.

=== Boxing ===
- 8 June – Barry McGuigan won the WBA world featherweight boxing championship.

=== Gaelic football ===
- 22 September – Kerry defeated Dublin by 2–12 to 2–8 in the 1985 All-Ireland SFC final.

=== Golf ===
- Seve Ballesteros of Spain won the Irish Open.

=== Hurling ===
- 1 September – Offaly defeated Galway by 2–11 to 1–12 in the 1985 All-Ireland SHC final.

=== Rugby union ===
- 30 March – The Irish rugby team won the Triple Crown and Five Nations Championship at Lansdowne Road stadium. They beat England 13–10.

=== Snooker ===
- 27–28 April – Dennis Taylor won the Embassy World Snooker Championship in Sheffield, defeating the title holder Steve Davis in the final frame, 18–17.

== Births ==
=== January ===
- 11 January – Mark Yeates, association footballer.
- 13 January – Pat Flynn, association footballer.
- 20 January – Neil Gallagher, association footballer.
- 31 January – James "Cha" Fitzpatrick, Kilkenny hurler.

=== February ===
- 6 February – John Tennyson, Kilkenny hurler.
- 7 February – Michael Lyng, Cavan Gaelic footballer.
- 20 February – Alan O'Brien, association footballer.
- 28 February – Michael Fennelly, Kilkenny hurler.

=== April ===
- 2 April – Barry Corr, association footballer.
- 10 April – Willo Flood, association footballer.
- 23 April – Gary Mulligan, association footballer.
- 29 April – Pamela Myers, artist.

=== May ===
- 4 May – Laura Whitmore, presenter.
- 13 May – David Bell, association footballer.

=== June ===
- 8 June – Barry Murphy, association footballer.
- 15 June – Nadine Coyle, singer

=== July ===
- 6 July – Killian Scott, actor
- 10 July – Conan Byrne, association footballer.
- 17 July – Eoin Larkin, Kilkenny hurler.
- 22 July – Ryan Dolan, singer
- 28 July – Darren Murphy, Irish footballer

=== September ===
- 9 September – Tadhg Purcell, association footballer.
- 17 September – Brendan Clarke, association footballer.
- 20 September – George McMahon, actor.

=== October ===
- 2 October – Mark Quigley, association footballer.
- 6 October – Karl Bermingham, association footballer.

=== November ===
- 5 November – Ian Maher, association footballer.
- 14 November - Keira Keogh, Fine Gael TD for Mayo.

=== December ===
- 4 December – Stephen Dawson, association footballer.
- 4 December – Richie Power, Kilkenny hurler.
- 9 December – Mark Leech, association footballer.
- 24 December – Donnacha Cody, Kilkenny hurler.
- 29 December – Patrick Kavanagh, association footballer.

=== Full date unknown ===
- Caoilinn Hughes, novelist.

== Deaths ==
- 1 January – Sigerson Clifford, poet and playwright (born 1913).
- 18 January – Wilfrid Brambell, actor (born 1912).
- 19 January – Shelah Richards, actress, director, and producer (born 1903).
- 21 February – Dermot Ryan, Roman Catholic Archbishop of Dublin (born 1924).
- 3 March – Noel Purcell, actor (born 1900).
- 14 March – Kathleen Lemass, wife of Seán Lemass (born 1898).
- May – Tommy Murphy, Laois Gaelic footballer (born 1921).
- 16 June – Alexis FitzGerald Snr, solicitor, Fine Gael Seanad member (born 1916).
- 17 June – Bernard Bergin, cricketer (born 1913).
- 29 September – Timothy McAuliffe, Labour Party politician (born 1909).
- 11 October – Todd Andrews, Irish revolutionary and public servant (born 1901).
- 4 November – Liam Grainger, Gaelic footballer (Dohenys, Clonakilty, Carbery, Cork senior team, Munster) (born 1913).
- 4 December – Frederick Boland, diplomat, first Irish ambassador to Britain and to the United Nations (born 1904).
- 8 December – Jimmy Rudd, association football player (born 1919).
- 11 December – Kathleen Ryan, actress (born 1922).
- 17 December – Leo Maguire, singer, songwriter and radio broadcaster (born 1903).

=== Full date unknown ===
- Fergus Crawford, association football player (born 1933).
- Alex Stevenson, association football player (born 1912).

== See also ==
- 1985 in Irish television
