= 1992 in Ireland =

- Centuries: 18th; 19th; 20th; 21st
- Decades: 1970s; 1980s; 1990s; 2000s; 2010s
- See also: 1992 in Northern Ireland; Other events of 1992; List of years in Ireland

Events from the year 1992 in Ireland.

== Incumbents ==
- President: Mary Robinson
- Taoiseach:
  - Charles Haughey (FF) (until 11 February 1992)
  - Albert Reynolds (FF) (from 11 February 1992)
- Tánaiste: John Wilson (FF)
- Minister for Finance: Bertie Ahern (FF)
- Chief Justice: Thomas Finlay
- Dáil:
  - 26th (until 5 November 1992)
  - 27th (from 14 December 1992)
- Seanad: 19th (until 17 December 1992)

== Events ==
- 10 January – Former Minister for Justice, Seán Doherty went on the RTÉ television programme, Nighthawks, and told interviewer Shay Healy that the cabinet had discussed the tapping of journalists' phones in 1982.
- 20 January – Peter Brooke offered to resign as Secretary of State for Northern Ireland following criticism of his singing on The Late Late Show only hours after an Irish Republican Army (IRA) bomb exploded.
- 30 January – Charles Haughey resigned as Taoiseach and as leader of the Fianna Fáil party.
- 31 January – The Government sold the B+I Shipping Line to the Irish Continental Group.
- 4 February
  - Mary Robinson became the first President of Ireland to visit Belfast.
  - An off-duty Royal Ulster Constabulary officer in Belfast killed three people in a Sinn Féin office before committing suicide.
- 5 February – Loyalist gunmen killed five Catholics in an attack on a bookmaker's shop in Belfast.
- 6 February – Albert Reynolds was elected the fifth leader of Fianna Fáil.
- 11 February – Charles Haughey resigned as Taoiseach and was succeeded by Albert Reynolds.
- 18 February – Albert Reynolds discussed the situation with other party leaders as the High Court prevented a 14-year-old rape victim from going to Britain for an abortion.
- 26 February – The Supreme Court lifted the High Court ruling preventing a girl from travelling to Britain for an abortion; it was duly performed.
- 15 March – Proinsias De Rossa led a breakaway group from the Workers' Party to form what would shortly become Democratic Left. The majority of the breakaway group including De Rossa joined the Labour Party in 1999.
- 13 April – Two hundred and fifty years after the first performance of Handel's Messiah in Dublin, the Academy of St Martin in the Fields performed the oratorio at the Point Theatre.
- 7 May – Bishop Eamon Casey of Galway resigned following the revelation that he was the father of a teenage boy.
- 8 May – The third People In Need Telethon was held.
- 9 May – Linda Martin won the Eurovision Song Contest (staged in Sweden) for Ireland with "Why Me?". This was the first of three consecutive Irish wins.
- 31 May – Christy O'Connor Jnr won the British Masters golf tournament.
- 18 June – A referendum approved the Maastricht Treaty on European Union: 69.1% voted in favour; 30.9% against.
- 25 June – The issue of a new, smaller 5 pence coin meant that, after 21 years, it was no longer the same size as a shilling.
- 8 July – President Mary Robinson addressed both houses of the Oireachtas.
- 23 September – The IRA destroyed the forensic science laboratory in Belfast with a huge bomb.
- 3 October – Irish singer-songwriter Sinéad O'Connor on Saturday Night Live on U.S. television performed a song protesting against Catholic Church child sexual abuse and ripped up a photograph of Pope John Paul II, causing huge controversy.
- 5 November – The Government lost a confidence motion and the Dáil was dissolved. Two former Taoisigh, Charles Haughey and Garret FitzGerald, announced their retirement from politics.
- 6 November – A new purple £20 note depicting Daniel O'Connell was issued.
- 25 November – Three referendums were held on abortion-related issues. The right to abortion-related travel and the right to abortion-related information were supported.
- November – Pobal, originally named 'Area Development Management', commenced operation. It is a state-sponsored organisation in Ireland with responsibility for administering and managing government and EU funding aimed at supporting social inclusion and addressing social disadvantage in the country.
- November – An appearance by Christine Buckley on The Gay Byrne Show on RTÉ Radio 1 brought an "overwhelming response" from others who felt they had been victims of incarceration and abuse in industrial schools.
- 31 December – Unemployment reached record levels: 290,000 people were out of work.
- Undated – Trustee Savings Bank dropped the previous Cork and Limerick Savings Bank name.

== Arts and literature ==
- April – Patrick McCabe's novel The Butcher Boy was published.
- 11 September – Colm Tóibín's novel The Heather Blazing was published.
- 23 September – The Irish Film Institute opened the Irish Film Centre in Dublin.
- 30 September – Vincent Woods' play At the Black Pig's Dyke opened at the Druid Theatre Company.
- 30 October – Neil Jordan's film The Crying Game was released in Ireland and the U.K.
- Samuel Beckett's first novel, Dream of Fair to Middling Women, was finally published.
- Maeve Binchy's novel The Copper Beech was published.
- Eugene McCabe's novel Death and Nightingales was published.

== Sport ==
=== Association football ===
- 5 April – Shelbourne won their first League of Ireland Championship for thirty years.

=== Gaelic football ===
- Donegal beat Dublin by 0–18 to 0–14 in the 1992 All-Ireland Senior Football Championship final to win their first All-Ireland SFC title.

=== Golf ===
- Carroll's Irish Open was won by Nick Faldo (England).

=== Hurling ===
- Kilkenny beat Cork by 3–10 to 1–12 in the 1992 All-Ireland Senior Hurling Championship final.

=== Olympics ===
- 8 August – Michael Carruth won Ireland's first gold medal in 36 years at the Olympic Games in Barcelona. Wayne McCullough won a silver medal.

== Births ==
- 13 January – Ryan Connolly, footballer
- 16 January – Matt Doherty, footballer
- 23 January – Jack Reynor, actor
- 27 January – Sam Barry, tennis player
- 26 April – Shane O'Meara, actor
- 10 May – Sophie Vavasseur, actress
- 20 May – Jack Gleeson, actor
- 22 July – George Dockrell, cricketer
- 27 July – Neil R. Barrett, rugby player
- 9 September – Damian McGinty, singer and actor
- 27 September – Ryan O'Shaughnessy, pop singer
- 18 October – Barry Keoghan, actor
- 20 October – John Egan, footballer
- 14 November – Tadhg Furlong, rugby union player
- 24 November
  - Aaron Barry, footballer
  - Oliver Dingley, diver
- 25 November – Declan Hannon, hurler (Adare, Limerick)
- 26 November – Paul Dunne, golfer
- 2 December – Danielle Galligan, actress
- 4 December – Emma Eliza Regan, actress

== Deaths ==
- 9 January – Bill Naughton, playwright and author (born 1910).
- 20 March – Michael McLaverty, novelist (born 1904).
- 28 April – Francis Bacon, painter (born 1909).
- 12 May – Joseph Raftery, archaeologist.
- 13 May – F. E. McWilliam, sculptor (born 1909).
- 20 May – James Tully, former Labour Party TD and Cabinet Minister (born 1915).
- 3 June – Patrick Peyton, the Rosary Priest (born 1909).
- 6 July – Bryan Guinness, 2nd Lord Moyne, lawyer and poet.
- 21 July – Aloys Fleischmann, composer and musicologist (born 1910).
- 17 August – Tom Nolan, Fianna Fáil TD, Minister of State and MEP (born 1921).
- 23 September – Ivar Ivask, Estonian poet and literary scholar (born 1927).

=== Full date unknown ===
- Benjamin Guinness, 3rd Earl of Iveagh, peer and Seanad member (born 1937).
- Aidan MacCarthy, doctor, RAF medical officer, captured by the Japanese during the Second World War (born 1914).
- Matt O'Mahoney, international soccer player (born 1913).
- Peter Rice, structural engineer (born 1935).
- Jim Young, Cork hurler (born 1915).

== See also ==
- 1992 in Irish television
