= 1989 in Northern Ireland =

- Centuries: 20th; 21st
- Decades: 1960s; 1970s; 1980s; 1990s; 2000s
- See also: 1989 in the United Kingdom; 1989 in Ireland; Other events of 1989; List of years in Northern Ireland

Events during the year 1989 in Northern Ireland.

== Incumbents ==
- Secretary of State - Tom King (until 24 July), Peter Brooke (from 24 July)

== Events ==
- 8 January - Kegworth Air Disaster: A British Midland Boeing 737 on a flight to Belfast crashes onto the M1 motorway on the approach to East Midlands Airport killing 44 people.
- 12 February - Belfast solicitor Pat Finucane is shot dead by loyalists.
- 5 March - Gerry Adams of Sinn Féin says he wants a non-armed political movement to work for self-determination.
- 20 March - Chief Superintendent Harry Breen and Superintendent Bob Buchanan of the Royal Ulster Constabulary are killed by the Provisional Irish Republican Army. An inquiry concludes in 2013 that the Garda Síochána colluded in the ambush.
- 7 June - Short Brothers sold to Bombardier Aerospace.
- 3 November - Secretary of State for Northern Ireland, Peter Brooke, says the IRA cannot be entirely defeated militarily and talks could follow an end to violence.
- 13 December - Attack on Derryard checkpoint: The Provisional Irish Republican Army make a heavy attack on a permanent vehicle checkpoint in County Fermanagh manned by the King's Own Scottish Borderers; 2 British Army soldiers are killed.

== Arts and literature ==
- 3 May - Christina Reid's play The Belle Of Belfast City is premiered at the Lyric Theatre, Belfast.
- The BBC Northern Ireland film Elephant, concerning The Troubles and produced by Danny Boyle, is shown on BBC2 television.
- Robert McLiam Wilson's first novel, Ripley Bogle, is published and wins the 1989 Rooney Prize for Irish Literature and 1990 Irish Book and Betty Trask Awards.

== Sport ==
=== Football ===
- October 11 - The Republic of Ireland beat Northern Ireland 3–0 in a World Cup Qualifier at Lansdowne Road.
- Irish League

Winners: Linfield

- Irish Cup

Winners: Ballymena United 1 - 0 Larne

- League of Ireland

Winners: Derry City

- FAI Cup

Winners: Derry City 0 - 0, 1 - 0 Cork City

=== Motorcycling ===
- Robert Dunlop wins the 125cc race at the Cookstown 100, the Macau Grand Prix and the 125cc race at the Isle of Man TT.

=== Snooker ===
- 3 April - Alex Higgins beats Stephen Hendry to win the British snooker championship.

== Births ==
- 14 January - Dave McClements, football player
- 24 January - Adam McGurk, football player
- 6 February - Craig Cathcart, football player
- 10 April - Michael Dunlop, motorcycle racer
- 4 May - Rory McIlroy, golfer

== Deaths ==
- January - Jackie Wright, comedian (born 1905).
- 12 February - Pat Finucane, solicitor killed by loyalist paramilitaries (born 1949).
- 26 February - Joseph Fenton, estate agent killed by the Provisional Irish Republican Army for acting as an informer (b. c1953).
- 10 August - H. Montgomery Hyde, barrister, author and Ulster Unionist MP (born 1907).
- 12 September - Seamus Twomey, twice chief of staff of the Provisional Irish Republican Army (born 1919).
- 28 December - William Scott, Ulster Scots painter (born 1913).
- Margaret Barry, traditional singer (born 1917).

== See also ==
- 1989 in England
- 1989 in Scotland
- 1989 in Wales
