= 1998 in Ireland =

- Centuries: 18th; 19th; 20th; 21st
- Decades: 1970s; 1980s; 1990s; 2000s; 2010s
- See also: 1998 in Northern Ireland; Other events of 1998; List of years in Ireland

Events from the year 1998 in Ireland.

== Incumbents ==
- President: Mary McAleese
- Taoiseach: Bertie Ahern (FF)
- Tánaiste: Mary Harney (PD)
- Minister for Finance: Charlie McCreevy (FF)
- Chief Justice: Liam Hamilton
- Dáil: 28th
- Seanad: 21st

== Events ==
=== January ===
- 1 January – The Vocational Education Committees of the towns of Bray, Drogheda, Sligo, Tralee and Wexford were abolished.
- 14 January – The Mahon Planning Tribunal opened in Dublin Castle.

=== February ===
- 27 February – Ireland qualified for entry into the Economic and Monetary Union of the European Union.

=== March ===
- 15 March – Former Fine Gael party minister Hugh Coveney died in a fall from a cliff in County Cork.

=== April ===
- 10 April (Good Friday) – The British and Irish governments and all the political parties in Northern Ireland (except the Democratic Unionists) signed the Belfast Agreement (also called Good Friday Agreement).

=== May ===
- 22 May – The Good Friday Agreement was endorsed in a referendum by people north and south of the Irish border.

=== June ===
- 5 June – The National 1798 Rebellion Centre in Enniscorthy, County Wexford was officially opened by Taoiseach Bertie Ahern during bicentennial commemorations of the 1798 Rebellion.

=== July ===
- 1 July – The new Northern Ireland Assembly first met, in "shadow" form; Reg Empey and Seamus Mallon were elected First Minister and Deputy First Minister respectively.
- 11–13 July – The opening stages (Grand Départ) of the 1998 Tour de France were held in Ireland.

=== August ===
- 15 August – Omagh bombing: 29 people died in a car bomb explosion near the centre of Omagh, County Tyrone by the Real Irish Republican Army (Real IRA).

=== September ===
- 4 September – President Bill Clinton of the United States began his second official visit to the island of Ireland (his first being in 1995).
- 20 September - The TV3 television station was launched.

=== October ===
- 22 October - Whistleblowers at Our Lady of Lourdes Hospital, Drogheda, drew attention to the excessive number of hysterectomies carried out by surgeon Michael Neary.

=== November ===
- 26 November – Tony Blair became the first Prime Minister of the United Kingdom to address the Oireachtas.
- 30 November – Unemployment fell by 20% with the number of people in work rising by 100,000.

=== December ===
- 12 December – Members of the Labour Party and Democratic Left agreed to merge.
- 26 December – Great Boxing Day Storm ('Hurricane Stephen'): Severe gale-force winds hit northwest Ireland causing heavy disruption to services.
- 31 December – The punt currency was traded for the last time as the euro currency was launched.

== Arts and literature ==
- 28 February – Actor and comedian Dermot Morgan died suddenly in London.
- 25 May – Patrick McCabe's novel Breakfast on Pluto was published.
- 3 July – The boyband Westlife was formed.
- 28 August – Maeve Binchy's novel Tara Road was published.
- 20 September – The TV3 television channel went on the air.
- 7 October – Marina Carr's drama By the Bog of Cats opened at the Abbey Theatre, Dublin.
- 24 December – Gay Byrne broadcast his final radio show, from St Stephen's Green, Dublin.
- John Montague became the first occupant of the Ireland Chair of Poetry.
- Garry Hynes became the first woman to win a Tony Award for Best Direction of a Play (The Beauty Queen of Leenane) on Broadway.
- Brendan Graham's Great Famine novel The Whitest Flower was published.
- Terence Dolan's A Dictionary of Hiberno-English: The Irish Use of English was published.

== Sport ==
=== Association football ===
- St Patrick's Athletic won the League of Ireland.
- Cork City won the FAI Cup.
- Shelbourne's home UEFA Cup tie against Rangers was moved to England due to fears of sectarian trouble. Despite taking a 3–0 lead, Shelbourne lost 3–5.
- 8 May – The Irish under-16 team won the European Championship.
- 26 July - The Irish under-18 team won the European Championship.

=== Gaelic football ===
- Galway won the All-Ireland Senior Football Championship, beating Kildare in the final.

=== Golf ===
- Murphy's Irish Open was won by David Carter (England).

=== Hurling ===
- Offaly won the All-Ireland Senior Hurling Championship for the second time in five years.

=== Swimming ===
- 6 August – Olympic gold medalist Michelle Smith was banned from competition for four years for tampering with a drug test.

== Births ==
- 17 March – Nathan O'Toole, actor
- 2 April – Caelan Doris, rugby player
- 8 August – Liam Scales, footballer

== Deaths ==
- 26 January – Ernest Gébler, writer (b. 1914).
- 8 February – Niall Sheridan, poet, fiction writer and broadcaster (b. 1912).
- 28 February – Dermot Morgan, actor and comedian (b. 1952).
- 15 March – Hugh Coveney, Fine Gael TD and Cabinet Minister, yachtsman (b. 1935).
- 17 April – Robin Lawler, soccer player (born 1925).
- 6 May – Sybil Connolly, fashion designer (b. 1921).
- 22 May – Jim Power, Galway hurler (b. 1894).
- 26 May – Kate Cruise O'Brien, writer (b. 1948).
- 23 June
  - Paul O'Dwyer, lawyer and politician in the United States (b. 1907).
  - Maureen O'Sullivan, actress (b. 1911).
- 26 July – Seán Ó hEinirí, fisherman, seanchaí and monolingual speaker of the Irish language (b. 1915).
- 13 August – Liam de Paor, historian and archaeologist (b. 1926).
- 20 September – Robert Malachy Burke, Christian Socialist and philanthropist (b. 1907).
- 10 October – Tommy Quaid, Limerick hurler (b. 1957).
- 16 October – Patrick Hickey, visual artist (b. 1927).
- 11 November – Paddy Clancy, folk singer (b. 1922).
- 13 November – Valerie Hobson, actress (b. 1917).
- 21 November – John David Gwynn, cricketer (b. 1907).
- 26 December – Cathal Goulding, Chief of Staff of the Irish Republican Army and the Official IRA (b. 1923).

== See also ==
- 1998 in Irish television
