= 1992 in Northern Ireland =

- Centuries: 20th; 21st
- Decades: 1970s; 1980s; 1990s; 2000s; 2010s
- See also: 1992 in the United Kingdom; 1992 in Ireland; Other events of 1992; List of years in Northern Ireland

Events during the year 1992 in Northern Ireland.

== Incumbents ==
- Secretary of State - Peter Brooke (until 10 April), Patrick Mayhew (from 10 April)

== Events ==
- 17 January - Eight people are killed in the Teebane bombing carried out by the Provisional Irish Republican Army (IRA) in County Tyrone.
- 20 January - Peter Brooke offers to resign as Secretary of State for Northern Ireland following criticism of his singing on The Late Late Show only hours after an IRA bomb explodes.
- 4 February
  - Mary Robinson becomes the first President of Ireland to visit Belfast.
  - An off-duty Royal Ulster Constabulary officer in Belfast kills three people in a Sinn Féin office before committing suicide.
- 5 February - Sean Graham bookmakers' shooting: Ulster loyalist gunmen kill five Catholic customers in a retaliation attack on a bookmaker's shop in Belfast.
- 9 April - United Kingdom general election. The UK Conservative Party stands candidates in the province for the first time since the Ulster Unionist Party broke with them in 1972 but does not win any seats.
- 1 July - The Ulster Defence Regiment is amalgamated with the Royal Irish Rangers to form the Royal Irish Regiment of the British Army.
- 2 July - The IRA admits to murdering three men whose bodies were found by the army at various locations around Armagh last night. The men are believed to have been informers employed by MI5.
- 10 August - The Ulster Defence Association is proscribed by the Government of the United Kingdom.
- 4 September - Murder of Peter McBride, a teenager shot by two soldiers of the Scots Guards in Belfast.
- 23 September - The IRA destroys Belfast's forensic science laboratory with a huge bomb.

== Arts and literature ==
- Alternative rock band Ash is formed in Downpatrick.
- The Hole in the Wall Gang win a UK Sony Award for Best Radio Comedy for their first radio series A Perforated Ulster.
- David Park's novel The Healing is published.
- Glenn Patterson's novel Fat Lad is published.
- Martin Waddell's children's book Can't You Sleep, Little Bear?, the first in his Big Bear, Little Bear series, is published.

== Sport ==
=== Football ===
- Irish League

Winners: Glentoran

- Irish Cup

Winners: Glenavon 2 - 1 Linfield

=== GAA ===
- Donegal defeat Derry 0-14 to 1-09 to win the Ulster Senior Football Championship.
- Donegal subsequently defeat Dublin 0-18 to 0-14 to win the All-Ireland Senior Football Championship for the first time.

=== Golf ===
- New Strand course at Portstewart Golf Club, designed by Des Giffin, opened for play. The Irish Amateur Close Championship was played there.

== Births ==
- 1 January - Shane Duffy, footballer.
- 30 May - Thomas McBride, footballer.
- 12 March - Ciara Mageean, middle-distance runner (died 2026).
- 1 June - Dean Jarvis, footballer.
- 4 July - Jamie Douglas, footballer.
- 12 July - Eoghan Quigg, pop singer.
- 9 September - Damian McGinty, actor and singer.
- 17 September - William Buller, racing driver.

== Deaths ==
- 20 March - Michael McLaverty, novelist (born 1904).
- 16 April - Stanley McMaster, barrister and Unionist Member of Parliament from 1959 to 1974 (born 1926).
- 13 May - F. E. McWilliam, sculptor (born 1909).
- 25 November - Pearse Jordan, Provisional Irish Republican Army volunteer killed by RUC (born 1969).

== See also ==
- 1992 in England
- 1992 in Scotland
- 1992 in Wales
