= 1995 in Ireland =

- Centuries: 18th; 19th; 20th; 21st
- Decades: 1970s; 1980s; 1990s; 2000s; 2010s
- See also: 1995 in Northern Ireland; Other events of 1995; List of years in Ireland

Events from the year 1995 in Ireland.

== Incumbents ==
- President: Mary Robinson
- Taoiseach: John Bruton (FG)
- Tánaiste: Dick Spring (Lab)
- Minister for Finance: Ruairi Quinn (Lab)
- Chief Justice: Liam Hamilton
- Dáil: 27th
- Seanad: 20th

== Events ==
=== January ===
- 27 January – Taoiseach, John Bruton, and Sinn Féin leader Gerry Adams held their first formal peace discussions.

=== February ===
- 2 February – President Mary Robinson addressed a joint session of the Houses of the Oireachtas.
- 15 February – English football hooligans rioted at Lansdowne Road stadium in Dublin during a friendly match between Ireland and England. The match was abandoned with Ireland 1–0 ahead. There were over 70 injuries, most of them English. The English fans were escorted out of Ireland by the Army.
- 22 February – The British Prime Minister, John Major, and the Taoiseach, John Bruton, launched a peace framework document for Northern Ireland.

=== March ===
- 7 March – Sir Patrick Mayhew, Northern Ireland Secretary, set out the conditions for Sinn Féin to join all-party peace talks, including "the actual decommissioning of some arms."
- 14 March – The American embassy in Dublin wrote to the Department of Foreign Affairs to say that the United States space administration, NASA, might need to use Shannon Airport as a landing site for their Space Shuttles during possible launch emergencies. The Americans said their spacecraft would be retrieved from Shannon and that they would pay compensation if it missed the airport and crashed on a populated area. They also mentioned that Irish authorities were obliged to allow the spacecraft to land according to international treaties signed by Ireland.
- 19 March – Dublin boxer Steve Collins beat world champion Chris Eubank to win the World Boxing Organization super middleweight championship title.

=== April ===
- 10 April – The Heritage Act 1995 was signed into law.

=== May ===
- 19 May – Elizabeth II and the Duke of Edinburgh made a visit to Northern Ireland. On the same day US President Bill Clinton approved a visa for Gerry Adams to enter the United States.
- 23 May – President Robinson visited the Choctaw Nation of Oklahoma to express the thanks of the Irish people for a donation by the tribe to the starving people of Ireland during the Great Famine in April 1847.
- 25 May – The last edition of The Irish Press newspaper was published.
- 31 May – The Prince of Wales began his first official visit to Dublin.

=== June ===
- 4 June – Ireland qualified for the quarterfinals of the 1995 Rugby World Cup.

=== July ===
- 10 July – The Heritage Council was established under the Heritage Act, 1995, to "propose policies and priorities for the identification, protection, preservation, and enhancement of the national heritage" with a headquarters in Kilkenny.

=== August ===
- 13 August – Gerry Adams told a rally in Belfast that the Irish Republican Army (IRA) "haven't gone away."

=== September ===
- 9 September – David Trimble became leader of the Ulster Unionist Party.
- 13 September – The Cabinet agreed the wording of a Constitutional Amendment on divorce.
- 25 September – The Censorship of Publications Board removed a ban on the sale of Playboy magazine, following the magazine's appeal against the prohibition. The National Women's Council of Ireland protested against the removal of the ban, which had existed since 1961.

=== November ===
- 2 November – A new blue-coloured £50 note featuring former president Douglas Hyde was issued.
- 11 November – Neil Blaney, the longest serving member of the Dáil, was buried on the Fanad Peninsula in County Donegal.
- 17 November – Virgin Cinemas Dublin (Cineworld Dublin from 2005 onwards) opened on Dublin's Parnell Street. The first film to premiere at the cinema was The Brothers McMullen.
- 21 November – South Africa's deputy-President, F. W. de Klerk, addressed a Forum for Peace and Reconciliation at Dublin Castle.
- 24 November – In the divorce referendum, citizens voted narrowly to allow divorce. A vote recount two days later confirmed the result.
- 24 November – The Royal Canal Amenity Group (RCAG) installed a memorial plaque into the wall of Kennan Bridge, near Clonsilla, County Dublin on the 150th anniversary of the 1845 Royal Canal disaster
- 30 November – American President Bill Clinton and his wife Hillary spent the day in Northern Ireland.

=== December ===
- 1 December – President Bill Clinton addressed both Houses of the Oireachtas in Dublin. Afterwards, he addressed 80,000 people in College Green. Later, he attended a state dinner at Dublin Castle.
- 12 December – Plans for a £200 million light rail transit system in Dublin were announced. Eventually to be called Luas, it was to connect the city centre with Sandyford, Tallaght and Ballymun.
- 16 December – A tribunal was established to compensate victims of Hepatitis C.
- 21 December – Jack Charlton retired as manager of the Irish football team.

== Arts and literature ==
- 24 January – The Chieftains' album The Long Black Veil was released. It included collaborations with Van Morrison (on Have I Told You Lately) and Sinéad O'Connor (on folk songs including He Moved Through the Fair).
- 21 April – Sitcom Father Ted, written by Arthur Mathews and Graham Linehan and starring Dermot Morgan and Ardal O'Hanlon, first aired on Channel 4 television in the United Kingdom.
- 2–23 May – Historical mini-series The Hanging Gale premiered on RTÉ One television.
- 13 May – Ireland staged the Eurovision Song Contest.
- 5 October – Poet Seamus Heaney was awarded the Nobel Prize for Literature.
- The memorial sculpture Universal Links on Human Rights was commissioned in Dublin
- Sebastian Barry's play The Steward of Christendom was produced for the first time.
- Phil Coulter wrote the anthem Ireland's Call to a commission from the Irish Rugby Football Union.
- Emma Donoghue's novel Hood was published.
- Anne Enright's first novel The Wig My Father Wore was published.
- Marian Keyes' first novel Watermelon was published.
- Patrick McCabe's novel The Dead School was published.
- Rachel Joynt and Remco de Fouw's sculpture Perpetual Motion was installed on the Naas by-pass.

== Sport ==
=== Association football ===
- 15 February – A match between Ireland and England was abandoned in the first half after some of the England fans ripped out seating in the West Stand of Lansdowne Road stadium and hurled it onto the pitch. Ireland had been leading 1–0 before the match was stopped.

=== Boxing ===
- 9 September – Steve Collins, "The Celtic Warrior", successfully defended his World Boxing Organization super middleweight title against Chris Eubank at the Green Glens Arena, Millstreet, County Cork.

=== Gaelic football ===
- 17 September – Dublin were the All-Ireland football Champions following victory over Tyrone.

=== Golf ===
- The Irish Open was won by Sam Torrance (Scotland).

=== Hurling ===
- Under new manager Ger Loughnane, Clare won the All-Ireland Senior Hurling Championship for the first time since 1914.

== Births ==
- 3 February – Orla Gartland, singer-songwriter
- 11 April – Sycerika McMahon, swimmer
- 5 August – Evan Finnegan, footballer
- 6 September – Oisin Murphy, jockey
- Unknown date – Chris Walley, actor

== Deaths ==
=== February ===
- 1 February – Tom O'Reilly, Cavan Gaelic footballer and independent teachta dála (TD) for Cavan 1944–1948 (born 1915)
- 5 February – Des Foley, Gaelic footballer and hurler and Fianna Fáil TD (born 1940).
- 20 February – Thom McGinty ("The Diceman"), actor, model, and street mime artist (born 1952).

=== March ===
- 14 March – Gerard Victory, composer (born 1921).
- 30 March
  - Harold Marcus Ervine-Andrews, soldier, recipient of the Victoria Cross for gallantry in 1940 near Dunkirk, France (born 1911).
  - John Lighton Synge, mathematician and physicist (born 1897).

=== April ===
- 3 April – Jeremiah Newman, Bishop of Limerick.
- 14 April – Brian Coffey, poet and publisher (born 1905).
- 24 April – Florrie Burke, association footballer (born 1918).

=== June ===
- 7 June – Joseph Tomelty, actor and playwright.
- 14 June – Rory Gallagher, guitarist (born 1948).
- 25 June – Ernest Walton, physicist, 1951 Nobel Prize for Physics (born 1903).
- 27 June – Gordon Wilson, peace campaigner (born 1927).

=== July ===
- 4 July – Seán Fallon, Fianna Fáil politician, Cathaoirleach of Seanad Éireann from 1992 until his death. (born 1937)
- 12 July – Muriel Gahan, promoter of country crafts.
- 19 July – Paddy Keaveney, Independent Fianna Fáil TD (born 1929).

=== August ===
- 23 August – Johnny Carey, association footballer and manager (born 1919).

=== September ===
- 21 September – Frank Hall, journalist and satirist (born 1921).
- 27 September – Sean Conway, Fianna Fáil senator.

=== October ===
- 16 October – Gus Martin, 59, literary academic, broadcaster, teacher, author, senator.

=== November ===
- 1 November – Brian Lenihan, Fianna Fáil TD, cabinet minister and Seanad Éireann member (born 1930).
- 8 November – Neil Blaney, Fianna Fáil TD, cabinet minister and MEP (born 1922).

=== December ===
- 8 December – Philip Lawrence, London-based headmaster stabbed to death outside the gates of his school when he went to help a pupil being attacked by a gang (born 1947).
- 18 December – Colville Deverell, cricketer and politician (born 1907).
- 19 December – P. A. Ó Síocháin, journalist, author and lawyer (born 1905).
- 25 December – James Boucher, cricketer (born 1910).

=== Full date unknown ===
- Niall Ó Dónaill, Irish language lexicographer and writer (born 1908).

== See also ==
- 1995 in Irish television
