= 1993 in Ireland =

- Centuries: 18th; 19th; 20th; 21st
- Decades: 1970s; 1980s; 1990s; 2000s; 2010s
- See also: 1993 in Northern Ireland; Other events of 1993; List of years in Ireland

Events from the year 1993 in Ireland.

== Incumbents ==
- President: Mary Robinson
- Taoiseach: Albert Reynolds (FF)
- Tánaiste:
  - John Wilson (FF) (until 12 January 1993)
  - Dick Spring (Lab) (from 12 January 1993)
- Minister for Finance: Bertie Ahern (FF)
- Chief Justice: Thomas Finlay
- Dáil: 27th
- Seanad: 20th (from 17 February 1993)

== Events ==
- 8–17 January – The Braer Storm blew in the North Atlantic.
- 12 January – Albert Reynolds was elected Taoiseach in Dáil Éireann. A Fianna Fáil–Labour Party coalition government came to power.
- 10 March – The Gaelic Athletic Association received planning permission for the redevelopment of the Croke Park stadium.
- 25 March – Castlerock killings: four Catholics were shot dead by the Ulster Defence Association as they arrived for work in Castlerock, County Londonderry, Northern Ireland.
- 20 May - Waterford gets a new shopping centre called "City Square".
- 27 May – The first meeting of an Irish head of state with a British monarch took place when President Mary Robinson makes a private visit to Queen Elizabeth II at Buckingham Palace.
- 1 June – Mother Teresa met President Mary Robinson at Áras an Uachtaráin.
- 24 June – Dáil Éireann passed the Criminal Law (Sexual Offences) Act, decriminalising consensual homosexual acts.
- 15 July – The Beef Tribunal ended after 226 days.
- September – The sale of land beside a Dublin convent and the consequent exhumation of at least 133 former residents of a Magdalene asylum from unmarked graves brought the existence of these institutions to wide public attention.
- 16 September – A new green coloured £10 note was issued depicting the writer James Joyce.
- 23 October – Shankill Road bombing – Ten people were killed when a Provisional Irish Republican Army (IRA) bomb exploded at a fish shop on the Shankill Road in Belfast.
- 30 October – Greysteel massacre – The Ulster Defence Association shot 21 people in the Rising Sun Bar in Greysteel, County Londonderry, Northern Ireland, during a Hallowe'en party. They chose the pub as it was in a Catholic area.
- 12 November – The issue of a new, smaller 10 pence coin meant there was no longer a coin equivalent in size to a florin after 22 years.
- December – Brú na Bóinne became the first UNESCO World Heritage Site designated in Ireland.
- 15 December – Taoiseach Albert Reynolds and British Prime Minister John Major issued a joint Downing Street Declaration on the future of Northern Ireland.
- 25 December – Elizabeth II spoke of her hopes for peace in Northern Ireland in her Christmas Day speech to the U.K.
- 29 December – The IRA announced it would fight on against the British presence in Northern Ireland.

== Arts and literature ==
- 15 May – Niamh Kavanagh won the Eurovision Song Contest (staged at the Green Glens Arena in Millstreet, County Cork) for Ireland with In Your Eyes, the second of three consecutive Irish wins.
- 6 August – The television film The Snapper was released.
- 26–7 August – The band U2 played two concerts at the RDS Showgrounds.
- 11 November – The final Jacob's Broadcasting Awards ceremony took place in Dublin.
- 16 December – The world première of the film In the Name of the Father was held at the Savoy Cinema in Dublin.
- Roddy Doyle was awarded the Booker Prize for his novel Paddy Clarke Ha Ha Ha.
- John Banville's novel Ghosts was published.
- The Irish Film Board was re-established as a funding body under the chairmanship of Lelia Doolan.

== Sport ==
=== Association football ===
==== Domestic football ====
- Shelbourne defeated Dundalk 1–0 at Lansdowne Road to win the FAI Cup.

==== International football ====
- Alan McLoughlin scored as Ireland drew 1–1 with Northern Ireland to qualify for the 1994 FIFA World Cup in the USA.
- Ireland also went 6th in the world to reach their highest FIFA ranking to date.

=== Athletics ===
- Runner Marcus O'Sullivan won the world indoor 1,500-metre championship for the third time, in Toronto.

=== Gaelic football ===
- Derry beat Cork 1–14 to 2–8 to win the All-Ireland Senior Football Championship for the first time.

=== Golf ===
- The Irish Open was won by Nick Faldo (England).

=== Hurling ===
- Kilkenny beat Galway 2–17 to 1–15 to win their second consecutive All-Ireland Senior Hurling Championship.

=== Mountaineering ===
- Pat Falvey and Dawson Stelfox became the first Irish people to reach the summit of Mount Everest.

== Births ==
- 6 January – Al Porter, entertainer
- 21 February – Shane Dowling, hurler (Na Piarsaigh, Limerick).
- 20 April – Dan Morrissey, hurler (Ahane, Limerick)
- 25 April – Josh van der Flier, Rugby player
- 6 June – Aisling Franciosi, screen actress
- 27 June – Rejjie Snow, born Alex Anyaegbunam, hip hop musician
- 7 July – Ciarán Kilkenny, Gaelic footballer
- 5 August – Patrick McBrearty, Donegal Gaelic football superstar
- 13 September – Niall Horan, member of boy band One Direction

== Deaths ==
- 5 February – Seán Flanagan, Gaelic footballer, captain of winning Mayo All Ireland football teams in 1950s, Fianna Fáil TD, Cabinet Minister and MEP (born 1922).
- 11 February – Brian Inglis, journalist, historian and television presenter (born 1916).
- 15 February – Peter Kavanagh, soccer player (born 1910).
- 23 March – Denis Parsons Burkitt, surgeon (born 1911).
- April – Denis Hegarty, public servant.
- 5 May – Dermot Boyle, Marshal of the Royal Air Force (born 1904).
- 29 June – Patrick Lindsay, Fine Gael TD and lawyer (born 1914).
- 28 July – Stanley Woods, motor cycle racer, with 29 Grand Prix wins and 10 Isle of Man TT wins (born 1903).
- 14 September – Sheelagh Murnaghan, only Ulster Liberal Party Member of Parliament at Stormont (born 1924).
- 7 October – Cyril Cusack, actor (born 1910).
- 1 November – Maeve Brennan, short story writer and journalist (born 1917).
- 15 November – Jimmy McAlinden, soccer player and manager (born 1917).
- 28 November – Joe Kelly, motor racing driver (born 1913).
- 29 December – Marie Kean, actress (born 1918).
- 31 December – Michael Cleary, priest and media personality, throat cancer (born 1933)

== See also ==
- 1993 in Irish television
