= 1997 in Ireland =

- Centuries: 18th; 19th; 20th; 21st
- Decades: 1970s; 1980s; 1990s; 2000s; 2010s
- See also: 1997 in Northern Ireland; Other events of 1997; List of years in Ireland

Events from the year 1997 in Ireland.

== Incumbents ==
- President:
  - Mary Robinson (until 12 September 1997)
  - Mary McAleese (from 11 November 1997)
- Taoiseach (prime minister):
  - John Bruton (Fine Gael) (until 26 June 1997)
  - Bertie Ahern (Fianna Fáil) (from 26 June 1997)
- Tánaiste (deputy prime minister):
  - Dick Spring (Labour) (until 26 June 1997)
  - Mary Harney (Progressive Democrats) (from 26 June 1997)
- Minister for Finance:
  - Ruairi Quinn (Labour) (until 26 June 1997)
  - Charlie McCreevy (Fianna Fáil) (from 26 June 1997)
- Chief Justice: Liam Hamilton
- Dáil:
  - 27th (until 15 May 1997)
  - 28th (from 26 June 1997)
- Seanad:
  - 20th (until 10 July 1997)
  - 21st (from 17 September 1997)

== Events ==
- The real estate and property rental website Daft.ie was launched in 1997 by brothers Brian and Eamonn Fallon.

=== January ===
- 8 January – Russia sought to widen its ban on the importation of Irish beef due to bovine spongiform encephalopathy.

=== February ===
- 27 February – A new law providing for divorce came into effect.

=== March ===
- 6 March – Michael Lowry resigned as a member of the Fine Gael party.
- 7 March – President Mary Robinson met Pope John Paul II in the Vatican.
- 17 March – The new national independent radio station, Radio Ireland, went on the air.
- 21 March – The British supermarket company Tesco bought the Irish Quinnsworth and Crazy Prices supermarket chains.

=== April ===
- 8 April – Author Frank McCourt was awarded the Pulitzer Prize for his book Angela's Ashes.

=== June ===
- 3 June – The Brú na Bóinne Visitor Centre was officially opened near Newgrange in Donore, County Meath by the then-Minister for Arts, Culture and the Gaeltacht, Michael D. Higgins. Its primary purpose was to "manage the flow of visitors to the megalithic tombs of Newgrange and Knowth".
- 6 June – In the general election, Fianna Fáil won a plurality of seats and formed a coalition government with the Progressive Democrats. Bertie Ahern replaced John Bruton as Taoiseach, and Mary Harney of the Progressive Democrats became Tánaiste and Minister for Enterprise, Trade and Employment.
- 12 June – President Mary Robinson was appointed UN High Commissioner for Human Rights.
- 16 June – National University of Ireland, Maynooth came into existence with the commencement of the Universities Act, 1997.
- 25 June – Film makers arrived for two months of shooting at Curracloe, County Wexford to re-create the D-Day Normandy invasion scenes for Steven Spielberg's film Saving Private Ryan.

=== July ===
- 3 July – Taoiseach Bertie Ahern met United Kingdom Prime Minister Tony Blair for the first time.
- 6–11 July – Nationalist riots in Northern Ireland: There was violence in nationalist areas of Northern Ireland after an Orange Order parade was allowed down the Garvaghy Road by the Royal Ulster Constabulary in Portadown as part of the Drumcree conflict.
- 9 July – Counsel for Charles Haughey admitted that the former taoiseach accepted £1.3 million from businessman Ben Dunne.
- 20 July
  - The Irish Republican Army instituted a second ceasefire.
  - The National Famine Memorial was unveiled by President Mary Robinson in Murrisk, County Mayo.

=== August ===
- 31 August – The British ambassador to Ireland, Veronica Sutherland, led tributes to Diana, Princess of Wales, killed in Paris.

=== September ===
- 6 September
  - Thousands of people queued at the British Embassy in Dublin to sign condolences for Princess Diana. Three books of condolence were made available due to the large turnout. Taoiseach Bertie Ahern, Tánaiste Mary Harney, Minister for Foreign Affairs Ray Burke, the Fine Gael party's Nora Owen, and the Labour party's Ruairi Quinn all signed their condolences. Thousands of bouquets and cards were left at the gates of the embassy. Books of condolence were also made available at the Mansion House in Dublin and at City Hall in Cork.
  - Flags on state buildings flew at half mast as a mark of respect for Princess Diana on the day of her funeral.
- 7 September – A special service of remembrance for Princess Diana was held at St. Patrick's Cathedral in Dublin, attended by the president, Mary Robinson (on one of her final official engagements as president), and the taoiseach, Bertie Ahern.
- 12 September – Mary Robinson resigned as president to assume her new role as UN High Commissioner for Human Rights.
- 18 September – The converted Collins Barracks in Dublin re-opened to house the National Museum of Ireland's Decorative Arts and History collections.

=== October ===
- 7 October – Substantial all-party peace talks began in Northern Ireland.
- 10 October – At a Provisional Irish Republican Army General Army Convention held at Falcarragh, County Donegal, a majority supported the ceasefire.
- 31 October - Mary McAleese won the presidential election.

=== November ===
- 1 November – The Hepatitis C Compensation Tribunal Act, 1997, took effect.
- 7 November – Dick Spring confirmed that he was resigning as leader of the Labour Party.
- 11 November – Mary McAleese was inaugurated as the eighth President of Ireland, the first time in the world that one woman succeeded another as elected head of state.
- 13 November – Ruairi Quinn won the leadership of the Labour Party.
- 30 November – Eileen Costello O'Shaughnessy, a 47-year-old taxi driver from Galway, was killed in a violent attack while working. The crime was unsolved.
- Unknown date – IRA members opposed to the ceasefire, led by Michael McKevitt, met at a farmhouse in Oldcastle, County Meath, and formed a new organisation, Óglaigh na hÉireann, which became known as the Real Irish Republican Army.

=== December ===
- 27 December – The Loyalist Volunteer Force leader Billy Wright was shot dead in the Maze prison in Northern Ireland by members of the Irish National Liberation Army.

== Arts and literature ==
- 3 May – Ireland staged the Eurovision Song Contest, hosted by Ronan Keating and Carrie Crowley. The Irish entry, Mysterious Woman sung by Marc Roberts, came second.
- 30 June – The American animated comedy television series The Simpsons premiered on Network 2 beginning with the final episode of season 1 "Some Enchanted Evening".
- 4 July – Conor McPherson's play The Weir premièred at the Royal Court Theatre Upstairs in London.
- 13 July – Neil Jordan's film The Butcher Boy was released in Ireland.
- 24 November – The first episode aired of the RTÉ television programme, A Scare at Bedtime.
- 31 December – Jim Sheridan's film The Boxer was released, starring Daniel Day-Lewis.
- Raidió Teilifís Éireann rebranded its television channel Network 2 as "N2".
- Danny Osborne's Oscar Wilde Memorial Sculpture was unveiled in Merrion Square, Dublin.
- John Banville's novel The Untouchable was published.

== Sport ==
=== Association football ===
- Shelbourne won the FAI Cup for the fifth time.
- The first ever League of Ireland match to be broadcast live on television was from Tolka Park between Shelbourne and Derry City on Network 2.

=== Gaelic games ===
- Kerry won the National Football League, beating Cork 3–7 to 1–8 in the final.
- Kerry won the All-Ireland Senior Football Championship winners for the first time since 1986, following a 0–13 to 1–7 victory over Mayo in the final.
- Limerick beat Galway 1–12 to 1–9 in the National Hurling League final.
- Clare beat Tipperary by 0–20 to 2–13 in the All-Ireland Senior Hurling Championship final. It was their second title in three years.

=== Golf ===
- The Murphy's Irish Open was won by Colin Montgomerie (Scotland).

=== Snooker ===
- Ken Doherty became world snooker champion following an 18 frames to 12 victory over Stephen Hendry at the Crucible Theatre, Sheffield.

== Births ==
- 13 January – Tim O'Mahony, hurler (Newtownshandrum, Cork).
- 15 January – Alex Cardillo, actor.
- 1 April – Darragh Fitzgibbon, hurler (Charleville, Cork).
- 13 April – Kelly Thornton, actress.
- 14 May – David Griffin, hurler (Carrigaline, Cork).
- 25 August – Shane Kingston, hurler (Douglas, Cork).
- 7 November – Robbie O'Flynn, hurler (Erin's Own, Cork).
- 23 December – Mark Coleman, hurler (Blarney, Cork).
- 26 December – Alex Murphy, actor.

== Deaths ==
- 5 January – James Comyn, former Justice of the High Court of England (born 1921).
- 31 January – John Joseph Scanlan, second bishop of the Roman Catholic Diocese of Honolulu (born 1906).
- 2 February – Seán Ó Síocháin, former Gaelic Athletic Association president.
- February – Reg Ryan, association football player (born 1925).
- 17 April – Chaim Herzog, sixth President of Israel (1983–1993) (born 1918).
- 12 March – William Hare, 5th Earl of Listowel, peer and Labour Party (UK) politician (born 1906).
- 2 May – Robin Kinahan, Unionist politician and businessman (born 1916).
- 9 May – Thomas FitzGerald, Earl of Offaly (born 1974).
- 19 May – Mervyn Wall, novelist and dramatist (born 1908).
- 23 May – Noel Browne, politician, former cabinet minister (born 1915).
- 24 May – Edward Mulhare, actor (born 1923).
- 16 June – Michael O'Herlihy, television director (born 1929).
- 18 June – Julia Clifford, fiddle player and traditional musician (born 1914).
- 25 September – Jim Kemmy, Labour Party and Democratic Socialist Party TD (born 1936).
- 20 December – Jim Gibbons, former Fianna Fáil TD, Member of the European Parliament and cabinet minister (born 1924).
- 29 December – John Graham, Irish Republican Army activist in the 1940s (born 1915).

== See also ==
- 1997 in Irish television
