= 1991 in Northern Ireland =

- Centuries: 20th; 21st
- Decades: 1970s; 1980s; 1990s; 2000s; 2010s
- See also: 1991 in the United Kingdom; 1991 in Ireland; Other events of 1991; List of years in Northern Ireland

Events during the year 1991 in Northern Ireland.

== Incumbents ==
- Secretary of State - Peter Brooke

== Events ==
- 3 June - The British Special Air Service kills three Provisional Irish Republican Army (IRA) members in the Coagh ambush.
- 2 November - An IRA bomb explodes in Musgrave Park Hospital, Belfast, killing two British Army soldiers and injuring 11 other people.
- Roscoff Restaurant in Belfast becomes the first in Northern Ireland to be awarded a Michelin star.

== Arts and literature ==
- Brian Keenan publishes An Evil Cradling, an autobiographical account of more than four years as a hostage in Beirut.
- Michael Longley's collection Gorse Fires is published; it will win the Whitbread Poetry Award.

== Sport ==
=== Football ===
- Irish League

Winners: Portadown

- Irish Cup

Winners: Portadown 2 - 1 Glenavon

=== Motorcycling ===
- Robert Dunlop wins the 125cc race at the Cookstown 100, and the 125cc and Junior TT races at the Isle of Man TT.

== Deaths ==
- 17 October - J. G. Devlin, actor (born 1907).
- 13 November - Francis Blackwood, 10th Baron Dufferin and Claneboye (born 1916).
- November - George Otto Simms, Archbishop of Armagh.

=== Full date unknown ===
- Professor John Dundee, leading anaesthetist (born 1921).

== See also ==
- 1991 in England
- 1991 in Scotland
- 1991 in Wales
