= 1987 in Ireland =

- Centuries: 18th; 19th; 20th; 21st
- Decades: 1960s; 1970s; 1980s; 1990s; 2000s
- See also: 1987 in Northern Ireland; Other events of 1987; List of years in Ireland

Events from the year 1987 in Ireland.

== Incumbents ==
- President: Patrick Hillery
- Taoiseach:
  - Garret FitzGerald (FG) (until 10 March 1987)
  - Charles Haughey (FF) (from 10 March 1987)
- Tánaiste:
  - Dick Spring (Lab) (until 20 January 1987)
  - Peter Barry (FG) (from 20 January 1987 until 10 March 1987)
  - Brian Lenihan (FF) (from 10 March 1987)
- Minister for Finance:
  - John Bruton (FG) (until 10 March 1987)
  - Ray MacSharry (FF) (from 10 March 1987)
- Chief Justice: Thomas Finlay
- Dáil:
  - 24th (until 20 January 1987)
  - 25th (from 10 March 1987)
- Seanad:
  - 17th (until 3 April 1987)
  - 18th (from 25 April 1987)

== Events ==
=== January ===
- 1 January – The halfpenny coin was withdrawn from circulation.
- 20 January – Labour Party ministers resigned from the government because of disagreement over budget proposals.

=== February ===
- 19 February – A general election returned a Fianna Fáil minority government after the Fine Gael–Labour Party coalition collapsed. Charles Haughey became taoiseach by one Dáil vote. The new Progressive Democrats party won 14 seats.

=== March ===
- 11 March – Former taoiseach Garret FitzGerald resigned as leader of the Fine Gael party and was succeeded by Alan Dukes.
- 22 March – The Irish National Lottery was launched.

=== May ===
- 8 May – Loughgall ambush: The British Special Air Service killed eight Provisional Irish Republican Army (IRA) members and a civilian in Loughgall, County Tyrone.
- 9 May – Johnny Logan won the Eurovision Song Contest for Ireland with his own composition Hold Me Now, making him the only person to win the competition twice as a performer.
- 26 May – A referendum was held on the Single European Act. Nearly 70% voted in favour of the tenth amendment to the Constitution.

=== July ===
- 26 July – Stephen Roche won the Tour de France, the first Irish cyclist to do so.

=== September ===
- 6 September - Stephen Roche completed the Triple Crown of Cycling by winning the UCI Road World Championships.

=== November ===
- 8 November – Remembrance Day bombing: Eleven people were killed and 63 were injured by an IRA bomb during a Remembrance Day service in Enniskillen.
- 10 November – The funeral took place of broadcaster Eamonn Andrews.
- 29 November – Beaumont Hospital opened in Dublin.

=== December ===
- 5 December – Downpatrick and Ardglass Railway began public operation, the first Irish gauge heritage railway in Ireland.
- Undated – Cooley Distillery began producing Irish whiskey.

== Arts and literature ==
- U2 released The Joshua Tree album to international acclaim.
- Maeve Binchy's novel Firefly Summer was published.
- Roddy Doyle published his first novel, The Commitments, the first volume of The Barrytown Trilogy, about a group of unemployed young people on the north side of Dublin who start a soul band.
- Kíla, the folk/world music group, was formed in the Irish language secondary school, Coláiste Eoin in County Dublin.

== Sport ==
=== Association football ===
- 11 November – Ireland qualified for their first major international tournament when Scotland pulled off a shock 1–0 win in Sofia against Bulgaria. Gary Mackay scored the only goal with just three minutes left to put Ireland into the Euro 88 tournament in West Germany.

=== Cycling ===
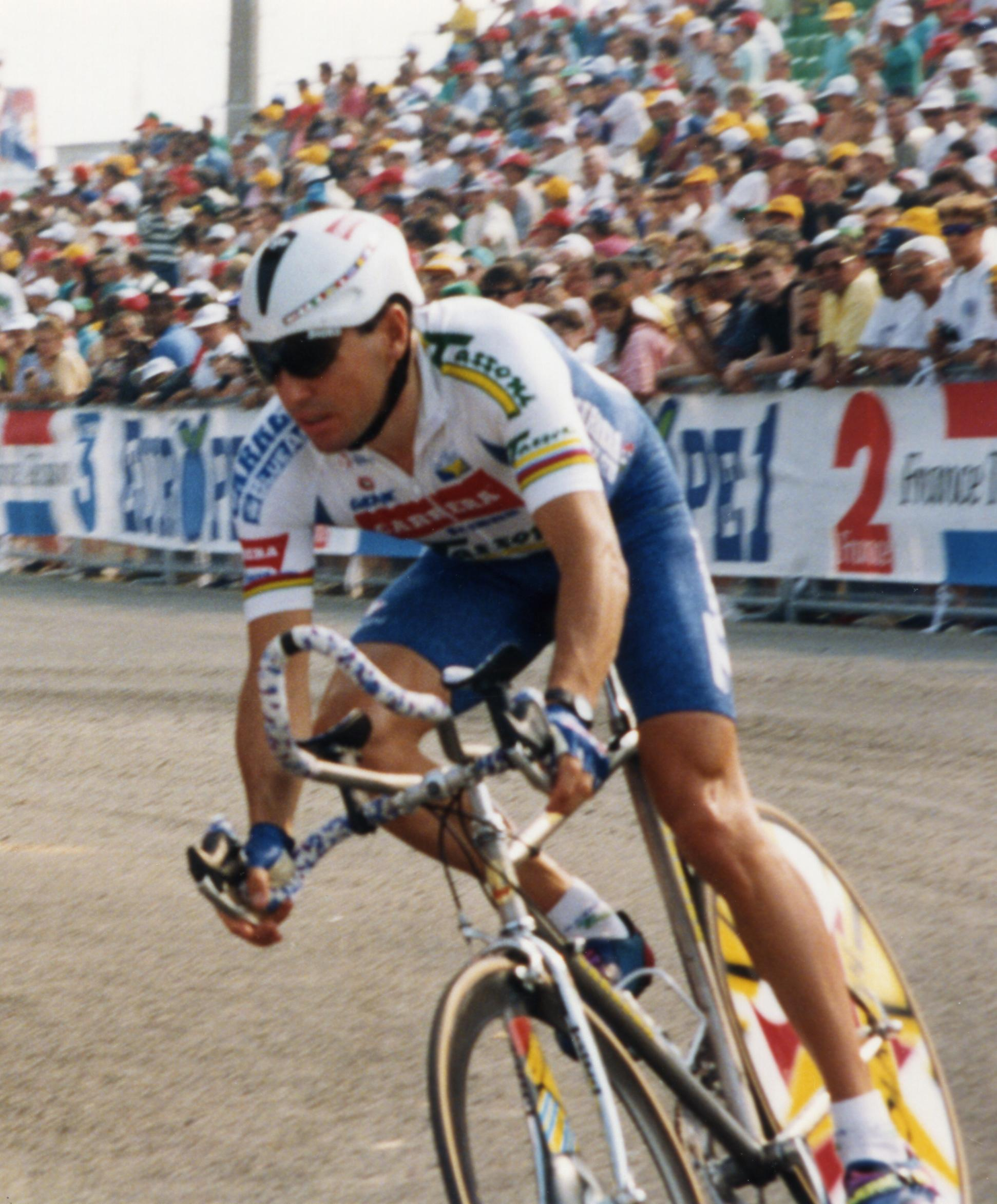
Stephen Roche

- 6 September – Cyclist Stephen Roche completed a remarkable treble by winning the Giro d'Italia, the Tour de France, and the World Championship.

=== Gaelic football ===
- Meath defeated Cork by 1–14 to 0–11 to win the All-Ireland Senior Football Championship.

=== Golf ===
- The Carroll's Irish Open golf tournament was won by Bernhard Langer (West Germany).

=== Hurling ===
- Galway defeated Kilkenny by 1–12 to 0–9 to win the All-Ireland Senior Hurling Championship.

== Births ==
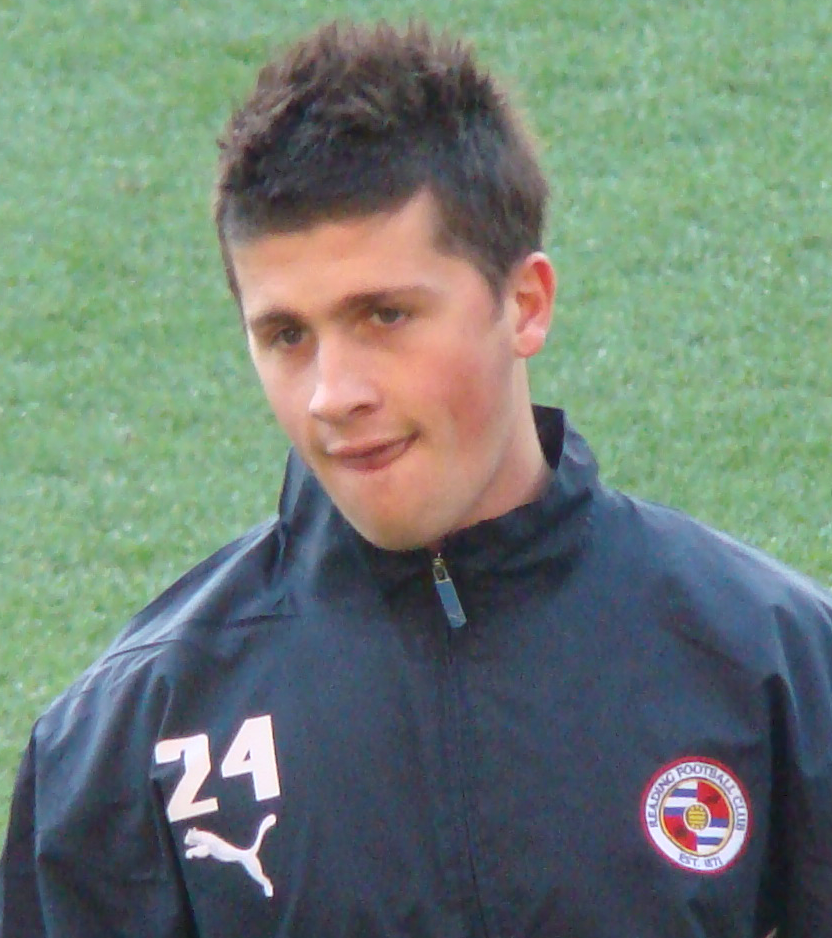
Shane Long, born in January.

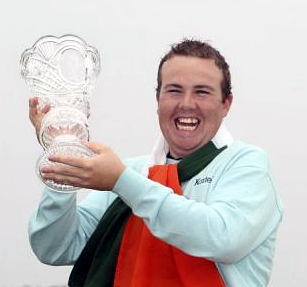
Shane Lowry, born in April.

- 2 January – Cathal Naughton, Cork hurler.
- 9 January – Nicola Coughlan, actress
- 22 January – Shane Long, association footballer.
- 24 January – Ruth Bradley, television actress.
- 30 January – Becky Lynch, professional wrestler.
- 4 February – Darren O'Dea, association footballer.
- 5 February – Denis McLaughlin, association footballer.
- 14 February – James Chambers, association footballer.
- 16 March – Diarmuid O'Carroll, association footballer.
- 2 April – Shane Lowry, golfer
- 13 April – Conor Sammon, association footballer.
- 23 April – Kelly Gough, actress.
- 12 May – Darren Randolph, association footballer.
- 20 May – Pa Cronin, Cork hurler.
- 21 May – Chris McCann, association footballer.
- 7 July – Diarmuid Connolly, Dublin Gaelic football and hurling player.
- 9 July – Jonny Hayes, association footballer.
- 28 September – Gary Deegan, association footballer.
- 2 June – Graeme Mulcahy, hurler (Kilmallock, Limerick).
- 2 October – Séamus Hickey, hurler (Murroe-Boher, Limerick).
- 11 October – Richie McCarthy, hurler (Blackrock, Limerick).
- 16 October – Eric McGill, association footballer.
- 9 November – Tom Condon, hurler (Limerick).
- 14 November – Brian Gleeson, actor
- 16 November – T. J. Reid, Kilkenny hurler.
- 13 December – Billy Clarke, association footballer.

== Deaths ==
- 2 January – Roger McHugh, professor, author and playwright (born 1908).
- 4 January – Eudie Coughlan, Cork hurler (born 1900).
- 14 January – Ewart Milne, poet (born 1903).
- January – Billy King, cricketer (born 1902).
- 8 April – Kevin McNamara, Archbishop of Dublin (born 1926).
- 19 April – Con Cremin, diplomat (born 1908).
- 22 April – Bill Hayes, association footballer (born 1915).
- 23 April – Oliver J. Flanagan, Fine Gael teachta dála (TD) and cabinet minister (born 1920).
- 27 April – Maurice Gibson, Northern Irish judge (born 1913).
- 8 May – Jim Lynagh, Provisional Irish Republican Army (IRA) member killed in an ambush by the British Special Air Service during an IRA attack on Loughgall Royal Ulster Constabulary station (born 1956).
- 22 June – John Hewitt, poet (born 1907).
- 30 June – Tommy O'Connor, association footballer.
- 20 July – Denis J. O'Sullivan, Fine Gael TD (born 1918).
- 18 October – Michael Lipper, Labour Party TD (born 1932).
- 25 October – Ivan Beshoff, last survivor of the Russian Potemkin mutiny (born 1882/4 in the Russian Empire).
- 29 October – Monk Gibbon, poet and author (born 1896).
- 5 November – Eamonn Andrews, broadcaster (born 1922).
- 25 November – James McDyer, Roman Catholic priest and community leader (born 1910).
- 8 December – Peadar Livingstone, priest and historian (born 1930).
- 9 December – Seán Brosnahan, Treasurer Irish National Teachers Organisation, member of the Seanad from 1961 to 1977 (born 1911).

=== Full date unknown ===
- Jimmy Warnock, boxer (born 1912).
