= 1990 in Ireland =

- Centuries: 18th; 19th; 20th; 21st
- Decades: 1970s; 1980s; 1990s; 2000s; 2010s
- See also: 1990 in Northern Ireland; Other events of 1990; List of years in Ireland

Events from the year 1990 in Ireland.

== Incumbents ==
- President
  - Patrick Hillery (until 2 December 1990)
  - Mary Robinson (from 3 December 1990)
- Taoiseach: Charles Haughey (FF)
- Tánaiste:
  - Brian Lenihan (FF) (until 31 October 1990)
  - John Wilson (FF) (from 13 November 1990)
- Minister for Finance: Albert Reynolds (FF)
- Chief Justice: Thomas Finlay
- Dáil: 26th
- Seanad: 19th

== Events ==
=== January ===
- 1 January
  - The Northern Ireland Fair Employment Act became law.
  - Ireland began a six-month European Presidency.
  - The town of Ennis celebrated its 750th birthday.

=== April ===
- 3 April – There was all-party support for the Criminal Justice Bill to abolish capital punishment for all offences and to replace it with lengthy prison sentences (although in practice the penalty for murder has always been commuted in Ireland since 1954).
- 26 April – The Labour Party selected Mary Robinson as its candidate for the November presidential election.

=== May ===
- 4 May – The second People In Need Telethon took place.

=== June ===
- 11 June – The Irish football team began their first appearance at a World Cup Final tournament with a 1–1 draw against England in Cagliari in Italy. Kevin Sheedy scored for Ireland, with Gary Lineker scoring for England.
- 17 June – Ireland's World Cup continued with a goalless draw against Egypt.
- 20 June – The Irish Pound coin was introduced into circulation to replace the note of the same denomination.
- 21 June – The Irish football team completed their World Cup group stage unbeaten and reached the last 16 group with a 1–1 draw against the Netherlands.
- 25 June – Ireland reached the World Cup quarter-finals by beating Romania on penalties after a goalless draw in the last 16 tie, in Genoa. As of 2022, this was Ireland's best World Cup result
- 30 June – Ireland were eliminated from the World Cup Final by a goal from Toto Schillaci in the quarter final match against the hosts, Italy, in Rome.

=== July ===
- 1 July – Half a million people gathered in Dublin to pay tribute to the Irish football team and to former South African President, Nelson Mandela. The football team had reached the World Cup quarter final in Italia '90 before being beaten by Italy, while Mandela accepted the Freedom of the City of Dublin, granted to him two years earlier, at an open-air ceremony outside the Mansion House.
- 2 July – Nelson Mandela addressed a joint session of both houses of the Oireachtas.
- 11 July – The Criminal Justice Act abolished capital punishment for all offences and replaced it with lengthy prison sentences.
- 24 July – The Irish Republican Army (IRA) killed three policemen and a nun in a bomb attack near Armagh.

=== August ===
- 24 August – Brian Keenan was released after 1,574 days in captivity in Beirut.

=== September ===
- September – Janet Catterall became the first woman in Ireland to be ordained as a priest in the Church of Ireland.
- 28 September – The centenary of People's Park in Dún Laoghaire, was celebrated.

=== October ===
- 23 October – The Square Tallaght shopping centre was opened in Dublin
- 24 October – The IRA killed six soldiers and a civilian in proxy bomb attacks in Derry and Newry.
- 25 October – Presidential candidate Brian Lenihan denied that he tried to contact President Hillery to stop the dissolution of the Dáil in 1982. This was in spite of a taped interview where he confirmed that he did.
- 29 October – Queen Beatrix and Prince Claus of the Netherlands began a three-day state visit to Ireland.
- 31 October – Tánaiste and Minister for Defence Brian Lenihan was dismissed from the government over the 1982 Hillery telephone call controversy.

=== November ===
- 7 November – Mary Robinson won the presidential election to become the seventh president of Ireland.
- 18 November – The pro-cathedral in Ennis was rededicated as a cathedral.
- 27 November – Mary Robinson gave her first television interview as president-elect on the children's entertainment programme, The Den. During a loud and chaotic conversation with the puppets, she confronted Dustin the Turkey for having accused her previously of having smelly feet and teased him about his poor performance in the election. She was asked by one of the Zig and Zag duo, "Mary, how much money do you have?"

=== December ===
- 3 December – Mary Robinson was inaugurated as the first female President of Ireland. Patrick Hillery retired after 14 years as Head of State.

== Arts and literature ==
- 28 March – An adaptation (by Frank McGuinness) of Anton Chekhov's Three Sisters opened at the Gate Theatre with Sinéad, Sorcha and Niamh Cusack in the title roles and their father Cyril as Dr. Chebutykin.
- 24 April – Brian Friel's Dancing at Lughnasa opened at the Abbey Theatre.
- May – Marita Conlon-McKenna's children's historical novel Under the Hawthorn Tree, the first in her Children of the Famine trilogy, was published by the O'Brien Press.
- August – Declan Hughes' first play, I Can't Get Started, opened (first in Dublin 10 November).
- 21 September – Jim Sheridan's film The Field premiered.
- 2 October – British television sitcom Only Fools and Horses was broadcast for the first time in Ireland with the series screening on Network 2.
- 13 November – Tugs, a British short lived children's television series began on Network 2.
- Shaun Davey's The Relief of Derry Symphony was composed.
- Maeve Binchy's novel Circle of Friends was published.
- Roddy Doyle's novel The Snapper, second of The Barrytown Trilogy, was published.
- John McGahern's novel Amongst Women was published.
- Colm Tóibín's first novel The South was published.
- CBI Book of the Year Awards for writers and illustrators of children's literature originated as Bisto Book of the Decade Awards.

== Sport ==
=== Association football ===
==== World Cup 1990 ====
===== Group stage =====
Ireland 1–1 England
Ireland 0–0 Egypt
Ireland 1–1 Netherlands

Ireland qualified for the knockout stage

===== Knockout stage =====
Ireland 0–0 (AET 5–4 PEN) Romania
Ireland qualified for the quarterfinal stage

===== Quarterfinal stage =====
Ireland 0–1 Italy
Ireland were knocked out at the quarterfinal stage

==== Domestic football ====
- St Patrick's Athletic won the League of Ireland.
- Bray Wanderers won the FAI Cup beating non-league St Francis in the first ever Lansdowne Road final.

=== Gaelic games ===
- Cork's football team won a second consecutive All-Ireland Senior Football Championship. The hurling team won the All-Ireland Senior Hurling Championship to complete a double for the county.

=== Golf ===
- Carroll's Irish Open was won by José María Olazábal (Spain).
- Ireland (David Feherty, Ronan Rafferty, Philip Walton) won the Dunhill Cup.

== Births ==
- 7 January – David Burke (Galway hurler).
- 2 February – Craig Breen, rally driver (died 2023).
- 7 February – Seán William McLoughlin, internet personality.
- 5 March – Ashling Thompson, camogie player.
- 17 March – Hozier, singer-songwriter.
- 29 May – Maeve O'Donovan, finalist in 2006/2007 RTÉ programme You're A Star.
- 2 June – Graeme Mulcahy, hurler (Kilmallock, Limerick).
- 12 June – Stephen McLaughlin, footballer.
- 15 September – Paul Townend, jockey.
- 22 September – Sorcha Richardson, singer-songwriter.
- 16 October – Sam Bennett, cyclist.
- 23 October – Niall Donoghue, hurler (died 2013).

== Deaths ==
- 21 January – Patrick Mulligan, Bishop of Clogher 1970–1979 (born 1912).
- 17 February – Brendan Corish, Labour Party TD and former leader, Cabinet Minister and Tánaiste (born 1918).
- 28 February – John O'Sullivan, Fine Gael TD and Senator (born 1901).
- 6 April – Peter Doherty, soccer player (born 1913).
- 8 May – Tomás Ó Fiaich, Cardinal Archbishop of Armagh and Primate of All Ireland 1978–1990 (born 1923).
- 12 May – John 'Tull' Dunne, Gaelic footballer, coach and administrator (born 1911).
- 11 June – Seosamh Mac Grianna, writer (born 1900).
- 12 June – Terence O'Neill, Fourth Prime Minister of Northern Ireland (born 1914).
- July – Peter Desmond, soccer player (born 1926).
- 3 August – Thomas Dunne, Fine Gael TD and MEP (born 1926).
- 19 October – Jerry Cronin, Fianna Fáil TD Cabinet Minister and MEP (born 1925).
- 26 October – Breandán Ó hEithir, journalist and broadcaster working in Irish and English languages (born 1930).
- 18 November – Fred Daly, golfer (born 1911).
- December – Harry Bradshaw, golfer (born 1913).

== See also ==
- 1990 in Irish television
