= 1999 in Ireland =

- Centuries: 18th; 19th; 20th; 21st
- Decades: 1970s; 1980s; 1990s; 2000s; 2010s
- See also: 1999 in Northern Ireland; Other events of 1999; List of years in Ireland

Events from the year 1999 in Ireland.

== Incumbents ==
- President: Mary McAleese
- Taoiseach: Bertie Ahern (FF)
- Tánaiste: Mary Harney (PD)
- Minister for Finance: Charlie McCreevy (FF)
- Chief Justice: Liam Hamilton
- Dáil: 28th
- Seanad: 21st

== Events ==
=== January ===
- 1 January – The Euro Currency officially entered circulation in the European Union (EU) Eurozone member area countries, then formally made its debut on European and the world financial markets.
- 13 January – Derek Hill became the eleventh honorary citizen of Ireland.

=== February ===
- 5 February – New legislation changed the name of the RSI Number to the Personal Public Service Number and expanded its use.

=== March ===
- 31 March – The Irish Land Commission was dissolved.

=== April ===
- April – Senator George Mitchell Peace Bridge opened across the Irish border.
- 27 April – The States of Fear television series, made by Mary Raftery for RTÉ, began broadcasting. Its revelations of a history of institutional child abuse led to questions being raised in the Dáil, an apology to victims from the Taoiseach, Bertie Ahern, and the appointment of a Commission to Inquire into Child Abuse in May.

=== May ===
- 21 May – Gay Byrne hosted his last Late Late Show after 37 years.
- 28 May – The county engineer for County Clare confirmed that the Latoon fairy bush, which was due to be cut down for the construction of the M18 motorway, would be spared after a preservation campaign led by folklorist Eddie Lenihan.

=== June ===
- 17 June – UEFA punished the Football Association of Ireland with a fine of £25,000 for not fulfilling a Euro 2000 qualifier against Yugoslavia.

=== June ===
- 4 July – Victoria Adams married David Beckham at Luttrellstown Castle, Clonsilla with the Bishop of Cork, Paul Colton, officiating. The wedding attracted much media coverage.

=== August ===
- 11 August – Ireland joined the world in watching the last solar eclipse of the millennium.
- 18 August - President McAleese attended a novena in Knock, County Mayo.

=== October ===
- 12 October – Peter Mandelson arrived in Belfast as the new Secretary of State for Northern Ireland.
- 20 October – President McAleese led tributes to the former taoiseach Jack Lynch who died aged 82.

=== November ===
- November – Remaining prohibition orders made under the Censorship of Publications Acts relating to contraception or termination of pregnancy were lifted.
- 28 November – A fireball tore itself apart in a massive explosion and bright flashes in the night sky over County Carlow. Golf ball-sized fragments were found later by a grandmother in Leighlinbridge, who remained anonymous; the meteorite was named after her town. The four stone fragments totalling 271.4g were classified as ordinary chondrites and were the first meteorites discovered in Ireland since 1865.
- 29 November – Ten designated ministers were appointed to the power-sharing Northern Ireland Assembly.

=== December ===
- December – The Millennium Bridge was opened in Dublin.
- 2 December
  - The Irish Government ratified changes to Articles 2 and 3 of the Constitution.
  - Direct rule from Westminster in Northern Ireland ended.
  - Foras na Gaeilge was established as an agency of The North/South Language Body under the terms of the Good Friday Agreement to promote the Irish language throughout the island of Ireland, assuming the roles of Bord na Gaeilge, An Gúm, and An Coiste Téarmaíochta, previously state bodies of the Government of Ireland.
- 13 December – The first meeting of the North/South Ministerial Council took place in Armagh.
- Inez McCormack of the UNISON trade union became the first woman President of the Irish Congress of Trade Unions.

== Arts and literature ==
- 10 February – Mark O'Rowe's play Howie the Rookie premièred at the Bush Theatre, London.
- 19 April – Sligo boyband Westlife released their first single, Swear It Again, the first of fourteen that went straight to number one in the UK Singles Chart.
- 6 October – Frank McGuinness's drama Dolly West's Kitchen premièred at the Abbey Theatre, Dublin.
- 1 November – Westlife released their first album, five singles from which went to number one in the UK Singles Chart.
- Colm Tóibín's novel The Blackwater Lightship was published.

== Sport ==
=== Association football ===
- St Patrick's Athletic won the League of Ireland for the third time in four years.

=== Gaelic football ===
- Meath beat Cork 1–11 to 1–8 to win their second All-Ireland Senior Football Championship in four years.

=== Golf ===
- Murphy's Irish Open was won by Sergio García (Spain).

=== Hurling ===
- Cork beat Kilkenny 0–13 to 0–12 to win the All-Ireland Senior Hurling Championship for the first time since 1990.

== Births ==
- 22 January – David Clifford, Gaelic footballer
- 18 May – Mark Travers, footballer
- 11 August – Mary Fitzgerald, Paralympic athlete
- 12 October - Ferdia Walsh-Peelo actor
- 15 December - Liah O'Prey actress
- 27 December - Finn Bennett actor

== Deaths ==
- 15 January – Robert Lowry, Baron Lowry, Lord Chief Justice of Northern Ireland (b. 1919)
- 28 January – Markey Robinson, artist (b. 1918)
- 8 February – Iris Murdoch, novelist and philosopher (b. 1919)
- 22 February – Pat Upton, Labour Party TD (b. 1944)
- 25 April – William McCrea, astronomer and mathematician (b. 1904)
- 25 April – Michael Morris, 3rd Baron Killanin, journalist, author, sports official and sixth president of the International Olympic Committee (b. 1914)
- 11 May – Birdy Sweeney, actor (b. 1931)
- 23 May – Cathal Gannon, harpsichord maker and fortepiano restorer (b. 1910)
- 15 June – Fred Tiedt, boxer (b. 1935)
- 17 July – Donal McCann, actor (b. 1943)
- 27 July – Malachi Martin, Roman Catholic priest and author (b. 1921)
- 21 August – Noel Larmour, cricketer and diplomat (b. 1916)
- 21 August – Maurice Gerard Moynihan, civil servant and writer (b. 1902)
- 24 August – Eithne Strong, poet
- 4 September – Raonaid Murray, victim of an unsolved murder (b. 1982)
- 13 October – Michael Hartnett, poet (b. 1941)
- 15 October – Josef Locke, tenor (b. 1917)
- 20 October – Jack Lynch, former Taoiseach and leader of Fianna Fáil (b. 1917)
- 14 November – Brian Ó Cuív, son-in-law of Éamon de Valera, Celtic scholar and author
- 23 November – Micheál Cranitch, Fianna Fáil politician, Cathaoirleach of Seanad Éireann in 1973 (b. 1912)
- 29 November – Michael O'Halloran, politician in the UK (b. 1933)
- 30 December – Tom Aherne, soccer player (b. 1919)

=== Full date unknown ===
- Manliff Barrington, motorcycle racer (b. 1910)
- Áine Ní Cheanainn, educationalist (b. 1907)

== See also ==
- 1999 in Irish television
