= 1988 in Ireland =

- Centuries: 18th; 19th; 20th; 21st
- Decades: 1960s; 1970s; 1980s; 1990s; 2000s
- See also: 1988 in Northern Ireland; Other events of 1988; List of years in Ireland

Events from the year 1988 in Ireland.

== Incumbents ==
- President: Patrick Hillery
- Taoiseach: Charles Haughey (FF)
- Tánaiste: Brian Lenihan (FF)
- Minister for Finance:
  - Ray MacSharry (FF) (until 24 November 1988)
  - Albert Reynolds (FF) (from 24 November 1988)
- Chief Justice: Thomas Finlay
- Dáil: 25th
- Seanad: 18th

== Events ==
- 1 January – Dublin city celebrated its millennium (see: Dublin Millennium)
- 11 January – The Social Democratic and Labour Party leader, John Hume, and Gerry Adams of Sinn Féin held a surprise meeting in Belfast.
- 27 January – The Irish internet country code top-level domain .ie was registered.
- 29 January – A major fire caused extensive damage to Kiltalown House (then unoccupied) in Tallaght, Dublin.
- 29 February – The first edition of the Irish Daily Star newspaper went on sale.
- 6 March – Operation Flavius: a Special Air Service (SAS) team of the British Army shot dead an unarmed Provisional Irish Republican Army (IRA) Active Service Unit (Danny McCann, Seán Savage, and Mairéad Farrell) in Gibraltar.
- 16 March – Milltown Cemetery attack: Three men were killed and 70 were wounded in a gun and grenade attack by the Loyalist paramilitary, Michael Stone, on mourners at Milltown Cemetery in Belfast during the funerals of the three IRA members who were killed in Gibraltar.
- 19 March
  - Corporals killings in Belfast: Two British Army corporals were abducted, beaten, and shot dead by Irish republicans after driving into the funeral cortège of IRA members killed in the Milltown Cemetery attack.
  - Five thousand people gathered for an anti-apartheid rally at the General Post Office in Dublin.
- 22 March – Tributes were paid to Aran Islands-born poet Máirtín Ó Direáin at his funeral in Dublin.
- 16 April – The National Lottery launched its national live draw.
- 15 June – The IRA killed six British soldiers in a bomb attack in Lisburn.
- 19 June – The Royal Canal in Dublin officially reopened for leisure purpose between Leixlip and Maynooth.
- 10 July – Dublin celebrated its official 1,000th birthday.
- 18 July – The South African anti-apartheid leader Nelson Mandela was awarded the freedom of the City of Dublin.
- 11 August – The Department of Health launched an information booklet as the number of AIDS cases increased dramatically.
- 28 August – Leopardstown Racecourse celebrated its 100th anniversary.
- 8 September – Teagasc, the Irish Agriculture and Food Development Authority, was formed, taking over the functions previously performed by the Agricultural Institute (An Foras Taluntais), An Chomhairle Oiliúna Talmhaíochta, and local committees of agriculture
- 12 September
  - Archbishop Thomas Morris resigned as Archbishop of Cashel and was replaced by Dermot Clifford.
  - A park named the Peace Garden was officially opened opposite Christ Church Cathedral in Dublin by Lord Mayor Ben Briscoe.
- 8 October – A tax amnesty produced the surrender of over £500 million in taxpayer payments.
- 17 October – The Independent Radio and Television Commission was established to regulate non-RTÉ radio and television services.
- 26 October – The legal case of Norris v. Ireland was decided by the European Court of Human Rights, ruling that the existence of laws in Ireland criminalising consensual gay sex was illegal.
- 16 November – Minister for Finance Ray MacSharry was appointed Ireland's new European Community Commissioner.
- 31 December – Pirate Radio closed down.

=== Full date unknown ===
- The National Archives of Ireland was formed under terms of the National Archives Act 1986 to take over the functions of the State Paper Office and the Public Record Office of Ireland.
- Gambling company Paddy Power was established by the merger of the 40 shops of three Irish bookmakers: Stewart Kenny, David Power, and John Corcoran.
- The Gay and Lesbian Equality Network was established in Dublin.
- The free gay magazine Gay Community News was published for the first time.

== Arts and literature ==
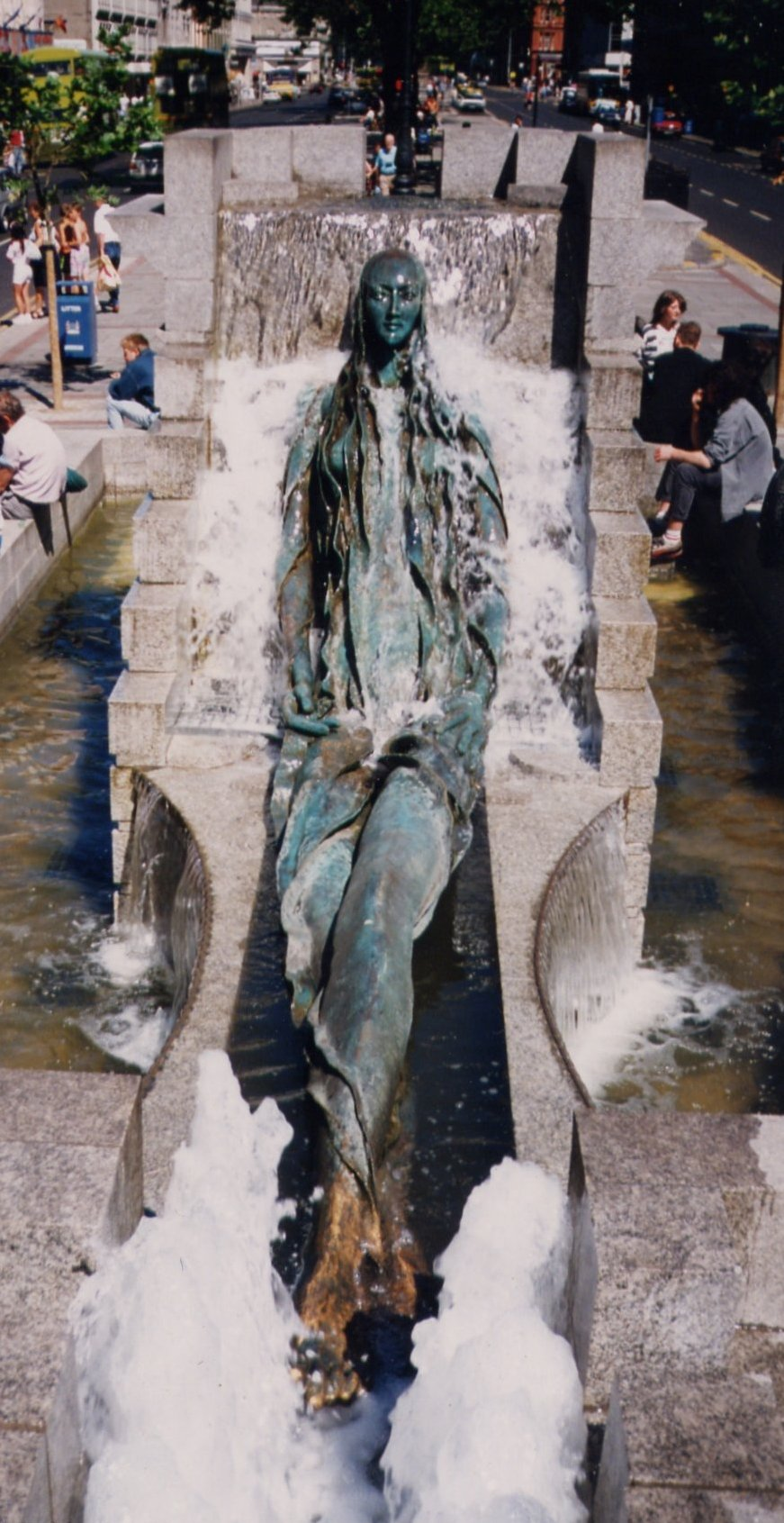
The Anna Livia Water Feature was unveiled in the centre of O'Connell Street in 1988

- 30 April – Ireland hosted the Eurovision Song Contest.
- 13 June – A statue of Molly Malone by Jeanne Rynhart was unveiled in Grafton Street, Dublin, to mark the city's millennium. The installations Anna Livia by Éamonn O'Doherty (agreed 7 March) and People's Island by Rachel Joynt were produced for the same commemoration.
- 17 June – The Anna Livia Water Feature was dedicated on O'Connell Street, Dublin by Lord Mayor of Dublin Alderman Carmencita Hederman and Dr. Michael Smurfit
- September – The television channel RTÉ 2 was relaunched as Network 2.
- 3 October – Australian television soap opera Home and Away was launched on Network 2 several months after airing in its country of origin.
- 11 October – Comedy series Nighthawks was first broadcast on Network 2.
- Toasted Heretic released their debut album Songs for Swinging Celibates.

=== Full date unknown ===
- The 14 bronze plaques constituting the Joyce Trail by artist Robin Buick were installed in Dublin

== Sport ==
=== Association football ===
- Ireland played in the European Championship finals for the first time.
- 12 June – Ireland celebrated a win over England 1–0 at the 1988 European Football Championship.

=== Cycling ===
- 13 March – Sean Kelly won the Paris–Nice cycle race for the seventh year in a row.
- 15 May – Sean Kelly won the Vuelta a España cycle race.

=== Gaelic football ===
- Meath beat Cork 0–13 to 0–9 in Croke Park to win a second consecutive All-Ireland Senior Football Championship title.

=== Golf ===
- The Carroll's Irish Open tournament was won by Ian Woosnam (Wales).
- 16 October – Ireland (Eamonn Darcy, Ronan Rafferty, Des Smyth) won the Dunhill Cup at St. Andrew's golf course in Scotland.

=== Hurling ===
- Galway beat Tipperary 1–15 to 0–14 in Croke Park to win a second consecutive All-Ireland Senior Hurling Championship title.

== Births ==
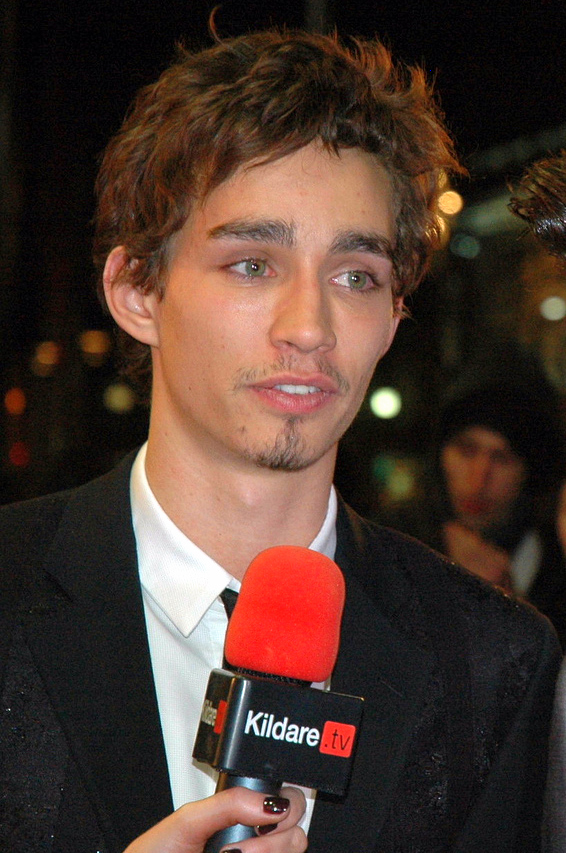
Robert Sheehan was born in January.

- 7 January – Robert Sheehan, actor.
- 15 January – Padraig Amond, soccer player.
- 23 January – Alan Power, soccer player.
- 29 January – Owen Garvan, soccer player.
- 13 February – Dave Rudden, young adult and fantasy writer.
- 21 February – Darren Forsyth, soccer player.
- 22 February – Robert Bayly, soccer player.
- 21 March – Kevin Guthrie, actor.
- 11 April – Ciarán Ó Lionáird, Olympic runner. (d. 2026)
- 2 May – Stephen Henderson, soccer player.
- 21 May – Adam Rooney, soccer player.
- 14 July – Conor McGregor, mixed martial artist.
- 25 July – Anthony Stokes, soccer player.
- 26 July – Grainne Leahy, cricketer.
- 13 September – Keith Treacy, soccer player.
- 22 September – Keith Quinn, soccer player.
- 11 October – Joe Canning, hurler (Portumna, Galway, Connacht).
- 28 October – Devon Murray, actor

== Deaths ==
=== January to June ===
- 1 January – Sister Philippa Brazill, nurse in Australia (born 1896).
- 1 January – Dan Spring, Gaelic footballer, trade unionist and Labour Party TD (born 1910).
- 15 January – Seán MacBride, former Clann na Poblachta TD, Cabinet Minister, Nobel Peace Prize winner (born 1904).
- 2 February – Frederick Blaney, cricketer (born 1918).
- 1 March – Tommy Breen, international soccer player (born 1912).
- 19 March – Máirtín Ó Direáin, poet (born 1910).
- 2 April – E. Chambré Hardman, photographer (born 1898).
- 10 May – Ciarán Bourke, musician, an original member of The Dubliners (born 1936).
- 5 June – Robert Dudley Edwards, historian (born 1909).
- 11 June – Nick O'Donnell, Kilkenny and Wexford hurler (born 1925).

=== July to December ===
- 17 July – Frank Carter, Fianna Fáil TD, Seanad member (born 1910).
- 17 September – Mick Cashman, Cork hurler (born 1931).
- 10 October – Sonny Hool, cricketer (born 1924).
- 27 October – Frank Devlin, badminton player (born 1900).
- November – Terry Leahy, Kilkenny hurler (born 1918).
- 7 December – Peter Langan, restaurateur (born 1941).
- 8 December – John Joe McGirl, chief of staff of the Irish Republican Army (born 1921).
- 21 December – Eithne Dunne, actress (born 1919).
- 22 December – Jack Bowden, cricketer and hockey player (born 1916).

=== Full date unknown ===
- Tommy Potts, fiddle player (born 1912).
- Ed Reavy, fiddle player and songwriter (born 1897).

== See also ==
- 1988 in Irish television
