= 2001 in Ireland =

- Centuries: 19th; 20th; 21st
- Decades: 1980s; 1990s; 2000s; 2010s; 2020s
- See also: 2001 in Northern Ireland; Other events of 2001; List of years in Ireland

Events from the year 2001 in Ireland.

== Incumbents ==
- President: Mary McAleese
- Taoiseach: Bertie Ahern (FF)
- Tánaiste: Mary Harney (PD)
- Minister for Finance: Charlie McCreevy (FF)
- Chief Justice: Ronan Keane
- Dáil: 28th
- Seanad: 21st

== Events ==
- January - Jacob's Biscuits switch colours with Digestive and Rich Tea between Red and Blue.
- 13 January - Dublin Bus discontinued its use of the distinctive green Bombardier bus type which had been used in the city for the previous 20 years, during which it became "synonymous with Dublin".
- 22 March – Ireland confirmed its first case of foot-and-mouth disease.
- 7 June – Voters rejected the Treaty of Nice in a referendum.
- 9 September – The National Museum of Ireland's Museum of Country Life at Turlough, County Mayo, was officially opened.
- 14 September – Ireland held a national day of mourning following the 9/11 terrorist attacks in the United States. The Irish government cancelled all sports, public functions, and entertainment, and also closed schools, businesses, and shops. President Mary McAleese said that the events are "an attack on the very foundations of human dignity" and left the people of Ireland "sad, shocked, sickened, grieving, disbelieving, outraged, frightened all at once."
- 14 October – The first multiple state funeral was held in honour of ten Irish Republican Army volunteers who were executed by the British for their part in the War of Independence.
- 23 October – The Provisional Irish Republican Army commenced disarmament after peace talks.
- 4 November – The Police Service of Northern Ireland was established.
- 17 November – The Gaelic Athletic Association voted to abolish its controversial Rule 21 which previously prevented members of the British Army and the Police Service of Northern Ireland from playing Gaelic games.
- 14 December – Irish euro coins becomes available through the postal service, An Post, and at bank branches. These "starter packs" contained nineteen coins worth €6.35 and could be purchased for IR£5.

== Arts and literature ==
- February–April – Conor McPherson's play Port Authority premièred in London and Dublin.
- 26 June – Two Old Master paintings from the Alfred Beit collection were stolen from Russborough House.
- 8 August – The first Irish transmission of the Australian soap opera Neighbours was shown on Network 2.
- 1 October – First season of Bachelors Walk on Network 2.
- Publication of Julian Gough's novel Juno & Juliet.
- Publication of John McGahern's last novel That They May Face the Rising Sun.
- Publication of Kate Thompson's children's novel The Beguilers.

== Sport ==
=== Show jumping ===
Kevin Babington, Peter Charles, Jessica Kurten and Dermott Lennon won the senior European Show Jumping Championships Team Gold medals.

=== Golf ===
- Murphy's Irish Open was won by Colin Montgomerie (Scotland).

== Births ==
- 5 January – Oisin McEntee, footballer
- 18 January – Niamh McCormack, actress
- 27 March – Gaby Lewis, cricketer
- 30 April – Nathan Collins, footballer
- 15 May – Jake O'Brien, footballer
- 8 August – Tyler Toland, footballer
- 19 October – Art Parkinson, actor

== Deaths ==
=== January to June ===
- 5 January – G. E. M. Anscombe, 81, analytic philosopher.
- 8 January – Jim Russell, 103, hurler, (Shamrocks, Cork senior team).
- 21 January – Joseph O'Conor, 84, actor.
- 14 February
  - Charles B. Fitzsimons, 76, actor and film producer.
  - Maurice Levitas, 84, academic and communist.
- 21 February – Desmond Leslie, 79, pilot, filmmaker and writer.
- 24 February – Andy Mulligan, 65, rugby union player (London Irish, British & Irish Lions, national team) and journalist.
- 8 March – Ninette de Valois, 102, founder of the Royal Ballet.
- 13 March – Norman Rodway, 72, actor.
- 20 March – Frank O'Reilly, 76, racewalker.
- 1 April – Brendan O'Reilly, 71, athlete, singer, songwriter, broadcaster and actor.
- 3 April – Butch Moore, 63, singer and showband icon.
- 18 May – Seán Mac Stíofáin, 73, English-born, Irish republican paramilitary leader.
- 1 June – Peter Corr, 77, association footballer (Dundalk, Preston North End, Everton, national team) and father of The Corrs members.
- 27 June – Michael Moynihan, 84, Senator (1973–1981), TD (1981–1987 and 1989–1992) and Minister of State (1982–1987).

=== July to December ===
- 4 July – Anne Yeats, 82, painter and stage designer.
- 10 July – Danny O'Brien, 62, boxer.
- 20 July
  - Seán O'Brien, 77, hurler (Glen Rovers, Cork senior team).
- 1 August – Joe Lynch, 76, actor.
- 11 August – Paul Cunniffe, 76, singer-songwriter.
- 18 August – Bill Cahill, 78, hurler (Graigue, Slieverue, Kilkenny senior team, Leinster).
- 21 August – John Kerins, 39, Gaelic footballer (St Finbarr's, Cork senior team, Munster).
- 27 August – John Joe Landers, 94, Gaelic footballer (Tralee, Austin Stacks, Kerry senior team, Munster).
- 31 August – Donal O'Sullivan, 70, Gaelic footballer (Lees, Cork senior team, Munster).
- 16 September – Patrick Cosgrave, 58, journalist and writer.
- 23 September – Kevin Boland, 83, TD (1957–1970), Minister for Defence (1957–1961), Minister for Social Welfare (1961–1966) and Minister for Local Government (1966–1970).
- 28 September – Joe 'Spud' Murphy, 78, founder of Tayto crisps
- 13 October – Ubi Dwyer, 68, anarchist.
- 17 October – Cornelius Casey, 72, association footballer (New York Americans, United States national team).
- 21 October – Bill Cody, 86, hurling selector (James Stephens, Kilkeny senior team) and administrator.
- 24 October – Eamon Kelly, 87, actor.
- 27 October – Seán Condon, 78, hurler (St Finbarr's, Cork senior team, Munster).
- 4 November – Denis Gallagher, 78, TD (1973–1989), Minister for the Gaeltacht (1977–1979 and 1982) and Minister of State (1880–1981, 1982 and 1987–1989).
- 8 November – Patrick Quinlan, 81, academic and Senator (1957–1977).
- 16 November – Patrick Lynch, 84, economist.
- 21 November – Paddy Skerritt, 75, golfer.
- 29 November
  - Mic Christopher, 32, singer-songwriter.
  - Dinny Lyne, 81, Gaelic footballer (Kilalrney Legion, Kerry senior team, Munster).
- 10 December – Freddie Anderson, 79, playwright and socialist.
- 12 December – Michael Torrens-Spence, 87, held commissions in the Royal Navy Fleet Air Arm, the Royal Air Force, the British Army, Ulster Special Constabulary and Ulster Defence Regiment.
- 14 December – Eoin Ryan, 81, Senator (1957–1987).
- 23 December – Mark Clinton, 86, TD (1961–1981), MEP (1979–1989) and Minister for Agriculture (1973–1977).

== See also ==
- 2001 in Irish television
