= 1989 in Ireland =

- Centuries: 18th; 19th; 20th; 21st
- Decades: 1960s; 1970s; 1980s; 1990s; 2000s
- See also: 1989 in Northern Ireland; Other events of 1989; List of years in Ireland

Events from the year 1989 in Ireland.

== Incumbents ==
- President: Patrick Hillery
- Taoiseach: Charles Haughey (FF)
- Tánaiste: Brian Lenihan (FF)
- Minister for Finance: Albert Reynolds (FF)
- Chief Justice: Thomas Finlay
- Dáil:
  - 25th (until 25 May 1989)
  - 26th (from 29 June 1989)
- Seanad:
  - 18th (until 5 July 1989)
  - 19th (from 1 November 1989)

== Events ==
- 2 January – The town of Dundalk celebrated its 1,200-year heritage.
- 12 February – Belfast solicitor Pat Finucane was shot dead by unionists.
- 20 March – Chief Superintendent Harry Breen and Superintendent Bob Buchanan of the Royal Ulster Constabulary were killed by the Provisional Irish Republican Army. An inquiry concluded in 2013 that a member or members of the Garda Síochána (police) probably colluded in the ambush.
- 21 March – Three Irish soldiers on United Nations duty were killed in a landmine explosion in southern Lebanon.
- 19 April – Judicial Separation and Family Law Reform Act provided for legal separation of married couples.
- 21 April – The People In Need Telethon was broadcast for the first time.
- 11 May – At a meeting in Malahide Castle between Taoiseach Charles Haughey and visiting Nicaraguan President Daniel Ortega, Haughey promised Ortega support at the European Council of Ministers for aid and investment for his country despite an earlier telephone call from U.S. secretary of state James Baker urging Haughey to take a tough position against Ortega over democratic standards in Nicaragua.
- 22 June – An order was signed creating the University of Limerick, the first university founded since the foundation of the state; later in the day Dublin City University was created.
- 29 June – Charles Haughey resigned as taoiseach, remaining on in a caretaker capacity.
- 19 August – Ten thousand people marched from Dublin city centre to the British Embassy calling for British withdrawal from Northern Ireland.
- 14 September – The biggest group parachute jump over an urban area in Ireland was performed by 14 parachutists at Drumcondra in Dublin from an altitude of three thousand feet to celebrate the centenary of the first parachute jump in Ireland in 1889, which was performed by Londoner Percival Spencer who jumped from two thousand feet in front of 25,000 people, also in Drumcondra.
- 24 September – At least 70 people were injured in a train crash in Claremorris.
- 19 October – Three of the Guildford Four were released from prison in London. Paul Hill was immediately re-arrested.
- 26 November – The first edition of The Sunday Business Post newspaper was published in Dublin.
- 21 December – Aer Rianta's five millionth passenger was presented with a holiday to Florida.
- Unknown date – The Irish Pride bakery was founded with the merger of Western Pride, Lydon House, Country Crust, and other bakeries.

== Arts and literature ==
- 4 April – The Windmill Lane Consortium said that if it got the franchise it would be on the air within 9 to 12 months with its television station, TV3.
- 1 September – Contemporary music radio station Atlantic 252 (part owned by RTÉ) went on air for the first time from the long wave Clarkstown radio transmitter in County Meath (with studios in Trim).
- 4 September – Independent pop music station Century Radio went on the air for the first time.
- 14 September – British children's stop-motion animated series Postman Pat premiered in Ireland on Network 2.
- 18 September – The television soap opera Fair City began on RTÉ One.
- 10 November – The film My Left Foot was released, directed by Jim Sheridan. Daniel Day-Lewis and Brenda Fricker won Academy Awards for their performances.
- MidWest Radio began broadcasting as a licensed station in County Mayo.
- John Banville's novel The Book of Evidence was published.

== Sport ==
=== Association football ===
- 11 October – Ireland beat Northern Ireland 3–0 in a World Cup qualifier in Dublin.
- 15 November – Ireland won 2–0 in Malta to secure qualification for the World Cup for the first time.

=== Gaelic football ===
- The All-Ireland Senior Football Championship final ended on a scoreline of Cork 0–17 Mayo 1–11

=== Golf ===
- The Carroll's Irish Open golf tournament was won by Ian Woosnam (Wales).

=== Hurling ===
- The All-Ireland Senior Hurling Championship final ended on a scoreline of Tipperary 4-24 Antrim 3–9.

== Births ==
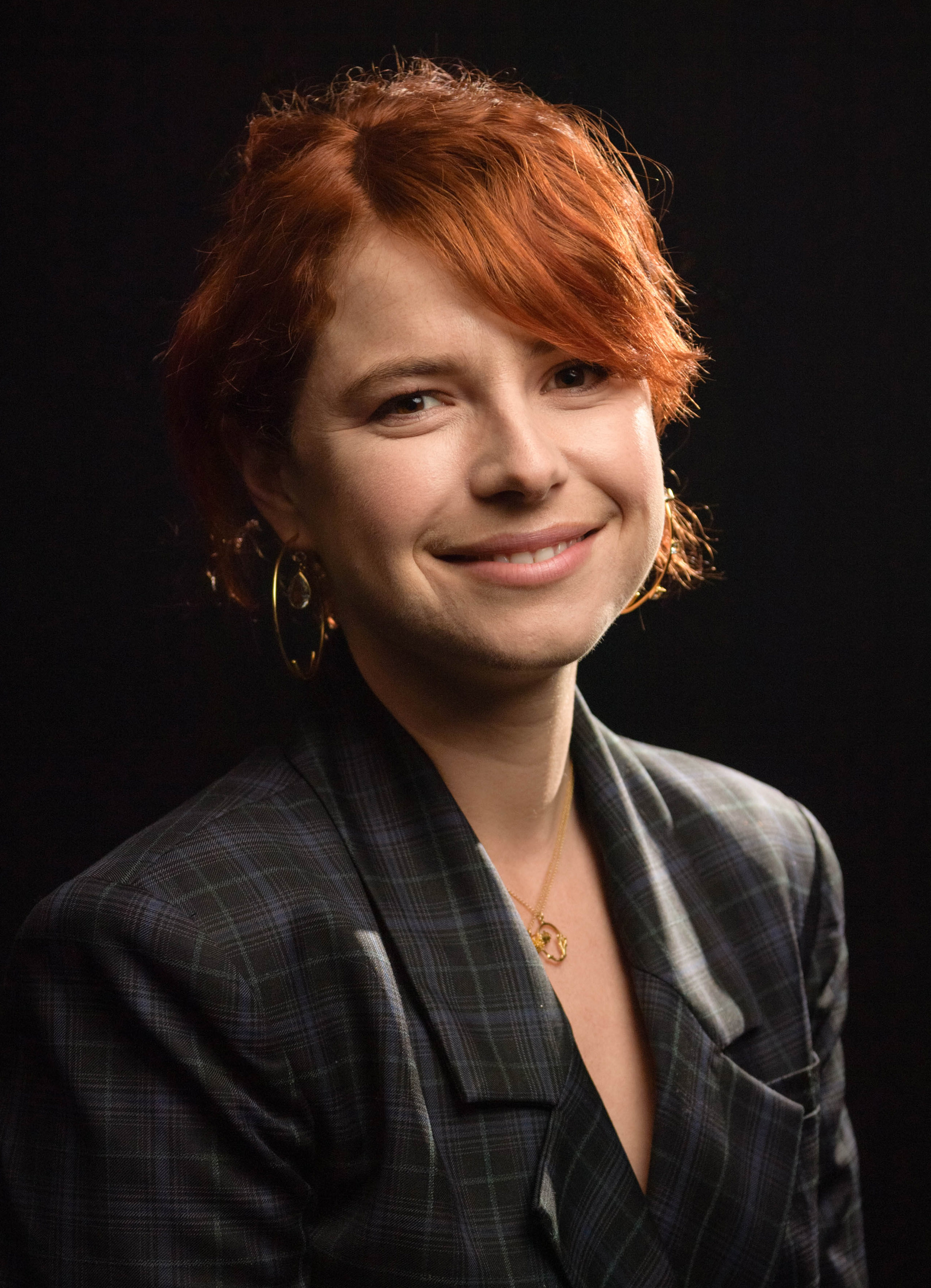
Jessie Buckley was born in December.

- 8 January – Ian Bermingham, association football player.
- 3 March – Barry O'Rorke, Gaelic footballer and hurler.
- 17 March – Patrick Curtin, Gaelic footballer (died 2015).
- 9 June – Chloë Agnew, singer.
- 12 June – Nickie Quaid, hurler (Effin, Limerick).
- 11 July – Rachael Blackmore, jump jockey.
- 4 August – Michael Murphy, Gaelic footballer.
- 14 October – Barry Hennessy, hurler (Kilmallock, Limerick).
- 28 December – Jessie Buckley, actress and singer.
- 31 December – Brian Gregan, sprinter and athlete.

== Deaths ==
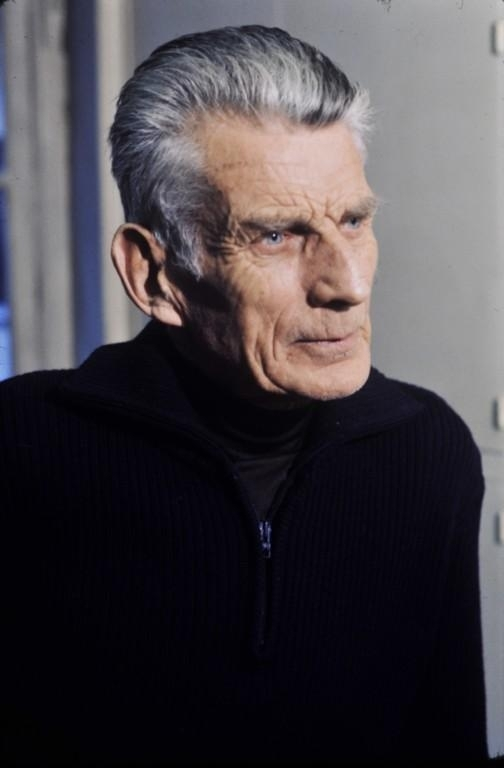
Samuel Beckett died in December.

- 24 January – Michael Scott, architect (born 1905).
- 27 January – Dónall Mac Amhlaigh, writer (born 1926).
- January – Jackie Wright, comedian (born 1905).
- 11 March – Simon Curley, cricketer (born 1917).
- 7 April – Frank Cluskey, former leader of the Labour Party (born 1930).
- 3 May – John Mackey, Limerick hurler (born 1913).
- 15 June – Ray McAnally, actor (born 1926).
- July – Eddie Gannon, association footballer (born 1921).
- 3 August – Dominic Behan, songwriter, novelist and playwright (born 1928).
- 10 August – H. Montgomery Hyde, barrister, author and Ulster Unionist MP (born 1907).
- 12 September – Seamus Twomey, twice chief of staff of the Provisional Irish Republican Army (born 1919).
- 4 November – Vivian Mercier, literary critic (born 1919).
- 14 December – Gerry Healy, British Trotskyist leader (born 1913).
- 22 December – Samuel Beckett, Nobel Prize in Literature 1969, playwright, novelist and poet (born 1906).
- Full date unknown – Hugh T. Baker, cricketer (born 1906).

== See also ==
- 1989 in Irish television
