= 1994 in Ireland =

- Centuries: 18th; 19th; 20th; 21st
- Decades: 1970s; 1980s; 1990s; 2000s; 2010s
- See also: 1994 in Northern Ireland; Other events of 1994; List of years in Ireland

Events from the year 1994 in Ireland.

== Incumbents ==
- President: Mary Robinson
- Taoiseach:
  - Albert Reynolds (FF) (until 15 December 1994)
  - John Bruton (FG) (from 15 December 1994)
- Tánaiste:
  - Dick Spring (Lab) (until 17 November 1994)
  - Bertie Ahern (FF) (from 17 November 1994 until 15 December 1994)
  - Dick Spring (Lab) (from 15 December 1994)
- Minister for Finance:
  - Bertie Ahern (FF) (until 15 December 1994)
  - Ruairi Quinn (Lab) (from 15 December 1994)
- Chief Justice:
  - Thomas Finlay (until 16 March 1994)
  - Liam Hamilton (from 22 March 1994)
- Dáil: 27th
- Seanad: 20th

== Events ==
- January – The Phoenix magazine revealed that priest and media personality Michael Cleary (who died last month) fathered at least one child with his long-term partner.
- 14 April – The Central Bank issued a new £5 note featuring Catherine McAuley.
- 30 April – Ireland won the Eurovision Song Contest with the song Rock 'n' Roll Kids. The stepdance show Riverdance performed its world premiere during the interval.
- 14 May – The National Famine Museum at Strokestown, County Roscommon was opened by President Mary Robinson
- 20 May – The fourth People In Need Telethon was held.
- 26 May – Jack Charlton, manager of the Irish football team since 1986, was awarded the freedom of Dublin City.
- 6 June – Irish D-Day Normandy landings veterans joined Allied leaders at a 50th commemorative ceremony on Omaha Beach.
- 18 June – Ireland's football World Cup campaign began with a 1–0 win over Italy, one of the favourites to win the tournament. Ray Houghton scored the winning goal.
- 24 June – Ireland's chances of progressing to the last 16 of the World Cup were left hanging in the balance when they lost 2–1 to Mexico, with John Aldridge scoring the consolation goal.
- 28 June – Ireland qualified for the next stage of the World Cup with a goalless draw against Norway.
- 4 July – Ireland were knocked out of the World Cup by the Netherlands when they lost 2–0 in Orlando.
- 26 July – The Minister for Education, Niamh Bhreathnach, pledged the introduction of free third-level education for everyone over the next three years.
- 31 August – The Provisional Irish Republican Army (PIRA) announced a complete cessation of military operations.
- 1 September – Transition Year was introduced mainstream to secondary schools.
- 6 September – Taoiseach Albert Reynolds, John Hume and Gerry Adams held a historic meeting at Government Buildings in Dublin and pledged their commitment to the democratic idea.
- 30 September – Taoiseach Albert Reynolds and members of the Government waited at Shannon Airport to greet Russian president Boris Yeltsin. He failed to leave the aircraft to meet them and created a diplomatic incident.
- 13 October – Loyalist paramilitary groups announced a ceasefire six weeks after the PIRA.
- 2 October – Ulster Television screened a Counterpoint programme, Suffer the Little Children, beginning the exposure of Catholic Church sex abuse cases, initially those of Brendan Smyth involving children.
- 28 October – The inaugural session of the Forum for Peace and Reconciliation took place in St. Patricks Hall, Dublin Castle.
- November – A statue of Queen Victoria which was erected in 1849 at Queen's College, Cork (now University College Cork), and subsequently buried under a lawn of the university in 1946 for safekeeping, was "exhumed" to be included in a 1995 exhibition celebrating 150 years of the university. Threats to bomb the statue were made to the organisers.
- 16 November – The Fianna Fáil-Labour government coalition collapsed.
- 17 November – Albert Reynolds resigned as Taoiseach. However, the Dáil was not dissolved.
- 19 November – Bertie Ahern was elected leader of the Fianna Fáil party.
- 15 December – John Bruton, leader of the Fine Gael party, became Taoiseach of the so-called "Rainbow" government in coalition with the Labour and Democratic Left parties.

== Arts and literature ==
- 3 January – One of Warner Bros.'s famous animated series Animaniacs made its debut on Network 2.
- 22 October – The Boyzone debut music album, Said and Done, was released in Ireland.
- Maeve Binchy's novel The Glass Lake was published.
- Emma Donoghue's first novel Stir Fry was published.
- Paddy Breathnach's film Ailsa (starring Brendan Coyle) was released.
- Colum McCann's short-story collection Fishing the Sloe-Black River was published.

== Sport ==
=== Association football ===
In the World Cup Finals in the United States, Ireland reached the last 16 before losing 2–0 to the Netherlands, but on the way picked up their first World Cup finals win inside 90 minutes with a 1–0 victory over Italy.

=== Athletics ===
- Eamonn Coghlan became the first person in the world over 40 years of age to run a sub-four minute (indoor) mile.
- 10 December – Catherina McKiernan won Senior Women's gold in the 1994 European Cross Country Championships, the inaugural event of the series.

=== Gaelic football ===
- 18 September – Down beat Dublin 1–12 to 0–13 in the All-Ireland Senior Football Championship final. It was Down's fifth All-Ireland senior title, and their second in four years.

=== Golf ===
- Murphy's Irish Open was won by Bernhard Langer (Germany).

=== Hurling ===
- Offaly beat Limerick 3–16 to 2–13 to win the All-Ireland Senior Hurling Championship final for the first time since 1985.

== Births ==
- 20 January – Seán Kavanagh, footballer.
- 12 April – Saoirse Ronan, screen actress (born in New York City).

== Deaths ==
=== January to June ===
- 1 January – Raymond Crotty, economist (born 1925).
- 19 February – Micho Russell, tin whistle player and collector of traditional music and folklore (born 1915).
- 23 February – Jackie Power, Limerick hurler and Gaelic footballer (born 1916).
- 7 May – Andy McEvoy, soccer player (born 1938).
- 12 May – Alfred Lane Beit, British politician, art collector and philanthropist, honorary Irish citizen (born 1903).
- 13 May – Duncan Hamilton, motor racing driver (born 1920).
- 21 May – Martin Doherty, member of Provisional Irish Republican Army, shot and killed (born 1958)
- 27 May – M. J. Molloy, playwright (born 1914).
- 17 June – Terence de Vere White, lawyer, novelist and biographer (born 1912).
- 27 June – William Conolly-Carew, 6th Baron Carew (born 1905).

=== July to December ===
- 19 July – Éilis Dillon, author (born 1920).
- 5 August – Gerry O'Sullivan, Labour Party (Ireland) TD, Minister of State and Lord Mayor of Cork (born 1936).
- 18 August – Martin Cahill, Dublin criminal, shot and killed (born 1949).
- 23 September – James Brophy, cricketer (born 1912).
- 6 December – Máire de Paor, archaeologist (born 1925).
- 20 December – Stephen Coughlan, Labour Party TD and Mayor of Limerick (born 1910).

== See also ==
- 1994 in Irish television
