= 1990 in Northern Ireland =

- Centuries: 20th; 21st
- Decades: 1970s; 1980s; 1990s; 2000s; 2010s
- See also: 1990 in the United Kingdom; 1990 in Ireland; Other events of 1990; List of years in Northern Ireland

Events during the year 1990 in Northern Ireland.

== Incumbents ==
- Secretary of State - Peter Brooke

== Events ==
- 1 January - The Northern Ireland Fair Employment Act becomes law.
- 24 July - The Provisional Irish Republican Army (IRA) kills three policemen and a nun in a bomb attack near Armagh.
- 24 August - Brian Keenan is released after 1574 days in captivity in Beirut.
- 6 September - RFA Fort Victoria bombing: RFA Fort Victoria, launched three months earlier at Harland and Wolff's shipyard, is boarded by an IRA unit in Belfast who plant bombs on board, one of which explodes, causing considerable damage.
- 24 October - The IRA kills six soldiers and a civilian in bomb attacks in Derry and Newry.

== Arts and literature ==
- 6 February - Marie Jones' The Hamster Wheel opens at The Arts Theatre, Belfast.
- 24 April - Brian Friel's Dancing at Lughnasa opens at the Abbey Theatre, Dublin.
- Ciarán Carson's Belfast Confetti poetry collection is published and wins the Irish Times' Irish Literature Prize for Poetry.

== Sport ==
=== Football ===
- Northern Ireland does not qualify for the 1990 world cup
- Irish League

Winners: Portadown

- Irish Cup

Winners: Glentoran 3 - 0 Portadown

=== Golf ===
- Ireland (David Feherty, Ronan Rafferty, Philip Walton) win the Dunhill Cup.

=== Motorcycling ===
- Robert Dunlop wins three MCN Supercup races, two races at the North West 200 and the 125cc race at the Isle of Man TT.

== Births ==
- 31 March - Lyra McKee, journalist (died 2019).

== Deaths ==
- 21 January - Patrick Mulligan, Bishop of Clogher 1970-1979 (born 1912).
- 12 February - Harold McCusker, Ulster Unionist Party MP (born 1940).
- 6 April - Peter Doherty, footballer (born 1913).
- 8 May - Tomás Ó Fiaich, Cardinal Archbishop of Armagh and Primate of All Ireland 1978-1990 (born 1923).
- 12 June - Terence O'Neill, Fourth Prime Minister of Northern Ireland (born 1914).
- 1 October - John Stewart Bell, scientist (born 1928).
- 15 October - David McCalden, Holocaust denier (born 1951).
- 18 November - Fred Daly, golfer (born 1911).

== See also ==
- 1990 in England
- 1990 in Scotland
- 1990 in Wales
