= 1996 in Ireland =

- Centuries: 18th; 19th; 20th; 21st
- Decades: 1970s; 1980s; 1990s; 2000s; 2010s
- See also: 1996 in Northern Ireland; Other events of 1996; List of years in Ireland

Events from the year 1996 in Ireland.

== Incumbents ==
- President: Mary Robinson
- Taoiseach: John Bruton (FG)
- Tánaiste: Dick Spring (Lab)
- Minister for Finance: Ruairi Quinn (Lab)
- Chief Justice: Liam Hamilton
- Dáil: 27th
- Seanad: 20th

== Events ==
=== January ===
- 24 January – The international body proposed six principles of democracy and non-violence ('the Mitchell principles') as conditions for entry to all-party talks in Northern Ireland.
- January (full date unknown) – The Israeli embassy to Ireland opened.

=== February ===
- 5 February – The Football Association of Ireland appointed Mick McCarthy as manager of the Irish football team.
- 9 February – A large Provisional Irish Republican Army (PIRA) bomb exploded in the London Docklands area, near Canary Wharf, injuring around forty, and marking the end of a 17-month IRA ceasefire.

=== March ===
- 11 March – The Hepatitis Tribunal opened in Dublin.

=== June ===
- 7 June – Detective Garda Jerry McCabe was shot dead by the PIRA in Adare, County Limerick.
- 17 June – The Fifteenth Amendment of the Constitution of Ireland was signed into law, repealing the absolute constitutional prohibition of divorce.
- 26 June – Crime reporter Veronica Guerin was shot dead in her car in Dublin.

=== August ===
- 4 August – The Proceeds of Crime Act, 1996 was signed into law providing for the seizure of the suspected proceeds of organised criminal activity.

=== September ===
- 11 September – A new £100 note depicting Charles Stewart Parnell was issued, with a red-and-brown front and a green-and-yellow back, to replace the 68-year-old £100 note.
- 25 September – The last Magdalene asylum closed, in Waterford.

=== October ===
- 11 October – The Criminal Assets Bureau Act, 1996 was signed into law providing for the creation of the Criminal Assets Bureau.
- 31 October – The new Irish language television station TnaG was launched.

=== November ===
- 29 November – It was revealed that Dunnes Stores paid £208,000 for an extension to Minister Michael Lowry's house.

=== December ===
- 13 December – On the opening day of a Dublin summit, EU leaders achieved a breakthrough in the argument over preparations for a single European currency.
- 23 December – French film-maker Sophie Toscan du Plantier was murdered outside her holiday home in Schull, County Cork.
- Undated
  - Restaurant Patrick Guilbaud was the first in Dublin to be awarded two Michelin stars.

== Arts and literature ==
- 1 February – Martin McDonagh's black comedy The Beauty Queen of Leenane was premiered by the Druid Theatre Company in Galway.
- 11 February – The television drama series Ballykissangel first aired. It was made by BBC Northern Ireland and set in a rural Irish community.
- 18 May – Ireland won the Eurovision Song Contest for the seventh time with The Voice, sung by Eimear Quinn and composed by Brendan Graham.
- 7 August – Marie Jones' play Stones in His Pockets was premiered in Belfast.
- 26 September – Enda Walsh's play Disco Pigs was premiered by the Corcadorca Theatre Company at the Triskel Arts Centre in Cork.
- 31 October – Ireland's first Irish language television station, Teilifís na Gaeilge (TnaG), was launched. On 3 November the soap opera Ros na Rún was first aired on the channel.
- 6 November – The film Michael Collins was shown in Cork and Dublin.
- The following novels were published:
  - Evening Class by Maeve Binchy.
  - Reading in the Dark by Seamus Deane.
  - Headbanger by Hugo Hamilton.
  - Lucy Sullivan Is Getting Married by Marian Keyes.
  - The Story of the Night by Colm Tóibín.

== Sport ==
=== Association football ===
- St Patrick's Athletic won the League of Ireland.
- Shelbourne won the FAI Cup.

=== Boxing ===
- 9 March – Steve Collins, "The Celtic Warrior", successfully defended his World Boxing Organization super middleweight title against Neville Brown at the Green Glens Arena, Millstreet, County Cork.

=== Gaelic football ===
- Meath beat Mayo in the All-Ireland Senior Football Championship final, after a replay, to win their first title since 1988.

=== Golf ===
- Murphy's Irish Open was won by Colin Montgomerie (Scotland).

=== Hurling ===
- Wexford beat Limerick in the All-Ireland Senior Hurling Championship final. It was their first senior All-Ireland since 1968.

=== Summer Olympics ===
- Swimmer Michelle Smith won three gold medals and one bronze in the Atlanta Olympics.

== Births ==
- 3 January – Cian Lynch, hurler (Patrickswell, Limerick)
- 24 January – Seán Finn, hurler (Bruff, Limerick)
- 26 January – Gary Cully, boxer
- 2 February – Paul Mescal, actor
- 5 May – Mark McKenna, actor and musician
- 29 May – Tom Morrissey, hurler (Ahane, Limerick)
- 13 June – Ruth Codd, actress
- 23 October – Lyra Valkyria, professional wrestler
- 28 October – Una Raymond-Hoey, cricketer
- 16 November – Brendan Murray, singer
- 6 December – Ann Skelly, actress
- 31 December – Barry Nash, hurler (South Liberties, Limerick)

== Deaths ==
- 8 January – Joyce McCartan, community activist.
- 12 February – James Camlin Beckett, historian.
- 18 February – Cathal Ó Sándair, writer (born 1922).
- 9 March – Ollie Walsh, Kilkenny hurler (born 1937).
- 5 April – Gerry L'Estrange, member of the Seanad, Fine Gael TD.
- 22 April – Molly Keane, novelist and playwright (born 1904).
- 24 April – Tomás de Bhaldraithe, Irish language scholar and lexicographer (born 1916).
- 9 June – Patrick Flynn, Liberal Party of Canada MP (born 1921).
- 10 June – Peter Raftery, diplomat.
- 26 June – Veronica Guerin, journalist, murdered by drug dealers (born 1958).
- 9 July – Christopher Casson, actor (born 1912).
- 16 July – Joe Dunn, Jacob's Award-winning documentarian for the Radharc television programme, broadcasting educator, publisher, author (born 1930).
- 6 August – Havelock Nelson, composer and pianist (born 1917).
- 18 August – Charles Mitchel, actor and television newsreader, read the first Telefís Éireann news bulletin in 1961 (born 1920).
- 25 August – Erskine Barton Childers, diplomat writer and broadcaster, son of President Childers (born 1929).
- August – Kathleen Mills, camogie player (born 1923).
- 11 November – Liam Naughten, Fine Gael politician, Cathaoirleach of Seanad Éireann from 1995 until his death. (born 1944).
- 24 November – Michael O'Hehir, sports commentator and journalist (born 1920).

=== Full date unknown ===
- Seán 'ac Dhonncha, traditional singer (born 1919).

== See also ==
- 1996 in Irish television
