= 1986 in Ireland =

- Centuries: 18th; 19th; 20th; 21st
- Decades: 1960s; 1970s; 1980s; 1990s; 2000s
- See also: 1986 in Northern Ireland; Other events of 1986; List of years in Ireland

Events from the year 1986 in Ireland.

== Incumbents ==
- President: Patrick Hillery
- Taoiseach: Garret FitzGerald (FG)
- Tánaiste: Dick Spring (Lab)
- Minister for Finance:
  - Alan Dukes (FG) (until 14 February 1986)
  - John Bruton (FG) (from 14 February 1986)
- Chief Justice: Thomas Finlay
- Dáil: 24th
- Seanad: 17th

== Events ==
=== January ===
- 2 January – The national offices of the Progressive Democrats were officially opened.
- 17 January – A centre lifting span of the Rice Bridge at Waterford collapsed into the River Suir during installation; however, the bridge was fully completed in the Spring.

=== February ===
- 11 February – Ireland's new association football team manager, Jack Charlton, arrived in Dublin.

=== March ===
- 18 March – Irish citizenship was conferred on Speaker of the United States House of Representatives, Tip O'Neill, for inspiring constitutional nationalists to launch an initiative for a new Ireland.
- 31 March – President Hillery and Mrs. Hillery started a four-day official visit to Austria. This was the first Irish state visit there.

=== April ===
- 8 April – Jennifer Guinness was kidnapped by three armed men for a IR£2 million ransom. She was the wife of banker, John Guinness, of the Guinness brewing family. She was rescued after eight days by gardaí (police) in Ballsbridge, Dublin.

=== May ===
- 4 May – Radiation from the devastated Chernobyl nuclear reactor in Ukraine reached Ireland.
- 6 May – The Divorce Action Group launched its campaign for the forthcoming divorce referendum in June.
- 21 May – Eighteen Old Master paintings from the Beit collection were stolen from Russborough House by Martin Cahill.
- 30 May – Horan International Airport, later known as Ireland West Airport, in County Mayo was officially opened. On 1 August, its principal promoter, Monsignor James Horan, parish priest of Knock, died suddenly in Lourdes, France (aged 75).

=== June ===
- 2 June – Fire destroyed Loreto Convent at St. Stephen's Green in Dublin; six nuns died in the blaze.
- 6 June – John Stalker was removed from the 'shoot to kill' inquiry.
- 12 June – Two giant pandas, Ming Ming and Ping Ping, arrived at Dublin Zoo.
- 26 June – Divorce referendum: A referendum was held to change the Constitution to allow divorce in Ireland. Voters rejected the proposal by 63% to 37%. This decision was later overturned in the 1995 referendum.
- 29 June – Ten police scuba divers from the Garda Sub Aqua Club completed a 33-hour international underwater swim of 57 nautical miles (106 km) from Holyhead in Wales to Dún Laoghaire in Ireland. Their sponsored swim contributed to the price of a divers' decompression chamber.

=== August ===
- 7 August – Clontibret invasion: A large gang of Northern Irish Loyalists crossed the Irish border overnight and attacked the village of Clontibret in County Monaghan. They assaulted and injured police and damaged property to protest against the Anglo-Irish Agreement, signed the previous November. Irish Special Branch detectives arrived and fired shots over the mob to disperse it. The deputy leader of the Democratic Unionist Party and member of the British parliament, Peter Robinson, was later convicted and fined for illegal assembly.
- 25–6 August – The remnants of Hurricane Charley struck Ireland. Dublin suffered its worst flooding since records began in 1880, and a new record for the greatest rainfall in one day was set when 200 millimetres of rain was measured at Kilcoole in County Wicklow. The River Dodder and River Dargle in County Dublin overflowed leading to flooding of 416 houses and 35 commercial premises.

=== October ===
- 13 October – Unleaded petrol goes on sale for new cars.
- 23 October – Disappearance of Philip Cairns: A 13-year-old boy disappeared on his way back to school after lunch; no trace of him was ever found.
- 30 October – The 20 pence coin entered circulation.

=== November ===
- November – Giant's Causeway and the Causeway Coast became the first Irish designated UNESCO World Heritage Sites.

=== December ===
- December (undated) – The Government banned South African food imports, about half the total of South African imports into Ireland, in protest against apartheid.
- 25 December – Dublin Airport was open on a Christmas Day for the first time.
- 31 December – American visa applications at the United States Embassy in Dublin rose by 25%. Thirty thousand people emigrated during 1986.

== Arts and literature ==
- 17 May – The Self Aid unemployment benefit concert was held in Dublin, featuring dozens of performers.
- Sigerson Clifford published the second edition of his poetry collection Ballads of a Bogman, including the first publication of "The Boys of Barr na Sráide".
- Bob Geldof published his autobiography, Is That It?
- Patrick McCabe published his novel, Music on Clinton Street.
- John Montague became the first occupant of the Ireland Chair of Poetry.
- The film Eat the Peach was released.

== Sport ==
=== Association football ===
- Ireland did not qualify for the 1986 FIFA World Cup.

=== Golf ===
- The Irish Open was won by Seve Ballesteros (Spain).

== Births ==
=== January ===
- 6 January – Paul McShane, association football player

=== February ===
- 10 February – Steven Foley-Sheridan, association football player.
- 17 February – Joey O'Brien, association football player.
- 24 February – Claire Hennessy, author.

=== March ===
- 1 March – Shane O'Neill, Cork hurler.

=== April ===
- 4 April – Stephen Quinn, association football player.
- 18 April – Conrad Logan, association football player.
- 30 April – Derek Doyle, association football player.

=== May ===
- 16 May – Andy Keogh, association football player.
- 19 May – Paul Byrne, association football player.
- 23 May – Shane McFaul, association football player.

=== June ===
- 3 June – Donal Skehan, singer and television presenter.
- 8 June – Michael Shields, Cork Gaelic footballer, Australian rules footballer.

=== July ===
- 2 July – Katie Taylor, boxer.
- 11 July – Gerard Nash, association football player.
- 31 July
  - Gary Dicker, association football player.
  - Deirdre Codd, Wexford Camogie player.

=== August ===
- 22 August – Stephen Ireland, association football player.
- 31 August – Colm Begley, Australian rules footballer.

=== September ===
- 10 September – Eoin Morgan, cricketer.

=== October ===
- 17 October – Simon Harris, Taoiseach.
- 19 October – Shaun Williams, soccer player.

=== November ===
- 20 November – Evan McMillan, association football player.
- 28 November – Tom O'Brien, National Hunt jockey (d. 2026)

== Deaths ==
=== January ===
- 4 January – Phil Lynott, singer-songwriter, lead singer of Thin Lizzy (born 1949).

=== February ===
- 10 February – James Dillon, former leader of the Fine Gael party, teachta dála (TD) and minister (born 1902).
- 12 February – James Joseph Magennis, British Royal Navy submariner awarded Victoria Cross for taking part in Operation Struggle in 1945 (born 1919).

=== March ===
- 1 March – Cahir Davitt, lawyer and judge (born 1894).
- 4 March – Edward MacLysaght, genealogist and writer (born 1887).
- 16 March – Pat Carroll, Offaly hurler (born 1956).
- 28 March – Eddie McAteer, Nationalist Party (Northern Ireland) member of parliament (born 1914).

=== April ===
- 26 April – Séamus McElwain, Provisional Irish Republican Army member killed in an ambush near Roslea by the Special Air Service (born 1960).

=== May ===
- 13 May – Peadar O'Donnell, Irish Republican socialist, Marxist activist and writer (born 1893).
- 22 May – James Christopher Branigan, known as "Lugs Branigan", police officer and boxer (born 1910).

=== July ===
- 20 July – Dermot Honan. licensed vintner, member of the Seanad from 1965 to 1973.

=== August ===
- 1 August – Monsignor James Horan, Roman Catholic priest (born 1911).

=== October ===
- 1 October – Seán Moore, Fianna Fáil party TD (born 1913).

=== Full date unknown ===
- Eddie Duffy, traditional Irish musician (born 1894).
- Cecil King, painter (born 1921).

== See also ==
- 1986 in Irish television
