= Ian Maher =

Irish footballer

Personal information
- Full name: Ian Maher
- Date of birth: 5 November 1985
- Place of birth: Dublin, Ireland
- Positions: Defender; midfielder

Youth career
- Cherry Orchard
- 2004: St Patrick's Athletic

Senior career*
Years	Team	Apps	(Gls)
2005–2006	St Patrick's Athletic	19	(0)
2006	→ Shamrock Rovers (loan)	8	(0)
2006	→ Kildare County (loan)	11	(0)
2006–2007	Cherry Orchard	?	(?)
2007–2008	Leonidas	?	(?)
2008	Monaghan United	17	(1)
- * Club domestic league appearances and goals

Ian Maher (born 5 November 1985 in Dublin) is an Irish footballer.

Maher is a midfielder who joined St. Pats from schoolboy side Cherry Orchard F.C. before the start of the 2004 season. After a series of impressive displays for the club's Under 21 side (which he captained), Maher was called up to the first team in 2005. He had spells with Shamrock Rovers and Kildare County on loan for the 2006 season to gain experience in the first division, but rejoined St. Pats at the end of the season. He rejoined Cherry Orchard in January 2007 helping them to the LSL title.

His performances for Joe Somerville's side attracted the attention of Leonidas who signed him in September 2007. On his return from the Netherlands he joined up with Monaghan United at the start of the 2008 season. Ian is now manager of Leinster senior league side Booth Road Celtic taking the reins in the summer of 2016.
