= Bernard Bergin =

Irish cricketer (1913–1985)

Personal information
- Full name: Bernard Francis Bergin
- Born: 20 September 1913; Dublin, Ireland
- Died: 17 June 1985 (aged 71); Dublin, Leinster, Ireland
- Batting: Right-handed
- Relatives: Stanley Bergin (brother)

Domestic team information
- Years: Team
- 1937: Ireland

Career statistics
Competition	First-class
Matches	1
Runs scored	16
Batting average	8.00
100s/50s	–/–
Top score	12
Catches/stumpings	–/–
- Source: Cricinfo, 27 October 2021

Bernard Francis Bergin (20 September 1913 in Dublin – 17 June 1985 in Dublin) was an Irish cricketer. A right-handed batsman, he played twice for Ireland against New Zealand in September 1937. One of those matches had first-class status, and was notable for being one of the few first-class matches to begin and end on the same day.
