= Neil R. Barrett =

Irish rugby union player

Neil Barrett
- Born: Neil Richard Joseph Barrett; 27 July 1992 (age 34) Dublin, Ireland
- Height: 1.93 m (6 ft 4 in)
- Weight: 108 kg (17 st 0 lb)
- School: Blackrock College
- University: Trinity College

Rugby union career
- Position: Flanker No.8 Centre
Senior career
Years	Team	Apps	(Points)
2010-present	Leinster	5	(5)

Neil Richard Joseph Barrett (born 27 July 1992, in Dublin) is an Irish rugby union player. He is a back-row forward who can play either blindside flanker or number 8 and has occasionally played at centre. He plays club rugby for Leinster in the Pro14 and Heineken Cup.

Barrett is a member of the Irish national U-20 team, having also played for his country at U-18 (schools) and U-19 level. He is renowned for his ball-carrying ability and strength, as well as crowd-pleasing "big hits" or impact tackles. He is also a solid line-out option and is considered a nearly complete back-rower due to his combativeness at the breakdown.

He has yet to establish himself as a starter for the senior Leinster team, but has made five appearances, as well as playing regularly for both the "A" and U-20 sides. While attending Blackrock College, he helped the school win both the Senior and Junior Cup. He was on the same cup-winning teams as fellow Leinster Rugby academy member and Ireland U-20 teammate Simon Hillary.
