= Dave McClements =

Northern Irish footballer

Personal information
- Full name: David McClements
- Date of birth: 14 January 1989 (age 37)
- Place of birth: Ballymoney, Northern Ireland
- Height: 5 ft 8 in (1.73 m)
- Position: Right midfielder

Team information
- Current team: Tobermore Utd
- Number: 7

Youth career
- 200?–2005: Institute
- 2005–2007: Sheffield Wednesday

Senior career*
Years	Team	Apps	(Gls)
2007–2008	Sheffield Wednesday	0	(0)
2007	→ Hinckley United (loan)	2	(0)
2008	→ Buxton (loan)	1	(0)
2008–2009	Coleraine	13	(4)
2009–2010	→ Institute	9	(3)
2010–??	→ Tobermore United	19	(6)
20??–	Tobermore United	??	(?)

International career^{‡}
2006	Northern Ireland U-17	?	(?)
2007	Northern Ireland U-19	?	(?)
2008	Northern Ireland U-20	?	(?)
- * Club domestic league appearances and goals as of 01:02, 17 November 2008 (UTC) ‡ National team caps and goals as of 01:02, 17 November 2008 (UTC)

David McClements (born 14 January 1989 in Ballymoney, County Antrim) is a Northern Irish footballer, who plays in midfield. He currently plays for Tobermore Utd and has played for his country at Under-17, Under-19 and Under-20 levels.

== Playing career ==
=== Club career ===
McClements began his career at Institute as a youth before joining English club Sheffield Wednesday where he was part of the club's youth academy. He was called into the senior squad at the start of the 2006–07 season in the Championship to ease the club's injury problems.

After being an unused substitute in a couple of league games, McClement made his first team debut as a 66th-minute substitute in a 4–1 defeat home defeat to Wrexham in the League Cup on 23 August 2006. He continued to play in the club's reserve team and in the Owls youth team in the Premier Academy League, while also becoming a regular unused substitute in the first team fixtures. On 31 January 2007 McClements was one of six players nominated in the shortlist for the Championship Young Apprentice Award Trophy.

At the end of the 2006-07 season he signed a one-year senior deal with the club. On 17 October 2007 he joined Conference North club Hinckley United on a month loan, where he made two appearances.

After spending most of the season as a regular in the reserve team, McClements was sent on loan to Northern Premier League Premier Division club, Buxton on 3 March 2008 for four weeks, but made just one appearance for the club. He failed to establish himself in the first team at Hillsborough and was released by Wednesday manager Brian Laws on 14 May 2008.

In November 2008 McClements returned to Northern Ireland in a bid to resurrect his career and after spending time training with IFA Premiership club Coleraine, he signed for them on 14 November. However Mcclements found himself going out on loan to his first club Institute, and then Tobermore United who he is now who plays for.

=== International career ===
McClements has been selected for Northern Ireland at Under-17, Under-19 and Under-20 level. In February 2006 he was called up to the Under-17 squad for a friendly against Luxembourg Under-17s.

In October 2007 he was part of the Under-19 squad that played three matches in a mini-tournament in Cyprus against the Under-19 teams from the host country, Austria and Slovakia.

In May 2008 he named in the Under-20 squad for friendlies against Luxembourg Under-20s and French club FC Metz.
