= National 1798 Rebellion Centre =

- Ionad Náisiúnta Éirí Amach 1798

- The centre in 2024

- Location within Ireland
- Established: 5 June 1998 (28 years ago)
- Location: Enniscorthy, County Wexford, Ireland
- Coordinates: 52°29′48″N 6°34′10″W
- Type: Heritage centre
- Public transit access: Enniscorthy railway station
- Website: 1798centre.ie

National 1798 Rebellion Centre (Irish: Ionad Náisiúnta 1798 Éirí Amach) is a heritage centre dedicated to the history of the 1798 Rebellion located in Enniscorthy, County Wexford in Ireland.

== Establishment ==
The centre is housed within a redeveloped Christian Brothers' school. It is funded from the Operational Programme for Tourism, and cost IR£2.6 million.

The centre was officially opened by Taoiseach Bertie Ahern on 5 June 1998, the bicentennial year of the 1798 Rebellion. Ahern used a pike to ceremonially cut the ribbon which was in the Wexford county colours of purple and gold.

== Exhibitions ==
Upon arrival, the visitor crosses 'the bridge of democracy' outside the building. The exhibitions cover a number of themes: Pre-Revolutionary Europe, the spread of revolution, the Irish context, the United Irishmen, the chain of battles nationally in May and June 1798, the French political and military connection, Vinegar Hill, and the aftermath of the rebellion. The exhibitions include dioramas and interactive displays. The centre closed for a period, reopening in 2013, to facilitate a refurbishment of displays.

It forms part of the 32 historical sites which form the Wexford Heritage Trail. The centre is leading a three-year programme to investigate the battlefield on Vinegar Hill, to identify the extent of the battlefield, locations of fighting, temporary structures, weapons, other artefacts, and the location of possible mass graves.
