= PEN/Edward and Lily Tuck Award for Paraguayan Literature =

- Country: (United States) (Awarded in the U.S.)
- Presented by: PEN America (formerly PEN American Center)
- Rewards: Prize to the author and the English translator

The PEN/Edward and Lily Tuck Award for Paraguayan Literature is awarded by the PEN America (formerly PEN American Center) to honor an author of a major work of Paraguayan literature and the English translator. The award was established by author Lily Tuck to assist with the translation of Paraguayan literature from Spanish or Guarani into English. Tuck won a National Book Award in 2004 for The News from Paraguay, which was set in 19th century Paraguay. Michael Orthofer of complete review called it "my new favorite American literary award," for its coverage of an overlooked area of world literature.

Candidates are nominated by Paraguayan publishers.

The award is one of many PEN awards sponsored by International PEN in over 145 PEN centers around the world. The PEN American Center awards have been characterized as being among the "major" American literary prizes.

== Winners ==
PEN/Edward and Lily Tuck Award for Paraguayan Literature
Year	Author	Title	Ref.
2010	Esteban Bedoya	El Apocalipsis según Benedicto	
2012	Delfina Acosta	Versos de amor y de locura	
2014	Raúl Silva Alonso	En Tacumbú	
2016	Nathalia María Echauri Castagnino	Doce Lunas Llenas: Poesias sobre la Divina Energia Femenina	
2018	Javier Viveros	Fantasmario	
2020	Liz Haedo	Pieles de papel	
