= Khawla Hamdi =

Tunisian novelist

- Born: July 12, 1984 (age 42); Tunis, Tunisia
- Education: Mines Saint-Étienne (industrial engineering degree and master's degree, 2008); University of Technology of Troyes (PhD in operations research, 2011)
- Occupations: Author; University Professor
- Notable work: In My Heart A Jewish Girl
- Religion: Islam

Khawla Hamdi is a Tunisian-born Arabic-language author born on July 12, 1984, in Tunis, Tunisia. She is a professor at the King Saud University in Riyadh, where she teaches Information technology and currently resides. She has written several best-selling novels in her literary career.

== Education ==
Hamdi has a degree in Industrial Engineering and received her master's degree in management from school of management in Saint-Étienne, France in 2008. In 2011, she obtained a Ph.D. of applied mathematics in operations research branch from University of Technology of Troyes, France.

== Entering the authorship field ==
Khawla Hamdi entered the writing world with the book "Ahlam al-Shabab", which reflects the memories of a Muslim girl, published in Arabic in 2006.

Thereafter, her second novel titled In My Heart A Hebrew Girl was published in Arabic in 2012. Inspired by a true story, the book is the story of a Tunisian Jewish girl who converted to Islam, after being influenced by an orphan Muslim girl and becoming interested in a young Lebanese who is one of the Lebanese resistance forces. This book one of the best-selling novels and has been reprinted more than 47 times so far.

Her next novel Ghorbat Al Yasmeen “The Expatriation of Jasmine” was published in 2015, which dealt with the problems faced by Arab refugees in France. An Tabqa “To Stay” was Hamdi's next book, published in 2016. The novel focuses on the problems of Arab refugees in Europe and their dual identities. Ayn Al Mafar “Where to Escape!” was published in 2018. This book scrutinize the revolutions that have taken place in the Arab world, especially Tunisia, as a story.

== Bibliography ==
=== Ahlam al-Shabab “Dreams of Youths” ===
It is Arabic novel about the desires and aspirations of young people and portrays the memories of a Muslim girl.

This book was published in Arabic in 320 pages in 2006.

=== Fi Qalbi Ontha Ebrya “In My Heart A Hebrew Girl” ===
The book Fi Qalbi Ontha Ebrya has been published in both Arabic and Persian. This book illustrates many contemporary issues in the Arab world such as misunderstanding Islam and the Hijab.

This book was published in Arabic in 388 pages in 2012.

=== Ghorbat Al Yasmeen “The Expatriation of Jasmine” ===
This book has been published in Arabic and in novel form. The novel discusses the challenges for Arab and Muslim refugees to adapt within French society. The main character in this novel is a Muslim girl who wears a head scarf and faces problems because of it in society.

This book was published in Arabic in 407 pages in 2015.

=== An Tabqa “To Stay” ===
This book has been published in Arabic and in novel form. The novel discusses the hardships of immigration for Muslims and whether it is worth it.

This book was published in Arabic in 383 pages in 2016.

=== Ayn Al Mafar “Where to Escape!” ===
This book has been published in Arabic and in novel form. The novel mainly scrutinizes the Tunisian revolution and the effects that these failed revolutions have on the people. This book has been published in Arabic in 431 pages in 2018.

== See also ==
- In My Heart A Hebrew Girl
- Rabee Jaber
- The Mehlis Report (book)
- Scriptural reasoning
