= List of PEN literary awards =

There are over 145 International PEN centres on the world, some of which hold annual literary awards. The PEN America Literary Awards have been characterized as being among the "major" literary awards in America.

== PEN America ==
Award	Description	Founded	Status
PEN Award for Poetry in Translation	To honor a poetry translation	1996	Active
PEN/Barbey Freedom to Write Award	Established in 2016, this award is designed to honor a writer imprisoned for his or her work. Its predecessor was PEN/Barbara Goldsmith Freedom To Write Award (see below).	2016	Active
PEN/Bellwether Prize	For a previously unpublished work of fiction that address issues of social justice.	2000	Active
PEN/Diamonstein-Spielvogel Award for the Art of the Essay	For a book of original collected essays	1990	Active
PEN/Distinguished Leadership Award	Individual award given out in 2018 and 2019, both times to lawyers. In 2018, an entertainment lawyer was honored "for exceptional work in support of PEN America and its mission to defend free expression", and in 2019, a First Amendment lawyer was honored for "his exceptional work handling high-profile litigation, media relations, and media legal issues, particularly his recent representation of [two] White House correspondent[s]".	2018	Active
PEN/Edward and Lily Tuck Award for Paraguayan Literature	To honor an author of a major work of Paraguayan literature and the English translator.	2012	Active
PEN/E. O. Wilson Literary Science Writing Award	For writing that exemplifies literary excellence on the subject of physical and biological sciences.	2011	Active
PEN/ESPN Award for Literary Sports Writing	To honor a nonfiction book about sports.	2010-2019	Inactive
PEN/ESPN Lifetime Achievement Award for Literary Sports Writing	To honor an author's body of work and long-term contributions to the field of literary sports writing.	2011-2019	Inactive
PEN/Fusion Emerging Writers Prize	Recognizes a promising young writer of an unpublished work of nonfiction that addresses a global and/or multicultural issue	2015-2016	Inactive
PEN/Jacqueline Bograd Weld Award	To honor a "distinguished biography possessing notable literary merit which has been published in the United States during the previous calendar year."	2008	Active
PEN/Jean Stein Book Award	To "a book that has broken new ground and signals strong potential for lasting influence."	2016	Active
PEN/John Kenneth Galbraith Award for Nonfiction	To a distinguished book of general nonfiction that possess the qualities of intellectual rigor, perspicuity of expression, and stylistic elegance conspicuous in the writings of author and economist John Kenneth Galbraith.	2007	Active
PEN/Joyce Osterweil Award for Poetry	In recognition of a book of poetry with high literary character by a new and emerging American poet of any age with the promise of further literary achievement.	1999-2019	Inactive
PEN/Laura Pels Theater Award	To a Grand Master of American Theater and a playwright in mid-career.	1998	Active
PEN/Nabokov Award	To writers, principally novelists, "whose works evoke to some measure Nabokov's brilliant versatility and commitment to literature as a search for the deepest truth and the highest pleasure".	2000–2008; 2017–	Active
PEN/Nora Magid Award for Magazine Editing	To "a magazine editor whose high literary standards and taste have, throughout their career, contributed significantly to the excellence of the publication he or she edits."	1993	Active
PEN/O. Henry Prize Stories	Annual American award given to short stories of exceptional merit.	1919	Active
PEN Open Book Award	To books published in the United States (but without citizenship or residency requirements) by "authors of color who have not received wide media coverage".	1991	Active
PEN/Phyllis Naylor Working Writer Fellowship	To a writer of children's or young-adult fiction of high literary caliber "at a crucial moment in their career to complete a book-length work-in-progress."	2001	Active
PEN/Ralph Manheim Medal for Translation	To a translator "whose career has demonstrated a commitment to excellence through the body of their work".	1982	Active
PEN/Robert J. Dau Short Story Prize for Emerging Writers	Recognizes 12 emerging fiction writers each year for their debut short story	2016	Active
PEN/Robert W. Bingham Prize	To "exceptionally talented fiction writers whose debut work—a first novel or collection of short stories...represent distinguished literary achievement and suggests great promise."	2002	Active
PEN/Saul Bellow Award for Achievement in American Fiction	To "a distinguished living American author of fiction whose body of work in English possesses qualities of excellence, ambition, and scale of achievement over a sustained career which place him or her in the highest rank of American literature."	2007–2018	Inactive
PEN Translation Fund Grants	Grants are awarded each year to a select number of literary translators	2003	Active
PEN Translation Prize	To outstanding translations into the English language.	1963	Active
PEN/Voelcker Award for Poetry	To an American poet whose distinguished and growing body of work to date represents a notable and accomplished presence in American literature.	1994	Active
PEN/Barbara Goldsmith Freedom to Write Award	Honours writers anywhere in the world who have fought courageously in the face of adversity for the right to freedom of expression. Succeeded by PEN/Barbey Freedom to Write Award (see above).	1987–2015	Inactive
PEN/Steven Kroll Award	"to acknowledge the distinct literary contributions of picture book writers."	2012–2014	Inactive
PEN/W.G. Sebald Award	To honor a promising writer who has published three works of fiction.	2010–2011	Inactive
PEN Emerging Writers Awards	To up-and-coming authors whose writing have been featured in distinguished literary journals, but haven't published book-length works.	2011–2011	Inactive
PEN/Amazon.com Short Story Award	Unpublished writers submit original short story manuscripts. Each manuscript will compete for a $10,000 cash grant and publication at Amazon.com and in The Boston Book Review. Award active for one year.	2000–2000	Inactive
Architectural Digest Award for Literary Writing on the Visual Arts	For literary writing on the visual arts. Award active for two years.	2000–2001	Inactive
Gregory Kolovakos Award	To a U.S. literary translator, editor, or critic "whose work, in meeting the challenge of cultural difference, extends Gregory Kolovakos's commitment to the richness of Hispanic literature and to expanding its English-language audience".	1992–2004	Inactive
Jerard Fund Award	Honors a work in progress of general nonfiction distinguished by high literary quality by a woman at the midpoint in her career. Presented every 2 years.	2001–2005	Inactive
Martha Albrand Award for the Art of the Memoir	For a first published memoir.	1998–2006	Inactive
Martha Albrand Award for First Nonfiction	For an American author's first-published book of general nonfiction.	1989–2006	Inactive
PEN/Katherine Anne Porter First Amendment Award	To a U.S. resident "who has fought courageously, despite adversity, to safeguard the First Amendment right to freedom of expression as it applies to the written word." The award succeeded the PEN/Newman's Own First Amendment Award	2008–2008	Inactive
PEN/Newman's Own First Amendment Award	To a U.S. resident who "fought courageously, despite adversity, to safeguard the First Amendment right to freedom of expression as it applies to the written word."	1993–2006	Inactive
Renato Poggioli Translation Award	For a translator at work on an English-language version of Italian literature.	1991–2000	Inactive
Roger Klein Award for Career Achievement	To a trade book editor every two years for "distinguished editorial achievement."	1971–2000	Inactive
Roger Klein Award for Editing	An honor "given [every two years] to an outstanding editor in trade hardcover publishing."	1971–2000	Inactive

== PEN/Faulkner Foundation ==
Award	Description	Founded	Status
PEN/Faulkner Award for Fiction	To the authors of the year's best works of fiction by living American citizens.	1981	Active
PEN/Malamud Award	Honors "excellence in the art of the short story."	1988	Active

== PEN Center USA ==
Award	Description	Founded	Status
Annual Literary Awards	Awards presented in 12 categories: Lifetime Achievement, Award of Honor, Freedom to Write, First Amendment, Award of Merit, Fiction, Creative Nonfiction, Research Nonfiction, Poetry, Children's and Young Adult Literature, Translation, Journalism, Drama, Teleplay, Screenplay, UC Press Exceptional First Book Award.	2000	Active

== PEN New England (today PEN America Boston) ==
Award	Description	Founded	Status
Laurence L. & Thomas Winship/PEN New England Award	To honor a New England author or book with a New England setting or subject.	1975	Active
PEN/Hemingway Award for Debut Novel	To a novel or book of short stories by an American author who has not previously published a book of fiction.	1976	Active
PEN Song Lyrics Award	to a singer songwriter, for Song Lyrics of Literary Excellence	2012	Active
Vasyl Stus Freedom-to-Write Award	Recognizes a writer persecuted for the peaceful expression of their views and whose courage in the face of censorship and oppression is exemplary.	(?)	Active
Susan P. Bloom Children's Book Discovery Award	Given to a New England resident for an unpublished work in one of four categories of children’s literature: picture books, novels, poetry, and nonfiction.	(?)	Active
Henry David Thoreau Prize	Awarded annually to a writer demonstrating literary excellence in nature writing.	(?)	Active
Friend to Writers Award	To one individual and one organization whose commitment to a culture of literature and the free and open exchange of ideas personifies PEN’s core mission.	(?)	Active
Howard Zinn Award	Presented to an American writer for speaking truth to power.	(?)	Active

== PEN Oakland ==
Award	Description	Founded	Status
PEN Oakland/Josephine Miles Literary Award	In order to "promote works of excellence by writers of all cultural and racial backgrounds and to educate both the public and the media as to the nature of multi-cultural work."	1989	Active
PEN Oakland/Censorship Award	Honors authors of literature of conscience who may have suffered censorship, efforts to discredit or failure to distribute/review their work based on philosophical or cultural content.	1997	Active
PEN Oakland/Lockett Lifetime Achievement Award	In honor of PEN Oakland Vice President Reginald Lockett who died in 2008.	2006	Active

== English PEN ==
Award	Description	Founded	Status
PEN Pinter Prize	Awarded annually to a British writer or a writer resident in Britain of outstanding literary merit who, in the words of Harold Pinter’s Nobel speech, casts an ‘unflinching, unswerving’ gaze upon the world, and shows a ‘fierce intellectual determination … to define the real truth of our lives and our societies’.	2009	Active
Golden PEN Award	A Lifetime's Distinguished Service to Literature is presented annually to a British Writer.	1993	Active
PEN Heaney Prize (delivered as a partnership with Irish PEN)	Awarded annually to a single volume of poetry by one author, published in the UK or Ireland, of outstanding literary merit that engages with the impact of cultural or political events on human conditions or relationships.	2024	Active
PEN Hessell-Tiltman Prize	Awarded annually for a non-fiction book of specifically historical content. Entrants, which may include first British translations, are to be books of high literary merit – that is, not primarily written for the academic market – and can cover all historical periods up to and including the Second World War.	2002	Active
PEN Ackerley Prize	To a literary autobiography of excellence, written by an author of British nationality and published during the preceding year, for which it is felt that J.R. Ackerley would have expressed enthusiasm.	1982	Active
PEN/Macmillan Silver Pen Award	Awarded annually to a collection of short stories.	1985–2001(?)	Inactive

== Irish PEN/PEN na hÉireann ==
Award	Description	Founded	Status
Irish PEN Award	To honour an Irish-born writer who has made an outstanding contribution to Irish Literature.	1999	Active
PEN Heaney Prize (delivered as a partnership with English PEN)	Awarded annually to a single volume of poetry by one author, published in the UK or Ireland, of outstanding literary merit that engages with the impact of cultural or political events on human conditions or relationships.	2024	Active

== Catalan PEN Club ==
Award	Description	Founded	Status
Free Voice Prize	Is awarded to an author who has suffered imprisonment or persecution because of their writing.	2010	Active

== Portuguese PEN Club ==
Award	Description	Founded	Status
Portuguese PEN Club Prize	Awards in four categories: Prose Fiction/Novel, Poetry, Essay and Literary Translation.	1980	Active

== International PEN ==
Award	Description	Founded	Status
Oxfam Novib/PEN Award	To recognise writers who have been persecuted for their work and continue working despite the consequences.	2001	Active
David T.K. Wong Prize for Short Fiction	Unpublished stories, written in English, submitted through any worldwide PEN center. Awarded bi-annually.	2000/1 to 2004/5	Inactive

== Sydney PEN ==
Award	Description	Founded	Status
Sydney PEN Award	Presented annually to a Sydney PEN member who has worked especially hard to promote the Centre’s values and the PEN Charter.	2006	Active
PEN Keneally Award	For recognizing an achievement in promoting freedom of expression, international understanding and access to literature.	2004	Active

== PEN Centre Germany ==
Award	Description	Founded	Status
Hermann Kesten Prize	Presented annually for outstanding efforts in support of persecuted writers.	1985	Active

== Hungarian PEN Club ==
Award	Description	Founded	Status
Janus Pannonius International Poetry Prize	Presented to an international poet whose oeuvre fits into the mainstream of European culture.	2012	Active

== Norsk PEN ==
Award	Description	Founded	Status
Ossietzky Prize	For outstanding achievements within the field of freedom of expression	2001	Active

== See also ==
- List of literary awards
