= In My Heart A Hebrew Girl =

2012 novel by Khawla Hamdi

In My Heart A Hebrew Girl (Arabic: في قلبي أنثى عبرية)
- Author: Khawla Hamdi
- Original title: في قلبي أنثى عبرية
- Language: Arabic
- Subject: Coexistence between religions
- Genre: Fiction, Romance novel
- Publisher: Kayan Publishing (In Tunisia)
- Publication date: 2012 in Arabic
- Publication place: Tunisia
- Pages: 386 in Arabic Edition
- ISBN: 9789938052107; Arabic Edition

In My Heart A Hebrew Girl is a novel by Khawla Hamdi, in which the author describes how she became acquainted with the protagonist of the story Nada. Initially, Khawla Hamdi publishes on a web site the story that she has heard, where she can communicate with the protagonist, Nada, to find out more. After hearing the story thoroughly and gathering the details, she turns it into a love story that happened between Nada as story hero and Ahmad as hero of the Lebanese resistance. A love between the Arab Jewish community and the Lebanese resistance community.

The novel impartially tells the true story of the real heroes, according to the author. The story of Rima, a Muslim girl, that after the death of her mother, adopted by Jacob and her wife Tanya and their two children, Sarah and Pascal, who are all Jewish. There is also the story of Nada, a Jewish girl, and Ahmad, a Muslim boy from the Lebanese Resistance Force, who tells of the reaction of Nada and Ahmad's sister, Samah, after Ahmed's disappearance. But soon the author abandons her impartiality and begins to provide evidence to persuade the reader to her religion.

== Jews in Djerba ==
The novel takes place on the island of Djerba, one of the Tunisian islands. The story of this island is interesting in its own way. In the distant past some Jews moved to this island after the kingdom of Nebuchadnezzar I -the king of Babylon and the commander of its armies- due to chaos in the east of the country. After settling on this enchanting island, they established their most famous synagogue, that now is the oldest in Africa. They also built many temples and shrines adjacent to muslim's mosques. The current number of Jews on the Djerba island does not exceed two thousand person, knowing that they are the descendants of the first immigrants to be mixed with the inhabitants of the land and that their survival on the religion of their fathers (Judaism) shows that Islam is not a hostile religion, otherwise this group of Jews had either been exterminated or expelled from the country.

== Synopsis ==
The novel centers on the true story of a Jewish girl named Nada, who lives in Tunisia with her Jewish family. As the novel depicts the full details of Nada's life and Rima's life, it shows how fate drives them together to meet. Rima, a girl less than 15 years old, is raised by a Jew after her mother's death, until this Jewish man realizes that his daughter is interested in wearing the Islamic veil because of Rima and he sees this as a threat to his daughter so he asks Rima to leave his house. Rima comes from Tunisia to Lebanon after being evicted from her Jewish godfather's home, where she meets Nada and works as a maid at her home. The story continues until at a night, a masked young man knocks on Nada's house door to help heal his friend Ahmad, who was injured in clashes between the Lebanese resistance and Israel. Ahmad is one of the Lebanese Resistance Forces fighting against the occupation regime of Zionist. Ahmad, who was wounded and taken to Nada's home, is taken care by Nada. As a result, Ahmad becomes interested in Nada and ignores religious and sectarian differences.

The story takes place in two areas: the first on the Djerba island in Tunisia and the second in the ancient city of Qana in southern Lebanon. Set in a Jewish neighborhood in southern Tunisia, the novel revolves around Rima, an orphaned Muslim girl raised in the shadow of her "uncle Jacob" Jewish family, whose beliefs begin to change and she tends to wear Islamic veil. Meanwhile, Uncle Jacob and his wife, Tanya, became angry with Rima and demand that she be removed from their children so that they will not be influenced by her beliefs about Judaism and Islam, so they send Rima to Lebanon and finally Rima meets the story hero Nada there.

In southern Lebanon, the novel deals with the life of Nada, a Hebrew girl entitled by this novel whose belongs to the Jewish religion, though Nada was raised in a Christian home but chose Jewish religion following her mother. Nada's life is deeply affected after meeting Ahmad. A Muslim boy belonging to the ranks of Lebanese resistance against the occupation regime of Israel.

The novel illustrates the relationship of Muslims with others, especially Jews, and also highlights the differences between Muslim women and Jewish women and their positions in the Quran. It also shows how Nada has been subjected to persecution and exile by her family after her conversion to Islam. As for Rima's fate, she is killed by a bombing in Qana when shopping at the market. The novel depicts the weakness of the Jewish religion by depicting terrorism, barbarism, and underestimating the status of women. The novel seems to convey the author's wishes and does not describe the reality of life, because in the Jewish community in Arab world, their relationships are largely limited to themselves.

== Comparison of religions ==
The author attempts to compare religions in blatant triumph for Islam, and in some parts deliberately attempts to make this comparison expressed by the protagonist Nada, for example throughout the story heard: Muslim prayer are different from Christian worship that performed loudly and by richness songs, but close to Jewish worship, especially when Jewish worshipers repeat the Bible sentences softly or in their minds without talk about it.

== See also ==
- Comparative religion
- Islamic–Jewish relations
- Les Belles de Tunis
- The Hakawati
- The Mehlis Report (book)
- Scriptural reasoning
