= Kareem James Abu-Zeid =

Egyptian-American translator, editor, and writer

Kareem James Abu-Zeid (born 1981) is an Egyptian-American translator, editor, and writer. He was born in Kuwait and grew up in the Middle East. He studied French and German language and literature at Princeton University, taking translation workshops under poets CK Williams and Paul Muldoon, and graduating summa cum laude in 2003.

He lived an itinerant life around Europe and the Middle East for several years, before moving to California for graduate studies. He obtained a master's degree and a PhD in comparative literature from UC Berkeley, with a dissertation focusing on modern poetry as spiritual practice. Following his PhD, he resumed a nomadic lifestyle for several more years, spending significant periods of time in southern India, before finally settling in New Mexico.

He has taught university courses in writing, language, literature, and philosophy in four different languages at Berkeley, Mannheim and Heidelberg, and currently works as a freelance translator from Arabic, French, and German into English, as well as a freelance editor of English-language texts. He also does a significant amount of work editing the translations of other translators, and currently serves as a mentor for emerging translators with the American Literary Translators Association. Abu-Zeid has the following books to his name:

- No One Will Know You Tomorrow by Najwan Darwish (Yale University Press, 2024), shortlisted for the PEN Heaney Prize
- Exhausted on the Cross by Najwan Darwish (NYRB Poets, 2021), foreword by Raúl Zurita.
- Songs of Mihyar the Damascene by Adunis (New Directions, 2019; Penguin Modern Classics, 2021), co-translated with Ivan Eubanks
- Confessions by Rabee Jaber (New Directions, 2016), winner of PEN Center USA's Translation Prize and finalist for the PEN Translation Prize
- Nothing More to Lose: Selected Poems by Najwan Darwish (New York Review Books, 2014), winner of the Northern California Book Award, longlisted for the National Translation Award and the Best Translated Book Award.
- The Iraqi Nights by Dunya Mikhail (New Directions, 2014)
- The Mehlis Report by Rabee Jaber (New Directions, 2013)
- The Palm House by Tarek Eltayeb (AUC Press, 2012)
- Cities without Palms by Tarek Eltayeb (AUC Press, 2009, runner-up for the Banipal Prize)

He contributes regularly to literary journals and websites such as Words Without Borders, Guernica, and Three Percent. He was the winner of PEN Center USA's 2017 Translation Prize. He has received a National Endowment for the Arts translation grant, literary residencies from the Lannan Foundation and the Banff Centre for the Arts, as well as Poetry magazine's 2014 translation prize, a Fulbright Fellowship and Fulbright Enterprise Scholarship in 2003/04 in Germany, and a CASA Fellowship at the American University in Cairo.
