= Irish PEN/PEN na hÉireann =

Irish literary organisation

- Founded: 1921; 105 years ago
- Founder: Lady Gregory
- Founded at: Roberts Café, Grafton Street, Dublin
- Headquarters: Irish Writers Centre, 19 Parnell Square, Dublin
- Location: Ireland
- Chair: Catherine Dunne (2024)
- Affiliations: Irish Writers Union; Aontas na Scríbhneoirí Gaeilge; Letters with Wings
- Website: irishpen.com
- Formerly called: Irish PEN

Irish PEN/PEN na hÉireann is an Irish literary organisation with the stated aims of promoting literature in and about Ireland both nationally and internationally, defending worldwide the right of writers to responsible freedom of expression as defined in the PEN Charter, and fostering international understanding through the appreciation of literature.

== History ==
The original Irish PEN was first established informally in 1921, by Lady Gregory, and formalised in 1934. In the words of writer Seán Ó Faoláin, "We have founded PEN to feel the rivalry, the emulation, the excitement of ideas, of criticism, of everything that belongs to the world of imagination and ideas . . . we recognize and fight for the intellectual fraternity of mankind."

In 2020, the organisation amalgamated with the Freedom to Write campaign to become Irish PEN/PEN na hÉireann.

The group has developed links with other writers' associations in Ireland, including the Letters with Wings project, Aontas na Scríbhneoirí Gaeilge and the Irish Writers Union.

== Membership ==
Irish PEN/PEN na hÉireann is a membership organisation. Full membership is open to writers (including poets, playwrights, editors, essayists, novelists, translators and bloggers) who "are Irish or resident in Ireland (North and South)", agree with the aims of the PEN Charter, and pay an annual fee (€40 in October 2025).

== Prizes ==
Irish PEN/PEN na hÉireann runs two annual awards: the Irish PEN Award and the PEN Heaney Prize (in partnership with English PEN).

=== Irish PEN Award ===
The Irish PEN Award, founded in 1999, is intended to honour an Irish-born writer who has made an outstanding contribution to Irish literature. Past recipients have included Anne Enright, John Banville, Joseph O'Connor, Maeve Binchy and Edna O'Brien.

=== PEN Heaney Prize ===
The PEN Heaney Prize is delivered by Irish PEN/PEN na hÉireann in partnership with English PEN and the estate of Seamus Heaney, after whom it is named. Founded in 2024, it is awarded annually to a poetry book of outstanding literary merit that engages with the impact of cultural or political events on human conditions or relationships.

The first winner was Susannah Dickey for ISDAL. The chair of Irish PEN/PEN na hÉireann, Catherine Dunne, said that ISDAL "directs our focus to the wider world in a way that chimes perfectly with PEN’s emphasis on human rights and the promotion of literature that serves to illuminate and engage."
