= Ella Lynch =

Ella Lynch may refer to:

- Ella Scott Lynch, Australian actress
- Eliza Lynch (1835–1886: also known as Ella Lynch), the mistress of Francisco Solano López, president of Paraguay
