= Mabel Pagano =

Argentine novelist (born 1945)

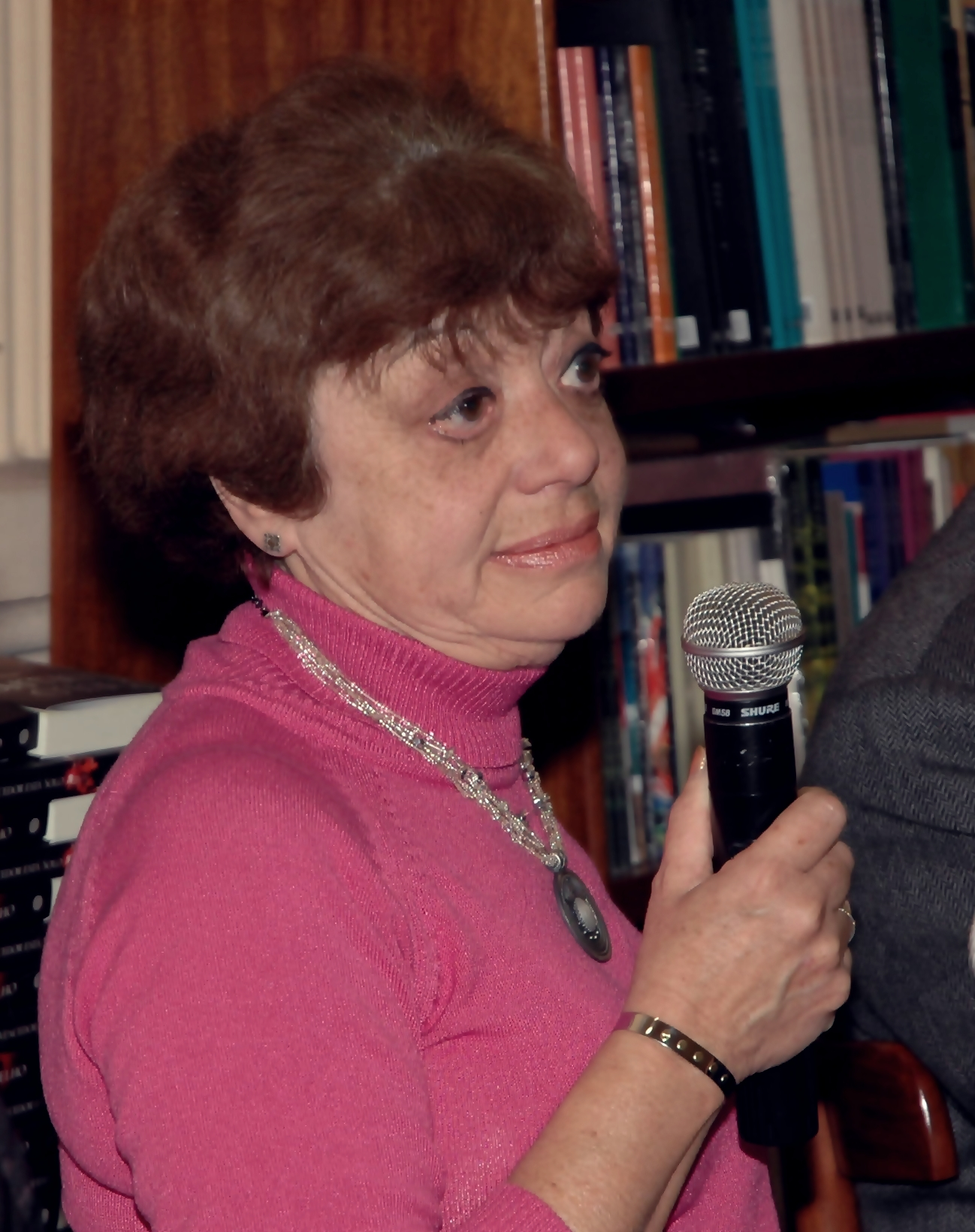
Image of Mabel Pagano

Mabel Pagano (born 1945, Lanus), is an Argentine novelist. She published her debut novel in 1976. Since then, she has published more than 20 books, including novels, short stories and books for children.

She is a multiple winner of the Premio del Fondo Nacional de las Artes. Among her noted works is the novel Martes del final, a work of historical fiction set in 19th century Paraguay that has Francisco Solano Lopez and Elisa Alicia Lynch among its principal characters.
