= The Mehlis Report =

The Mehlis Report may refer to:

- Mehlis report, United Nations' investigation into the 2005 assassination of Lebanon former prime minister Rafik al-Hariri
- The Mehlis Report (book), Labanese novel about the report
