= Martina Evans =

Irish poet and novelist (born 1961)

Martina Evans FRSL (born 1961) is an Irish poet and novelist who lives in London.

== Biography ==
Evans (née Cotter) was born in Burnfort, County Cork in 1961, the youngest of ten children. Her parents had a shop, bar and petrol pumps in the village. Her interest was in English literature but her parents wanted her to train as a radiographer. She trained in Dublin and after marriage, emigrated with her husband to London. She worked in Whittington Hospital for 15 years and did a degree in English and Philosophy with the Open University. She wrote intermittently during that period, but it was after her father's death in 1988 which released a burst of poetry that she turned to literature full-time. For some years she taught creative writing at institutions such as Birkbeck, University of London and the City Literary Institute, London.

She has judged various literary competitions including the London Arts Board Awards and the Listowel short story competition. She was Children's Book Editor at the Irish Post from 1998 to 2009. She is a Royal Literary Fund Advisory Fellow and reviews for the Irish Times.

Of her own creative process, Evans has said: "Memory is the muse" and "Time is the best editor".

== Works ==
=== Poetry ===
- Iniscarra Bar and Cycle Rest, Rockingham Press, 1995
- All Alcoholics are Charmers, Anvil Press Poetry, 1998
- Can Dentists be Trusted? Carcanet Press, 2004
- Facing the Public, Anvil Press Poetry, 2009
- Burnfort, Las Vegas, Anvil Press Poetry,2014
- The Windows of Graceland: New and Selected Poems, Carcanet Press, 2016.
- Now We Can Talk Openly About Men, Carcanet Press,2018
- American Mules, Carcanet Press. 2021.
- The Coming Thing, Carcanet Press. 2023.
- Drunken Driving, Carcanet Press. 2026.

=== Novels ===
- Midnight Feast, Sinclair-Stevenson 1996, Vintage 1998
- The Glass Mountain, Sinclair-Stevenson 1997, Vintage 1998
- No Drinking, No Dancing, No Doctors, Bloomsbury, 2001

=== Prose poems ===
- Petrol, Anvil Press, 2012
- The Glass Mountain, Bloom Books, 2013

== Awards and honours ==
- 1995 Betty Trask Award for Midnight Feast
- 1999 Arts Council England award for No Drinking, No Dancing, No Doctors
- 2011 International Premio Piero Ciampi prize for poetry for Facing the Public
- 2015 Grant for the Arts Award for the narrative poem Mountainy Men (later published in American Mules)
- In 2018 Now We Can Talk Openly About Men was a Book of the Year for The Observer, The Times Literary Supplement and the Irish Times
- In 2019 Now We Can Talk Openly About Men was shortlisted for the Poetry Now Award, the Pigott Poetry Prize and the Roehampton Poetry Prize
- 2022 Pigott Poetry Prize for American Mules
- In 2024 Evans was elected Fellow of the Royal Society of Literature
- In 2024 The Coming Thing was shortlisted for the PEN Heaney Prize
