= Irish PEN Award =

Irish literary award

Irish PEN Award for Literature
- Description: Outstanding contribution to Irish literature by an Irish-born writer
- Country: Ireland
- Presented by: Irish PEN / PEN na hÉireann
- Reward: Honor for significant body of work
- Website: www.irishpen.com

Irish PEN Award for Literature is an annual literary award presented by Irish PEN/PEN na hÉireann since 1999. Its intent is to honour an Irish-born writer who has made an outstanding contribution to Irish literature. The award is for a significant body of work and is open to novelists, playwrights, poets, and scriptwriters.

In 2012, the award was presented to novelist Joseph O'Connor by the President of Ireland, Michael D. Higgins.

The award is one of many PEN awards sponsored by PEN affiliates in over 145 PEN centres around the world.

== Recipients ==
- 1999: John B. Keane
- 2000: Brian Friel
- 2001: Edna O'Brien
- 2002: William Trevor
- 2003: John McGahern
- 2004: Neil Jordan
- 2005: Seamus Heaney
- 2006: Jennifer Johnston
- 2007: Maeve Binchy
- 2008: Thomas Kilroy
- 2009: Roddy Doyle
- 2010: Brendan Kennelly
- 2011: Colm Tóibín
- 2012: Joseph O'Connor
- 2013: John Banville
- 2014: Frank McGuinness
- 2015: Éilís Ní Dhuibhne
- 2017: Anne Enright
- 2018: Catherine Dunne
- 2019: Eavan Boland
