= Patrick McGuinness =

British academic, critic, novelist, and poet

Patrick McGuinness FRSL FLSW
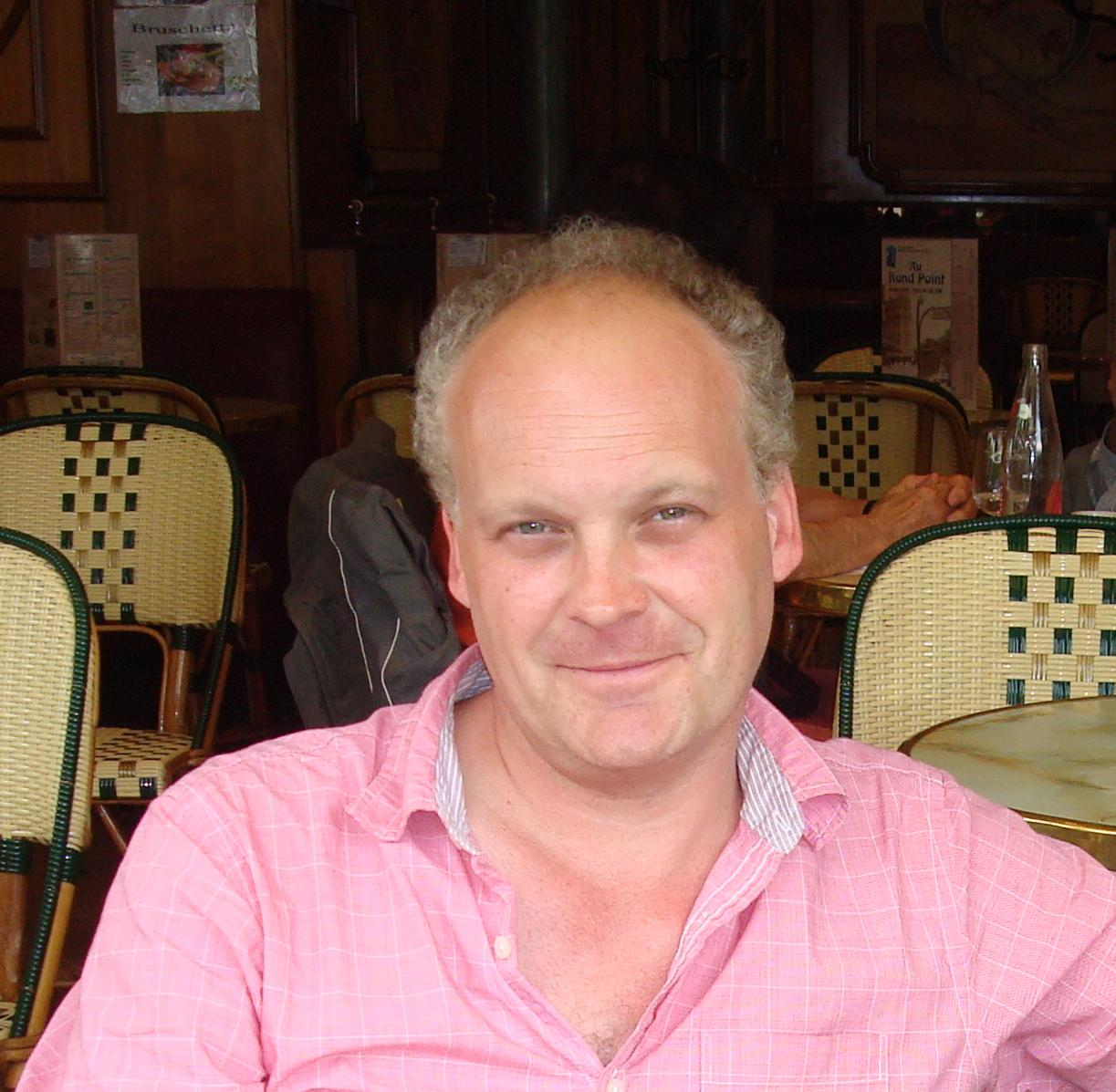
- McGuinness in Paris
- Born: 2 June 1968 (age 58); Tunisia
- Education: University of Cambridge; University of York; University of Oxford
- Occupations: Poet, novelist, academic, literary critic
- Children: 2

Patrick McGuinness (born 2 June 1968) is a British academic, critic, novelist, and poet. He is a professor of French and comparative literature at the University of Oxford, where he is a fellow and tutor at St Anne's College.

He is a Chevalier in the Order of the Arts et Lettres, awarded by the French government, as well as an Officier in the Order of the Palmes académiques, and is a Fellow of the Royal Society of Literature, and was elected a Fellow of the Learned Society of Wales in 2011.

== Life ==
McGuinness was born in Tunisia in 1968 to a Belgian mother and an English father of Irish descent from Newcastle-upon-Tyne. He grew up in Belgium and also lived for periods in Venezuela, Iran, Romania and the UK. He attended Clifton College in Bristol, before studying for a bachelor's degree in English Language and Literature at Downing College, Cambridge, and a master's degree in American Studies (Ezra Pound and French Symbolism) at the University of York before going on to a DPhil in French theatre at Magdalen College, Oxford.

== Work ==
McGuinness's production is divided between literary criticism and fiction, memoir and poetry. In December 2025, while reviewing his book Ghost Stations in the Times Literary Supplement, Harry Eyres called him 'the closest British literature may have to WG Sebald, which is no mean feat'. Jonathan Keates in the Literary Review called McGuinness's writing 'a lantern for us to negotiate the shadows'.

=== Literary criticism and scholarship ===
McGuinness is a Professor of French and Comparative Literature at the University of Oxford, and Fellow in French at St Anne's College, Oxford, and was formerly Fellow in French at Jesus College, Oxford and a Junior Fellow at The Queen's College. Before that, he was a lecturer in English at Magdalen College, Oxford, and taught briefly in the English department at the University of Warwick. Among his academic publications there is a study of T. E. Hulme, an English literary critic and poet who was influenced by Bergson and who, in turn, had a strong influence on English modernism. He is the author of a book on the Belgian playwright Maurice Maeterlinck and modern theatre, and a book on poetry and radical politics in late 19th C France. He has also translated Stéphane Mallarmé, a major symbolist poet, and edited an anthology in French of symbolist and decadent poetry.

McGuinness edited two volumes of the Argentinian-Welsh poet and novelist Lynette Roberts, who was highly appreciated by T. S. Eliot and Robert Graves. According to McGuinness, Roberts "might fairly be claimed to be our greatest female war poet" whose work "constitutes one of the most imaginative poetic responses to modern war and the home front in the English language."

=== Poetry, fiction, and memoir ===
McGuinness published his first poetry collection, The Canals of Mars, in 2004. His poems have appeared in numerous anthologies and translated anthologies of British and Irish poetry.

His first novel, The Last Hundred Days (2011) was centred on the end of the Ceaușescus' regime in Romania, and was longlisted for the Man Booker Prize, shortlisted for the Costa First Novel Award and the Authors' Club Best First Novel Award; a French version was published under the title Les Cent Derniers Jours. It won the Writers' Guild Award for Fiction and the Wales Book of the Year. He won Wales Book of the Year a second time, in 2015, for his memoir Other People's Countries.

His memoir of childhood in the Belgian town of Bouillon, Other People's Countries: A Journey into Memory, appeared in 2014 and won the Duff Cooper Prize and the Wales Book of the Year, and was shortlisted for the Pen Ackerley Prize and the James Tait Black Memorial Prize.

His second novel, Throw Me to the Wolves (2019), won the Encore Award for best second novel from the Royal Society of Literature. It is a fictionalised account of the murder of Joanna Yeates in Bristol in 2010, and the subsequent persecution and false accusations against schoolteacher Christopher Jefferies, who was McGuinness's English teacher at school in Bristol in the 1980s.

In 2024 his third book of poems, Blood Feather, was shortlisted for the inaugural PEN Heaney Prize. Also in 2024 he and Stephen Romer won the Scott Moncrieff Prize for their translation of The Day's Ration by Gilles Ortlieb.

== Prizes and awards ==
- 1998 Eric Gregory Award
- 2001 Levinson Prize, Poetry (Chicago) and the Poetry Foundation
- 2005 Roland Mathias Prize, shortlist, The Canals of Mars
- 2006 The Poetry Business Competition, 19th Century Blues
- 2009 Chevalier dans l'Ordre des Palmes Académiques
- 2011 Costa Book Awards, shortlist, The Last Hundred Days
- 2011 Man Booker Prize, longlist, for The Last Hundred Days
- 2012 Chevalier des Arts et des Lettres
- 2012 Wales Book of the Year for The Last Hundred Days
- 2012 Prix du Premier Roman Etranger for French translation of The Last Hundred Days
- 2014 Duff Cooper Prize for Other People's Countries
- 2015 Wales Book of the Year for Other People's Countries
- 2016 R. H. Gapper Book Prize for French Studies, for Poetry and Radical Politics in Fin de Siècle France
- 2020 Encore Award for Throw Me to the Wolves
- 2023 Prix Triennal du Rayonnement des Lettres Belges, Prix Léo Beeckman, for contribution to the literature of Belgium
- 2024 Scott Moncrieff Prize for Translation, with Stephen Romer, for The Day's Ration: Selected Poems of Gilles Ortlieb
- 2024 PEN Heaney Prize (shortlisted) for Blood Feather

== Bibliography ==
- T. E. Hulme: Selected Writings (Carcanet Press/Routledge USA, 1998, 2003) ISBN 978-1-85754-722-1
- New Poetries II, an anthology, edited by Michael Schmidt, Carcanet, 1999, pp. 70–76 ISBN 1-85754-349-1
- Maurice Maeterlinck and the Making of Modern Theatre Oxford University Press, 1999 ISBN 0-19-815977-3
- Symbolism, Decadence and the 'Fin de Siècle': French and European Perspectives (editor) University of Exeter Press, 2000 ISBN 978-0-85989-646-7
- Anthologie de la Poésie Symboliste et Décadente (editor) Les Belles Lettres (France), 2001 ISBN 978-2-251-44365-2
- J-K Huysmans' Against Nature (editor) Penguin, 2003 ISBN 978-0-14-044763-7
- S.Mallarmé For Anatole's Tomb (translator) Carcanet, 2003, ISBN 978-1-85754-636-1
- Marcel Schwob, Oeuvres (editor) Les Belles Lettres (France), 2003 ISBN 978-2-251-44220-4
- The Canals of Mars Carcanet, 2004, ISBN 1-85754-772-1
- Lynette Roberts: Collected Poems (editor) Carcanet, 2005, ISBN 1-85754-842-6
- I canali di Marte edited and translated by Giorgia Sensi, Mobydick, 2006, ISBN 978-88-8178-335-9
- 19th Century Blues Smith/Doorstop, 2007, ISBN 978-1-902382-88-3
- Lynette Roberts: Diaries, Letters and Recollections, (editor) Carcanet, 2009, ISBN 978-1-85754-856-3
- Jilted City Carcanet, 2010, ISBN 978-1-85754-968-3
- L'età della sedia vuota, (original title Jilted City) ed. and transl. by Giorgia Sensi, Il Ponte del Sale, Rovigo, 2011, ISBN 88-89615-17-6
- The Last Hundred Days, Seren, 2011, ISBN 978-1-85411-541-6
- Other People's Countries: A Journey into Memory, Jonathan Cape, 2014 ISBN 978-0-224-09830-4
- Poetry and Radical Politics in Fin de Siecle France: From Anarchism to Action Francaise, OUP, 2015
- Throw Me to the Wolves, Jonathan Cape, 2019, ISBN 978-1787331464
- Real Oxford, Seren Books, 2021
- Blood Feather, Jonathan Cape, 2023 (poems)
- Ghost Stations: Essays and Branchlines, CB Editions, 2025 (essays)
