= Delfina Acosta =

Paraguayan poet and writer

Delfina Acosta (born December 24, 1956) is a Paraguayan poet and short story writer.

Acosta is a native of Asunción, and is by profession a pharmacist. Interested in literature from youth, she began her career as a published poet when some of her verse appeared in Poesía itinerante in 1984. Among her works are several collections of poetry and of short stories. She has received various awards for her work, including the PEN/Edward and Lily Tuck Award for Paraguayan Literature for Versos de amor y de locura in 2012.

== Works ==
- Poesía itinerante (1984)
- Todas las voces, mujer (1986)
- La cruz del colibrí (1993)
- Pilares de Asunción (1987)
- Versos esenciales, como homenaje al poeta chileno Pablo Neruda (2001)
- Romancero de mi pueblo (2003)
- El viaje, short stories (1995)
- Querido mío (2004)
- Versos de amor y de locura
