= For Anatole's Tomb =

Unfinished poem by Stéphane Mallarmé

- Author: Stéphane Mallarmé
- Original title: Pour un tombeau d'Anatole
- Translators: Paul Auster; Patrick McGuinness
- Language: French
- Publisher: Éditions du Seuil
- Publication date: 1961
- Publication place: France
- English publication date: 1983

"For Anatole's Tomb" ("Pour un tombeau d'Anatole") is an unfinished poem by the French writer Stéphane Mallarmé. It is also known as A Tomb for Anatole. It was written after the death of Mallarmé's son Anatole in 1879. The finished fragments were published in 1961.

== Writing process ==
In 1879, Mallarmé's eight-year-old son Anatole died after a lengthy illness now diagnosed as pediatric rheumatism.

Mallarmé had previously written a "tomb" ("tombeau") poem after the death of Edgar Allan Poe, and would later write tombeaux for Charles Baudelaire and Paul Verlaine. The aim of the tombeaux genre was not only to mourn, but also in a certain way to eternalize the dead person by means of the poem. He started working on a "tomb" poem for his son, but it was never finished before Mallarmé himself died in 1898. Left were 202 sheets of fragmentary notes.

== Publication ==
The finished material was published as Pour un tombeau d'Anatole in 1961 through Éditions du Seuil, with an introduction by Jean-Pierre Richard.

== English translations ==
An English translation by the American author Paul Auster was published in the Summer 1980 issue of The Paris Review, and in book form in 1983, with the title A Tomb for Anatole.

A new translation by Patrick McGuinness, with the title For Anatole's Tomb, was published in 2003, and was selected as the year's Translation Choice by the Poetry Book Society. Will Stone reviewed the book in The Guardian in 2003, and called it "an honest, unaffected work", which "can be read with equal satisfaction by both an admirer of Mallarmé and someone who has read little or nothing of the poet before". Stone continued: "This collection has a curious intimacy and poignancy. It is hard to believe that these poem shards were written well over 100 years ago, since they seem so contemporary and accessible, despite any initial obscurity. The translation is careful but confident, finding the right balance between faithfulness to the French and sustaining a creative thrust in English."

== See also ==
- 19th-century French literature
