= Javier Viveros =

Paraguayan writer

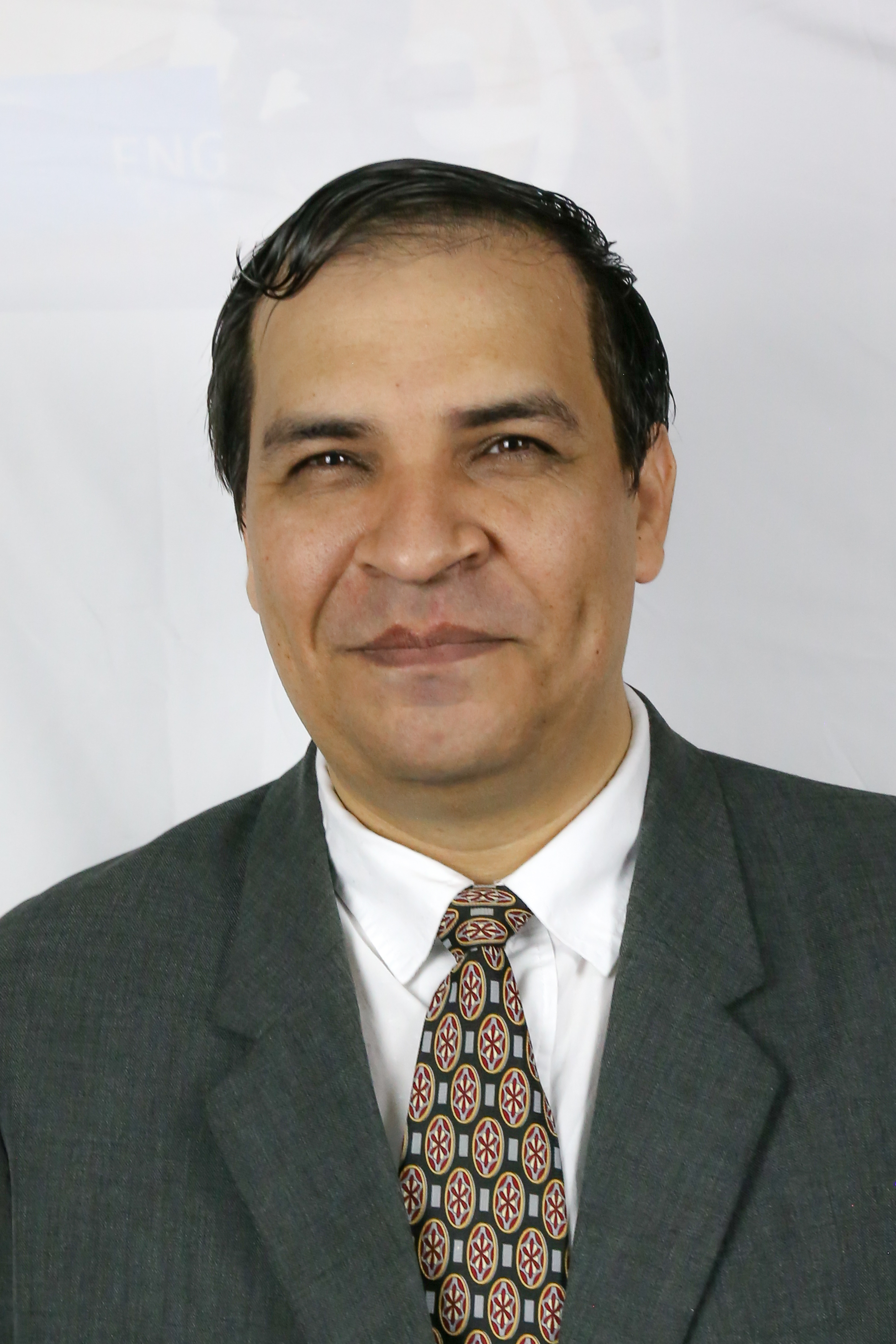
- Born: 13 September 1977 (age 48); Asunción, Paraguay
- Occupations: Narrator, poet, script writer
- Writing career
- Notable works: Fencing Manual for Elephants, Inventory of ghosts, Urban, too urban, Requiem of the Chaco, Iron pages
- Website: www.javierviveros.com

Javier Viveros (born 13 September 1977) is a Paraguayan writer. He is active member of Academia de la Lengua Guaraní, also of Academia Paraguaya de la Lengua Española, corresponding member of Real Academia Española and former Vice-president of the Paraguayan Writers Society. He currently serves as the Minister of the Secretariat of Language Policies of Paraguay.

== Life ==
He received a master's degree in Language and Literature from the National University of Asunción and Comparative Literature (Pontificia Universidad Católica Argentina). He has traveled through several genres, among which it can be mentioned: poetry, short stories, children's literature, scripts for theater, comics and movies.

He regularly collaborates with the "Correo Semanal", a cultural supplement of the newspaper Última Hora. He has also worked as a university professor. His book of ñe'ẽnga (folkloric phrases) and the one of stories titled "Underneath the radar" were distributed to country level with the newspaper ABC Color. Also, the works A bed for Mimi and Alonsí were distributed through the "magic box", a product from the fast food multinational Burger King, thanks to the trades of the Alfaguara publishing house. Gunpowder and dust, the work of war cartoon about the Chaco War with scripts by Javier Viveros, was published in weekly fascicles by the newspaper Última Hora.

In the role of editor he has published Punta karaja, an anthology of Paraguayan football soccer stories. In addition, as publisher he has published the illustrated album, Mrs. Jurumi, under his own publishing label. He has written scripts and directed for the Servilibro publishing house the collection "Paraguayan Literature in Comic Strips", that took to the comics format several stories of great Paraguayan authors, among which Augusto Roa Bastos, Gabriel Casaccia, Helio Vera and Josefina Plá.

Either as a guest speaker or as a member of the official delegation of Paraguay, he has participated in book fairs in Resistencia (Argentina), Buenos Aires (Argentina), Santiago (Chile), Maldonado (Uruguay), La Paz (Bolivia) and Santo Domingo (Dominican Republic).

In 2012, his book of stories Handbook of fencing for elephants was published in Argentina by Ediciones Encendidas and in Spain by Ediciones Rubeo, in addition to the publication in Paraguay, by the publisher Arandurã. The Tokyo publisher Happa-no-kofu published a Japanese translation of the haikus in his book On a tile. It has been included in anthologies of Germany, Argentina, Chile, Cuba, Spain, Scotland, Paraguay and the Dominican Republic. The Chilean publisher "Cuarto propio" published For the love of the football: eleven cracks of fiction soccer, a collection of football soccer stories on a continental level (one story per country). His story "Football Soccer S.A." was selected to integrate this collection, which also includes writers like Juan Villoro (México) and Edmundo Paz Soldán (Bolivia). That work was translated into English and published as Idols and Underdogs, by the Scottish publisher "Freight Books."

The number 85 of the magazine Luvina (published by the University of Guadalajara) selected him among the most outstanding Latin American writers of less than 40 years of age. Regarding the selection criteria, the committee expresses "Luvina offers in this issue a collection of original voices that are accompanied and contrast each other, voices with bold proposals and contemporary literary structures, managing to settle the map of vicissitudes extended in this territory".

He was Vice-president of the Society of Writers of Paraguay from July 2016 to July 2018.

== Bibliography ==
Short stories

- 2008 - Ingenierías del insomnio
- 2009 - Urbano, demasiado urbano
- 2012 - Manual de esgrima para elefantes
- 2015 - Fantasmario - Cuentos de la Guerra del Chaco
- 2021 - Vríngo luisõ
- 2023 - Páginas de hierro
- 2025 - Omombe'uva'ekue Jasy ikerañe'ẽme

Poetry

- 2007 - Dulce y doliente ayer
- 2008 - En una baldosa
- 2009 - Mensajeámena
- 2009 - Panambi ku'i

Theatre

- 2018 - Flores del yuyal

Children's literature

- 2013 - Una cama para Mimi
- 2014 - Alonsí
- 2017 - Tana, la campana
- 2017 - La señora Jurumi
- 2018 - La carrera chaqueña
- 2018 - Pepo y Lalo
- 2018 - ¿De quién es esta pluma?
- 2018 - Mymba saraki
- 2018 - Siete cántaros de lluvia
- 2018 - Alarma en el takuru
- 2019 - Cinco dientes de león
- 2019 - Mosi en el Chaco
- 2019 - Los indomables
- 2019 - Toni en las alturas
- 2019 - Tres dinocuentos
- 2019 - Luna y los fuegos artificiales
- 2019 - Historias de Animalia
- 2020 - Sonata para cigarra y piano
- 2022 - La mudanza de Lito
- 2022 - El tatakua de la abuela
- 2022 - Lito y el poncho para'i
- 2023 - La ardilla pilla
- 2023 - Superclásico jurásico
- 2023 - Flaminio el dragón
- 2024 - Hasta siempre, Cucú
- 2024 - La vaca michi
- 2024 - Para sanar a un ayurasaurio
- 2024 - Hotel de insectos
- 2024 - Kamby, el oso hormiguero albino
- 2024 - Vacaciones en Piribebuy
- 2024 - El arcoíris desteñido
- 2024 - La revolución de los amberesaurios
- 2024 - San Juan en el valle
- 2024 - El arcoíris desteñido
- 2024 - Chito y la hermana mayor de todas las artes
- 2024 - El buen olfato de Killo Zorrillo
- 2024 - Un regalo para Janto
- 2024 - La biblioteca callejera de la señorita Tokãi
- 2025 - Animales / Mymbakuéra
- 2025 - El señor Karanda'y y otras canciones para pintar
- 2025 - Dormir más y otras canciones para pintar
- 2026 - En el laberinto de Filadelfia
- 2026 - ¿Adónde van las medias que se traga el lavarropas?
- 2026 - ¡Rayas en la playa!
- 2026 - El misterio de la Santa Caverna
- 2026 - Cuando sea grande - Jurumi
- 2026 - Cuando sea grande - Tujuju
- 2026 - Cuando sea grande - Tatú bolita
- 2026 - Cuando sea grande - Piraju
- 2026 - Cuando sea grande - Muã
- 2026 - Cuando sea grande - Teju pytã
- 2026 - Angirũbot

Comic

- 2013 - Pólvora y polvo
- 2015 - Epopeya - Guerra del Chaco
- 2016 - Epopeya - Binacional (various authors)
- 2016 - Epopeya - Guerra Guasu (various authors)
- 2017 - Carpincheros, short story by Roa Bastos
- 2017 - Audiencia privada, short story by Roa Bastos
- 2017 - Pirulí, short story by Roa Bastos
- 2017 - El crack, short story by Roa Bastos
- 2017 - El bosque detrás de la lluvia, short story de Roa Bastos
- 2017 - El doctor Lluvioso, short story by Josefina Plá
- 2017 - El finadorã, short story written in guarani by Tadeo Zarratea
- 2017 - Ka'i rembiasakue, short story written in guarani by Feliciano Acosta
- 2019 - Civilización aliada, Paraguay retã rekove #11
- 2020 - Epopeya del 70
- 2020 - Epopeya - Penurias y fatigas (various authors)
- 2021 - Te lo cuento en cómic - Humor
- 2021 - Dago - Hecho en Paraguay (various authors)
- 2023 - Epopeya - Pólvora y polvo
- 2024 - Senda embrujada, novel by María Eugenia Garay

Novel

- 2019 - Réquiem del Chaco
- 2019 - El burbujero maravilloso (with Diana Viveros)

Opera

- 2021 - Cándido López
- 2023 - Atyrá retablo (with Andrés Colmán Gutiérrez)

Biographies

- 2020 - Branislava Sušnik. La científica implacable
- 2020 - Silvio Pettirossi. El acróbata del aire
- 2020 - Serafina Dávalos. Pionera paraguaya del feminismo
- 2020 - Manuel Ortíz Guerrero. El poeta del pueblo
- 2021 - Arsenio Erico. El rey del gol
- 2021 - Gabriel Casaccia. Fundador de la narrativa paraguaya moderna

== Awards and honours ==
- Finalist of the 2009 edition of the International Short Story Award "Juan Rulfo", with his short story "Misterio JFK", selected among the nearly six thousand texts sent to the contest.
- Honorable Mention in the "Roque Gaona" Prize, 2013 edition (Fencing Manual for Elephants).
- Second prize in the 1st edition of the International Screenwriting Competition "Roa Cinero", organized by the Roa Bastos Foundation.
- Panambi Honorific Award given by 26 Festival Internacional de Cine de Paraguay.
- "Edward and Lily Tuck Award for Paraguayan Literature 2018", given by the PEN Club of the United States to the book "Inventory of ghosts - Tales of the Chaco War" (Fantasmario).
- Finalist of "Concurso Regional de Nouvele EMR 2018", organized by Editorial Municipal de Rosario (Argentina), finalist book is the novel "De Sanctis".
- Roque Gaona Award 2018 for the book "Flores del yuyal".
- Honorable Mention in Premio Municipal de Literatura 2020 for "Réquiem del Chaco".
- Premio República "Luque 2022".
- Asunción City Poetry Prize "Teodoro S. Mongelós" 2023.
- Augusto Roa Bastos Medal, 2024.
