= Eliza Lynch =

Irish woman; First Lady of Paraguay

Eliza Alicia Lynch
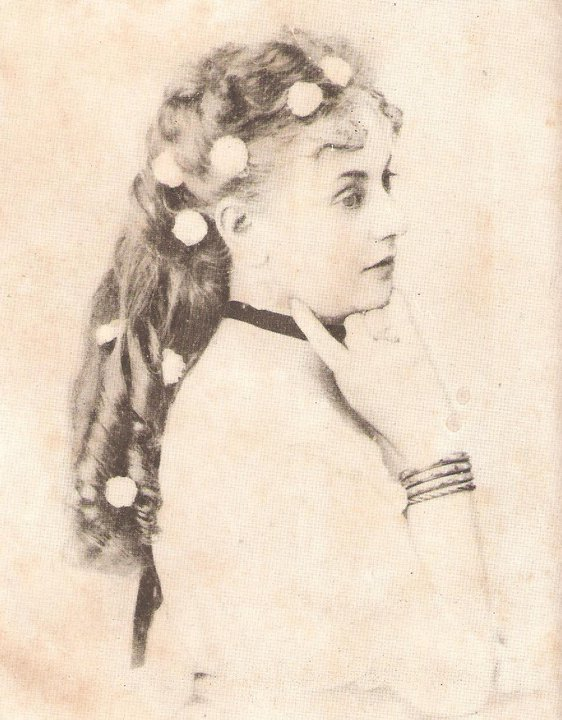
- Eliza, c. 1864

First Lady of Paraguay
- In office 16 October 1862 – 1 March 1870

Personal details
- Born: 19 November 1833 Charleville, County Cork, Ireland
- Died: 27 July 1886 (aged 52) Paris, France
- Spouse(s): Xavier Quatrefages; Francisco Solano López (1854–1870; "de facto")
- Children: Juan Francisco; Corina Adelaida; Enrique Venancio; Federico Morgan Lloyd; Carlos Honorio; Leopoldo
- Occupation: First Lady

Eliza Alice Lynch (Charleville, County Cork, Ireland, 19 November 1833 – Paris, France, 25 July 1886) was the Irish mistress-wife of Francisco Solano López, president of Paraguay.

Slandered as the most vilified woman in Latin American history, she was dubbed as "an ambitious courtesan" who seduced the heir apparent of the Government of Paraguay, Francisco Solano López, turning him into "a bloodthirsty dictator." However, all those accusations were part of the propaganda-warfare by the allies during the Paraguayan War, and are now disproven.

Nowadays, she is considered as a "National Heroine" of Paraguay.

== Early life ==
She was born Eliza Alicia Lynch in Charleville, County Cork, Ireland, at the time part of the United Kingdom of Great Britain and Ireland. She was the daughter of John Lynch, MD and Jane Clarke Lloyd, who was from a family of officers of the Royal Navy. She emigrated at the age of ten with her family to Paris to escape the Great Irish Famine. On 3 June 1850, she married Xavier Quatrefages, a French officer who was shortly afterwards posted to Algeria. She accompanied him, but at eighteen years of age, due to deteriorating health, she returned to Paris to live with her mother in the Strafford household. Courtesy of a few fortuitous introductions, she later entered the elite circle surrounding Princess Mathilde Bonaparte and quickly set herself up as a courtesan.

Eliza Lynch was described as possessing a Junoesque figure, golden blonde hair and a provocative smile. In 1854, Eliza met General Francisco Solano López, son of Carlos Antonio López, the president of Paraguay. The young general, in training with the French army, regarded his country's interests above all as fundamental reasons for his European journey. However, Lynch and López would begin a relationship which led her to return with him during that same year to Paraguay.

== Paraguay ==
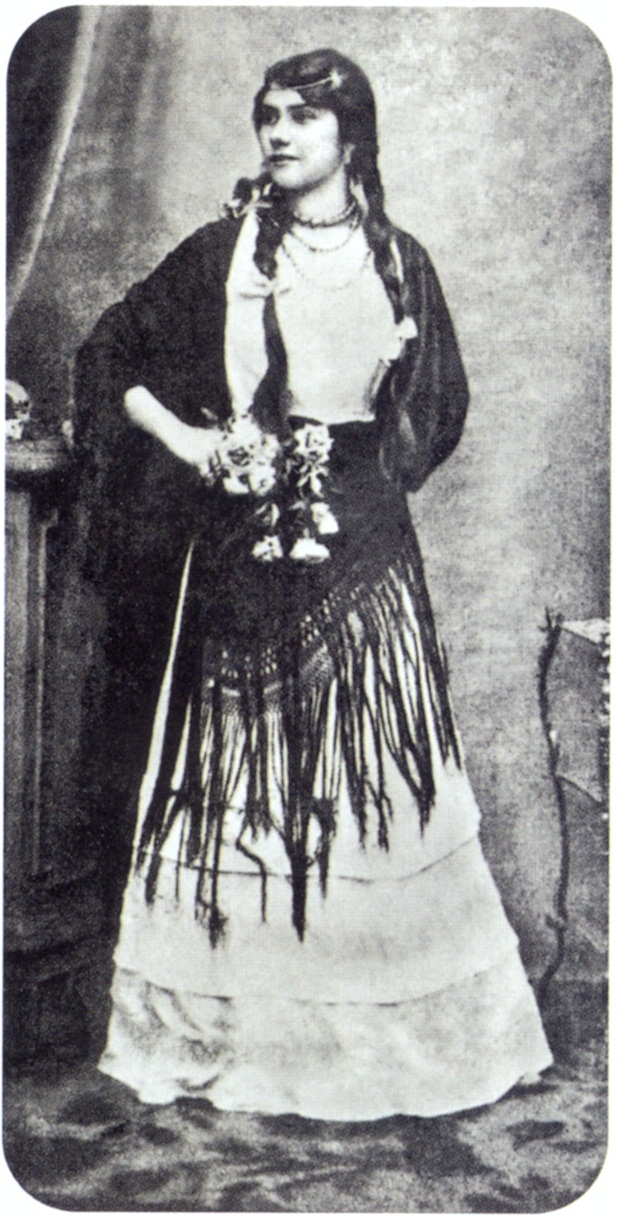
Lynch around age 20, c.1855

Once in Paraguay, Eliza Lynch became López's partner, bearing him six children in total. The eldest of them, Juan Francisco "Panchito" López was born in Asunción in 1855. The last child she would bear to López, Leopoldo, was born in 1867 in the midst of the Paraguayan War, and died soon afterwards of dysentery, as a result of the poor conditions at the front.

After C.A. López died in 1862, he left his son F.S. López as his successor as president. Eliza then became the de facto first lady, as she and López never actually married. Eliza Lynch would spend the next fifteen years as the most powerful woman in the country. While she never married López, her marriage to Quatrefages was annulled on the grounds that it did not fulfil the legal obligations for it to be considered a lawful marriage (he had not received permission to marry from his commanding officer, and they had no children together). This is supported by his remarriage in 1857, a marriage from which he had children.

Arguably, she is considered to be the reason López was so ambitious. However, in a book she wrote in 1876 while in Buenos Aires titled "Exposición. Protesta que hace Elisa A. Lynch" (Exposition. Protest made by Elisa A. Lynch) she states that actually she had no knowledge of, and did not meddle in political affairs, rather dedicating her time during the war to helping the wounded and the innumerable families which followed López wherever he went.

=== Battle of Cerro Corá ===
Lynch followed López during the entire war and led a group of women called "Las Residentas", composed of the soldiers' wives, daughters, and others, who supported the soldiers. It was in this role that she came to be in Cerro Corá on 1 March 1870 when López was finally killed. One of these women was Ramona Martínez, who became known as "the American Joan of Arc" for her fighting and encouragement of the soldiers.

After the Brazilian forces killed López, they headed towards the civilians in order to capture them. López and Lynch's eldest son Juan Francisco, who had been promoted to colonel during the war and was fifteen years old, was with her. The Brazilian officers told him to surrender, and upon replying "Un coronel paraguayo nunca se rinde" (A Paraguayan colonel never surrenders) he was shot and killed by the allied soldiers. At this Lynch, after jumping and covering her son's body, exclaimed "¿Esta es la civilización que han prometido?" ("Is this the civilization you have promised?") in reference to the allies' claim that they intended to free Paraguay from a tyrant and deliver freedom and civilization to the nation. She then buried both López and her son with her bare hands before being taken as prisoner.

== Life after the war, and death ==
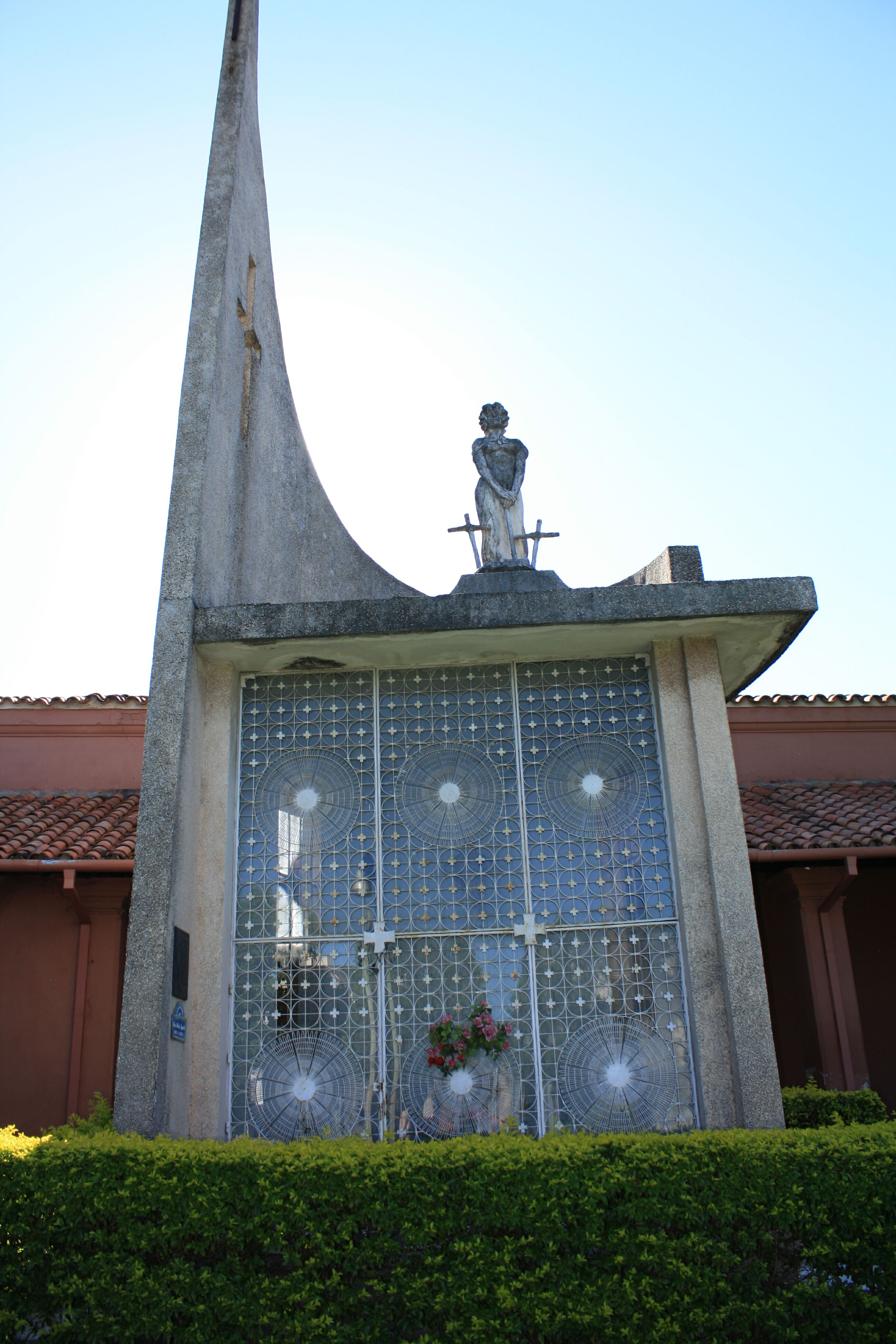
Tomb of Eliza Alicia Lynch at the Recoleta cemetery in Asuncion

After being taken prisoner she was taken on board a ship called the Princesa (Princess) to Asunción, where she was banished from the nation by the newly established provisional government, constituted by Paraguayans who had fought in favour of the allied forces and against López's army. She returned to Europe with her remaining children; and after five years, and under promises of the then-elected Paraguayan president Juan Bautista Gill that she would be respected, she decided to return to Paraguay to settle there and try to claim her former property. Upon arrival, however, she was tried and banished from the country permanently by President Gill. It was during these events that she wrote her book.

Eliza Lynch died in obscurity in Paris on 25 July 1886. Over one hundred years later, her body was exhumed and brought back to Paraguay where the dictator General Alfredo Stroessner proclaimed her a national heroine. Her remains are now located in the national cemetery "Cementerio de la Recoleta".

== Legacy and historical perception ==
Some historians believe that Eliza Lynch was responsible for inducing Francisco Solano López to start the Paraguayan War. During her time as First Lady, Eliza Lynch educated Paraguayan society in many European customs and was largely responsible for the introduction of social events and clubs. She is considered a prominent figure of the war for her support of the troops and her willingness to remain with López until the bitter end. She also introduced the protocol dinners with the ambassadors and ordered the composition of several songs as London Karape. This music has endured until now. She transformed the Paraguayan woman into her way of dressing and thinking. Lynch is known as Madam or Madama Lynch in Paraguay due to her European origins, the fact that she never married López, and the implications of her past as a courtesan.

== Eliza Lynch in art and literature ==
=== Non-fiction ===
- Book published in 1870 about Elisa Lynch.
  Elisa Lynch por Orion, critica literaria, by Mariano Pelliza (1870).
- A history based facts in The Shadows of Elisa Lynch by Siãn Rees. "There is no doubting her scholarship and fine writing"—Sunday Times. ISBN 0-7553-1115-9
- A sympathetic biography which discovers her birthplace is "The Lives of Eliza Lynch" by Michael Lillis and Ronan Fanning (2009) Gill & Macmillan, Dublin. ISBN 978-0717146116
- A more fictional leaning anti-Lynch work, The Empress of South America by Nigel Cawthorne. ISBN 0-09-942809-1
- "Calumnia" La historia de Elisa Lynch y la guerra de la triple alianza by Michael Lillis y Ronan Fanning. Paraguay 2009 (Spanish translation) ISBN 978-99953-907-0-9

=== Fiction ===
Eliza Lynch is often noted as the Paraguayan predecessor to the Argentine Evita (without the change of heart from aristocratic elitism to champion of the downtrodden). Due to the melodramatic appeal of her story, many fictionalized accounts of her life were written at the time and up to the present day, but the historical record is somewhat ignored and liberties are taken to maximize dramatic effect. Novels include:

- William Edmund Barrett, Woman on Horseback (1938)
- Graham Shelby, Demand the World (1990)
- Anne Enright, The Pleasure of Eliza Lynch (2003)
- Lily Tuck, The News from Paraguay (2004), which won the National Book Award for that year

See also The Shadows of Eliza Lynch by Sian Rees (Headline Review (6 January 2003)) and The Empress of South America by Nigel Cawthorne (William Heinemann, London 2003).

Madame Lynch y Solano López by Maria Concepción Leyes de Chávez. Editorial "El Lector" 1996 Paraguay. (Spanish)

Elisa Lynch by Hector Varela. Editorial "El Elefante Blanco". Argentina 1997. (Spanish) ISBN 987-96054-8-9

Pancha Garmendia y Elisa Lynch Opera en cinco actos by Augusto Roa Bastos. Paraguay 2006. Editorial "Servilibro" (Spanish) ISBN 99925-975-7-7

La Gran Infortunada by Josefina Plá. Ediciones "Criterio" Paraguay 2007. (Spanish) OCLC 176892124

Madame Lynch and Friend by Alyn Brodsky. Harper and Row Publishers New York 1975. (English) ISBN 0-06-010487-2

The play Visions (1978) by Louis Nowra depicts Lynch and López leading Paraguay to disaster in the Paraguayan War.

Ballet in two acts "Elisa" (2010) libretto by Jaime Pintos and Carla Castro, music by Nancy Luzko and Daniel Luzko. Commissioned by Ballet Municipal de Asunción

=== Film ===
In the 2013 biographical film Eliza Lynch: Queen of Paraguay, Eliza Lynch was portrayed by Maria Doyle Kennedy.

== See also ==
- Francisco Solano López
- Paraguayan War

== Sources ==
1. Margaret Nicholas, The World's Wickedest Women, Octopus Books, 1984; pp. 34–35
2. Ed Strosser and Michael Prince, Stupid Wars, pp. unknown
