= Najwan Darwish =

Palestinian poet (born 1978)

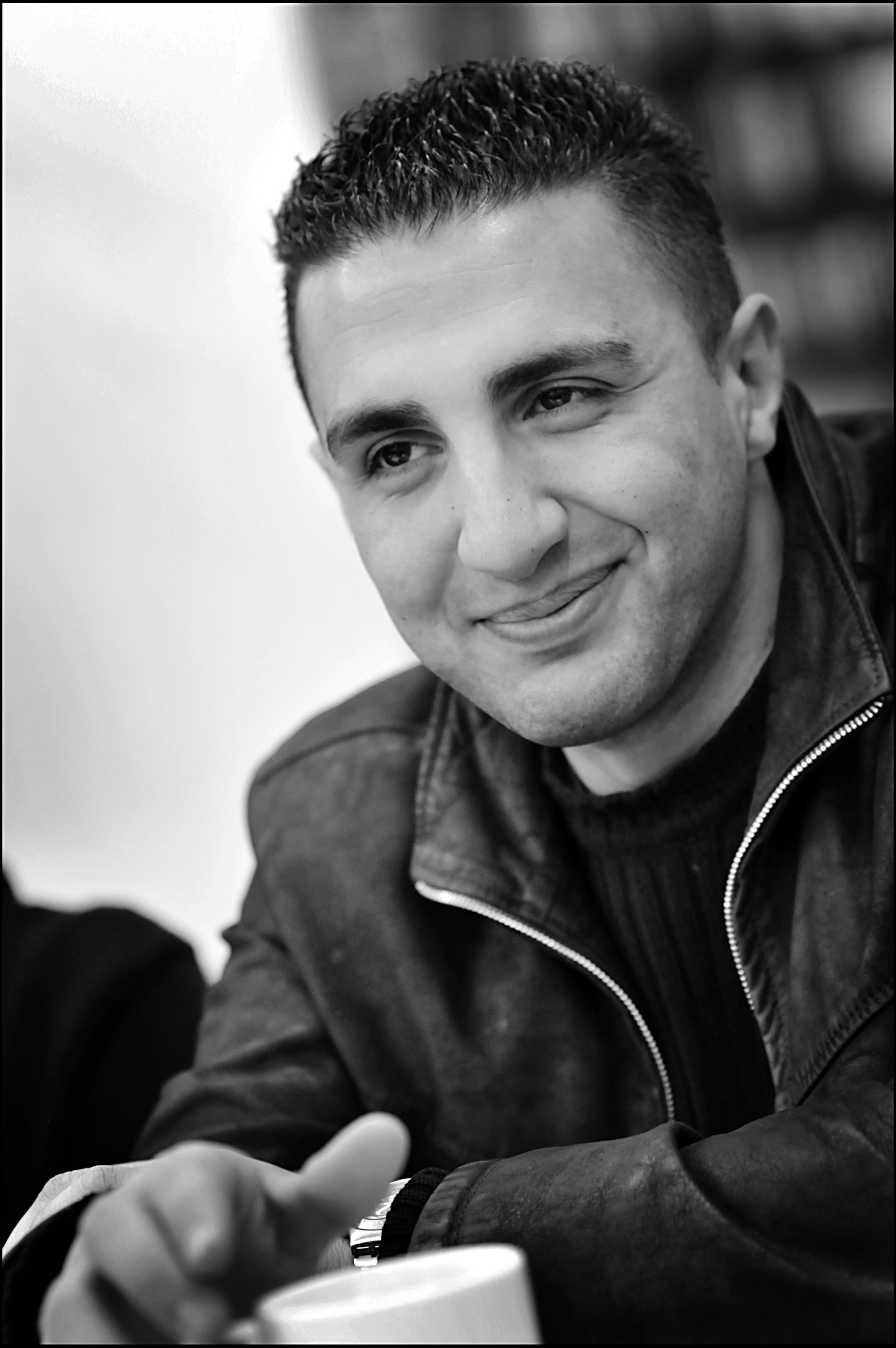
- Darwish in 2008
- Born: December 8, 1978 (age 47); Jerusalem
- Occupations: Poet; Editor
- Writing career
- Notable works: Nothing More to Lose; Exhausted on the Cross
- Notable awards: Sarah Maguire Award for Poetry (2022); Nominated as a finalist for IV Premi Mediterrani Albert Camus (2024)
- Website: www.najwandarwish.com

Najwan Darwish (Arabic: نجوان درويش; born December 8, 1978 in Jerusalem) is a Palestinian poet. In 2009, Darwish was named as one of the Beirut39, a selection of 39 promising Arab writers. In 2014, NPR included his book Nothing More to Lose as one of the best books of the year. Darwish's work has been translated into over 20 languages.

== Career ==
Besides being a poet, Darwish is a cultural editor in the Arab world. He has played an important role in developing Arabic cultural journalism by co-founding independent magazines and mainstream daily newspapers, as well as being a sharp critic. He was the chief editor of Min Wa Ila (from/to) Magazine in Palestine, and the cultural critic for Al Akhbar newspaper in Lebanon from 2006 to 2012, amongst other key positions in cultural journalism. In 2014 he became the founding chief editor of the cultural section of Al Araby Al Jadeed (The New Arab), a major pan-Arab daily newspaper based in London.

Darwish is active in diverse media, culture and art projects in Palestine and the Arab world. He was the literary advisor of MASARAT Palestine, the Palestinian Cultural and Artistic Year in Belgium (2007–2008) alongside the late Palestinian poet Mahmoud Darwish who was the head of the committee. He was the literary advisor to the Palestine Festival of Literature (PalFest).

In 2025 Darwish's poetry collection No One Will Know You Tomorrow (translated by Kareem James Abu-Zeid) was shortlisted for the PEN Heaney Prize.

== Works and translations ==
=== Books in Arabic ===
Title	Year	Publisher	ISBN
The Closer I Got to the Storm (Arabic original: كُلّما اقتربتُ من عاصِفة)	2018	Al-Feel Publications (دار الفيل) & Arab Institute for Research and Publishing (المؤسسة العربية للدراسات والنشر)	9786144198902
Exhausted on the Cross (Arabic original: تَعِبَ المُعلَّقون)	2018	Al-Feel Publications (دار الفيل) & Arab Institute for Research and Publishing (المؤسسة العربية للدراسات والنشر)	9786144199053
Once We Woke Up in Heaven (Arabic original: استيقَظنا مَرَّةً في الجَنَّة)	2020	Al-Feel Publications (دار الفيل) & Arab Institute for Research and Publishing (المؤسسة العربية للدراسات والنشر)	9786144861530
A Chair on the Wall of Akka (Arabic original: كُرسيّ على سُور عَكّا)	2021	Al-Feel Publications (دار الفيل) & Arab Institute for Research and Publishing (المؤسسة العربية للدراسات والنشر)	9786144861547

=== Books in English ===
Title	Year	Publisher	ISBN
No One Will Know You Tomorrow: Selected Poems 2014-2024	2024	Yale University Press	9780300275469
Nothing More to Lose	2014	New York Review Books	9781590177303
Embrace	2020	The Poetry Translation Centre	9781916114128
Exhausted on the Cross	2021	New York Review Books	9781681375526

=== Anthologies ===
- In Ramallah, Running By Guy Mannes-Abbott, Black Dog Publishing, London, 2012. ISBN 978-1907317675.
- Printemps Arabes, Le Souffle et les Mots By Gilles Kraemer & Alain Jauson, Riveneuve Editions, France, 2012. ISBN 978-2360130849.
- Voix Vives de Méditerranée en Méditerranée, Anthologie Sète 2011 Éditions Bruno Doucey, Paris, 2011. ISBN 978-2-36229-019-0.
- Revolutionary Poets Brigade Edited by Jack Hirschman, Caza de Poesia, California, 2010
- Beirut39 Bloomsbury Publishing, London, 2010
- Wherever I Lie Is Your Bed (Two Lines World Writing in Translation) Edited by Margaret Jull Costa and Marilyn Hacker, Center for the Art of Translation, San Francisco, 2009. ISBN 978-1931883160.
- Language for A New Century, Contemporary Poetry from the Middle East, Asia, and Beyond By Tina Chang. W. W. Norton & Company, New York, 2008. ISBN 978-0393332384.
- Le Poème Palestinien Contemporain, Le Taillis Pré, Belgium, 2008
- Palabras Por la Lectura Edited by Javier Pérez Iglesias, Castilla-La Mancha, Spain, 2007
- Pères by Taysir Batniji, with texts by Catherine David and Najwan Darwish, Loris Talmart, Paris, 2007. ISBN 978-2903911843.
- En Tous Lieux Nulle Part Ici: Une Anthologie Edited by Henri Deluy, Le Blue Ciel, Coutras, 2006. ISBN 978-2915232325.

== Interviews ==
Darwish has only rarely given interviews. When he was asked by the Polish magazine Katowice about this he responded with, “I say what I want to say in my poems. My true self is in them.”
