= Catherine Dunne (writer) =

Irish writer

- Born: 1954 (age 71–72); Dublin, Ireland
- Education: Trinity College, Dublin
- Occupation: Novelist
- Website: catherinedunneauthor.com

Catherine Dunne (born 1954) is an Irish writer. She was born in Dublin and studied English and Spanish at Trinity College, Dublin, before becoming a teacher. In 2013, she was awarded the Giovanni Boccaccio International Prize for Fiction for The Things We Know Now, which was published in Italy as Quel che ora sappiamo. Dunne received the Irish PEN Award for Literature in 2018.

== Published books ==
As of March 2025, Dunne had written 12 novels and a work of non-fiction. Her first novel, published in 1997, was In the Beginning, which was described in Publishers Weekly as "an auspicious debut".

=== Non-fiction ===
- An Unconsidered People: The Irish in Sixties London (New Island, 2003)

=== Novels ===
- In the Beginning (Jonathan Cape, 1997)
- A Name for Himself (Jonathan Cape, 1998)
- The Walled Garden (Pan, 2000)
- Another Kind of Life (Picador, 2003)
- Something Like Love (Macmillan, 2006)
- At a Time Like This (Pan, 2007)
- Set in Stone (Pan, 2009)
- Missing Julia (Pan, 2010)
- The Things We Know Now (Pan, 2013)
- Heart of Gold (2015)
- The Years That Followed (Macmillan, 2016)
- A Good Enough Mother (2024)
