= Tarek Eltayeb =

Egyptian-Sudanese writer

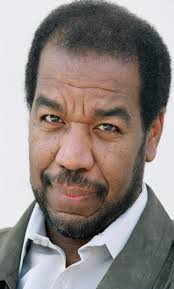
Tarek Eltayeb

Tarek Eltayeb (born 2 January 1959) is an Egyptian-Sudanese writer. He was born to Sudanese parents in Cairo, and has been a resident of the Austrian capital Vienna since 1984. He studied Social and Economic Sciences at the Vienna University of Economics and Business Administration, and is currently professor at the International Management Center/University of Applied Sciences in Krems, Austria.

As a writer, he has published novels, short story collections, volumes of poetry, and drama. He has been anthologized widely and his books have been translated into numerous European languages. His poems have appeared in different languages in various literary anthologies, magazines, and journals worldwide.
