= Susannah Dickey =

Northern Irish novelist and poet

- Born: 1992 (age 33–34); Belfast, Northern Ireland
- Education: Goldsmiths, University of London
- Occupations: Novelist, poet
- Writing career
- Notable awards: Eric Gregory Award (2020); PEN Heaney Prize (2024); Michael Murphy Memorial Poetry Prize (2025)

Susannah Dickey (born 1992) is a novelist and poet from Derry, Northern Ireland. Her debut poetry collection, ISDAL (2023), won the inaugural PEN Heaney Prize in 2024.

== Early life and education ==
Dickey was born in Belfast and grew up in Derry. She earned an MA in Creative and Life Writing at Goldsmiths, University of London, and subsequently studied creative writing at the Seamus Heaney Centre at Queen's University Belfast.

== Career ==
=== Fiction ===
Dickey's first novel, Tennis Lessons, was published by Doubleday in 2020. A bildungsroman narrated in the second person, it follows a young woman's adolescence and early adulthood. Her second novel, Common Decency (2022), alternates between Lily and Siobhán, two women living in the same apartment building in Belfast. It explores grief, isolation and Lily's growing obsession with her neighbour.

In 2021, her short story "Stuffed Peppers" was longlisted for the Sunday Times Audible Short Story Award.

Her third novel, Into the Wreck, was published in 2026. It follows five members of a family as they respond to a man's death and prepare for his funeral, moving between their different perspectives on their relationships and bereavement.

=== Poetry ===
Before publishing her first full-length collection, Dickey published four poetry pamphlets between 2017 and 2022. She won the Vincent Buckley Poetry Prize in 2019. Her pamphlet Bloodthirsty for Marriage received an Eric Gregory Award in 2020.

Her first full-length collection, ISDAL, was published by Picador in 2023. Taking the case of the Isdal Woman as its starting point, it examines the ethics of true crime and representations of violence against women. It combines a parody of a true-crime podcast, a lyric essay and a sequence of poems about the girl who discovered the woman's body.

ISDAL was shortlisted for the Felix Dennis Prize for Best First Collection in 2023 and the John Pollard Foundation International Poetry Prize in 2024. It won the inaugural PEN Heaney Prize in 2024 and the Michael Murphy Memorial Poetry Prize in 2025.

== Bibliography ==
=== Novels ===
- Tennis Lessons (Doubleday, 2020)
- Common Decency (Doubleday, 2022)
- Into the Wreck (Bloomsbury, 2026)

=== Poetry pamphlets ===
- I Had Some Very Slight Concerns (2017)
- Genuine Human Values (2018)
- Bloodthirsty for Marriage (2020)
- Oh! (2022)

=== Poetry collections ===
- ISDAL (Picador, 2023)
