= PEN Heaney Prize =

The PEN Heaney Prize is an annual poetry award launched in 2024. It is delivered as a partnership between English PEN, Irish PEN/PEN na hÉireann and the estate of the Irish poet Seamus Heaney, after whom it is named. A volume of poetry qualifies for the award if it is written by a single author, is published in the United Kingdom or Ireland, is judged to be "of outstanding literary merit", and "engages with the impact of cultural or political events on human conditions or relationships."

The winner of the PEN Heaney Prize is awarded £5,000. If the winning volume has been translated into English from another language, £5,000 is also awarded to the translator or translators.

== Winners and shortlists ==
Year	Author(s)	Title	Publisher	Result	Reference
2024	Susannah Dickey	ISDAL	Picador Poetry	Winner	
2024	Martina Evans	The Coming Thing	Carcanet Poetry	Shortlisted	
2024	Fran Lock	Hyena!	Poetry Bus Press	Shortlisted	
2024	Patrick McGuinness	Blood Feather	Cape Poetry	Shortlisted	
2024	Dawn Watson	We Play Here	Granta Poetry	Shortlisted	
2024	Yang Lian	A Tower Built Downwards (translated by Brian Holton)	Bloodaxe Books	Shortlisted	
2025
2025	Tom Paulin	Namanlagh	Faber & Faber	Winner	
2025	Don Mee Choi	Mirror Nation	And Other Stories	Shortlisted	
2025	Najwan Darwish	No One Will Know You Tomorrow (translated by Kareem James Abu-Zeid)	Yale University Press	Shortlisted	
2025	Lena Khalaf Tuffaha	Something About Living	the87press	Shortlisted	
2025	Stav Poleg	The Banquet	Carcanet Poetry	Shortlisted	
2025	Karen Solie	Wellwater	Pan Macmillan (Picador)	Shortlisted	

== Judges ==
- 2024: Nick Laird, Paula Meehan and Shazea Quraishi
- 2025: Sasha Dugdale, Seán Hewitt and Zaffar Kunial
