= The Mehlis Report (book) =

2005 book by Lebanese author Rabee Jaber

- First edition (Arabic)
- Author: Rabee Jaber
- Translator: Kareem James Abu-Zeid
- Cover artist: Paul Sahre
- Language: Arabic
- Genre: Historical fiction
- Publisher: New Directions Publishing
- Publication date: 2005 (2013 in English)
- Publication place: Lebanon
- Pages: 202
- ISBN: 978-0-8112-2064-4
- Dewey Decimal: 892.7'37-dc23
- LC Class: PJ7840.A289T3513 2013

The Mehlis Report is a book by Lebanese author Rabee Jaber. Published in 2005 in Arabic by Jaber, it tells the story of an architect, Saman Yarid, who is waiting for the United Nations' Mehlis Report to be released in late 2005. The Mehlis Report takes the reader on a journey through Lebanese history regarding the lead up to the release of German prosecutor Detlev Mehlis' report to the United Nations on October 21, 2005, regarding the February 14, 2005, car bombing assassination of Lebanon's former Prime Minister Rafik Hariri.

== Synopsis ==
=== Plot ===
The protagonist of Rabee Jaber's novel is Saman Yarid, a 40-year-old architect living in East Beirut in late 2005, who, like many of his fellow Lebanese citizens, is greatly anticipating the release of the Mehlis Report on October 21, 2005. The narrator of the book is Josephine Yarid, Saman's sister who was kidnapped in 1983 and is now watching over Saman from the afterlife as he walks around Beirut. For a few chapters, Josephine takes the reader away from Saman and focuses on what the afterworld is like. Although the Mehlis Report is all that anyone talks about, Saman never learns who Detlev Mehlis blames for the assassination of Hariri because Saman has a heart attack on October 20, 2005. Throughout the book, Saman reminisces about Beirut before warfare and explosions devastated the city, when his family and friends still lived there. Throughout the book, Saman and his girlfriend, Cecilia, discuss how different aspects of society have transformed.

The book is structured so that the reader constantly wonders what is going on, while slowly revealing information. The reader finds out who the narrator is on page 131, when she says her name is Josephine, Saman's sister. The reader also does not know who Mehlis is until page 24 in the book, when Saman tells Mary that "there's an international commission investigating things […with…] German prosecutor Detlev Mehlis […] presenting his report to the UN in just a few days." The reader learns later in the book that Mehlis is conducting the UN's second investigation into the Hariri assassination because the first was led by Irish UN delegate Peter FitzGerald, Irish commissioner and author of the FitzGerald Report on assassination of Rafic Hariri.

=== Characters ===
- Saman Yarid is the main subject of the novel. He is in charge of the Yarid Architecture and Design Agency, which is located in the middle of Beirut. He lives in Achrafieh, a neighborhood in Beirut. He has three sisters. All of his family left Lebanon years ago to avoid the violence. As he walks around Beirut at night, Saman experiences multiple events, such as witnessing two people playing around with a car at night.
- Cecilia is Saman's girlfriend. She works at a store called Monoprix.
- Josephine Yarid is one of Saman's three sisters. In 1983, she was kidnapped. Josephine is the narrator of the book, speaking from beyond the grave. She watches the daily routines of Saman on the televisions in the afterlife.
- Mary Yarid is one of Saman's three sisters. She lives in Baltimore and is married to her cousin. She and her husband live with four children and own a Lebanese restaurant and a bakery. She keeps calling Saman, asking for him to visit.
- Emily Yarid is one of Saman's three sisters. She lives in Paris and works for UNESCO as a translator. She keeps writing Saman letters begging him to leave East Beirut.

== Publication ==
=== Development ===
Rabee Jaber is a Lebanese novelist whose 18 books have made him distinguished in the Arabic speaking world. He was born in Beirut in 1972 and has been the editor of the Al-Hayat newspaper's weekly cultural supplement since 2001. Three of his books have been nominated for and another has been awarded the International Prize for Arabic Fiction, which was created in 2008 – three years after The Mehlis Report was first published in Arabic. Jaber's writings, similar to the writings of many modern Lebanese authors, draw a lot of influence from Lebanon's civil war and the recent history of violence that has stuck with the Lebanese people.

=== Translation ===
Egyptian-American translator Kareem James Abu-Zeid translated The Mehlis Report from Arabic into English. An award-winning translator, Abu-Zeid also translated Jaber's Confessions, Najwan Darwish's Nothing More to Lose, and Dunya Mikhail's The Iraqi Nights from Arabic into English.

== Historical Context ==
=== The United Nations' Mehlis Report ===
Detlev Mehlis was the head German prosecutor in the United Nations' investigation of the February 2005 assassination of Lebanon's former Prime Minister Rafik al-Hariri. The Mehlis Report was released on October 21, 2005, and found that high-ranking members of the Syrian & Lebanese governments were involved in the assassination.

=== Lebanese Civil War ===
The Lebanese Civil War, from 1975 to 1990, involved multiple groups fighting against one another and multiple foreign powers, such as Israel and Syria, invading Lebanon. An estimated 120,000 people died as a result of the Civil War. Following the Civil War, all militias were ordered to disband, but a few refused to do so and fought with the Lebanese Army over the next few years. Israel withdrew its forces from Lebanon in 2000. While the book takes place in 2005, the history of Lebanon's Civil War still has a big impact on the way Lebanese society functions and on the way the main character, Saman Yarid, sees his city.

== Themes ==
Some themes in the book are death, family, and the afterlife. The narrator for the majority of the book, Josephine, is dead and discusses how her death and the deaths of other people have helped defined the Lebanon Saman knows so well. The family of Saman is an important aspect of the book because he is always thinking about them and they keep begging him to leave Lebanon and join them. Similar to death, talk of the afterlife is featured extensively when Josephine describes her situation and what it is like to be dead.

== Critical reception ==
Originally, few critics outside of Lebanon reviewed The Mehlis Report. However spreading abroad it picked up positive reviews. The New York Review of Books' Robyn Creswell, generally liked the book, saying that the book "is held together less by its plot or characters than by its uncanny way of capturing the zeitgeist."

The Nation reviewed the book positively, stating it "creates a foil in death to a governing culture", excellently considering the issues of Lebanon, its intelligence services and Lebanon society's inability to come to terms with its actions.

NPR also rated the book positively, praising its ability to draw in readers into a different world while inspiring mourning for "this elegy for a lost Beirut".
