= The News from Paraguay =

2004 novel by Lily Tuck

The News from Paraguay: A Novel
- Author: Lily Tuck
- Language: English
- Publication date: 2004
- Publication place: United States

The News from Paraguay: A Novel is 2004 novel by Lily Tuck and was the National Book Award winner for fiction. It is a historical novel set in 19th century Paraguay, and explores the life of an Irish courtesan, Eliza Lynch, as she courts the soon to be Paraguayan president Francisco Solano López. The novel is a series of vignettes and correspondence from their courtship.

== Critical reception ==
The novel had mixed reception, despite its reception of the National Book Award. Historical Novel Society review Lisa Ann Verge described the novel as well researched, "the novel is bursting with detail – but the collection of facts leaves this reader craving the illumination that good fiction should supply." Washington Post Reviewer Joanne Omang, did not think Tuck's sprawling scope fit well within a novel, writing "the sheer sprawl of Tuck's subject matter seems to have overwhelmed her; she has put it all into her story without focus, rather than pruning away the undergrowth to showcase the two lovers or to illumine the history they created."

On the other hand, Kirkus called this scope a " skillfully distribute[d] dozens of narrative vignettes among these two impetuously matched lovers." While the Kirkus review called the novel "A splendid realization of its rich subject, and Tuck’s best so far."
