= Rabee Jaber =

Lebanese novelist and journalist (born 1972)

- Born: 1972 (age 53–54); Beirut, Lebanon
- Occupation: Novelist
- Writing career
- Notable work: The Druze of Belgrade
- Notable awards: International Prize for Arabic Fiction

Rabee Jaber (Arabic: ربيع جابر; born 1972, Beirut) is a Lebanese novelist and journalist.

== Life ==
Jaber studied Physics at the American University of Beirut (AUB). He is also editor of Afaaq (in Arabic آفاق meaning Horizons in Arabic), the weekly cultural supplement of Al-Hayat, a daily pan-Arab international newspaper.

His books have been translated into French, German, Spanish and Polish, most notably: Rahlat al Gharnati (The Journey of the Granadan) as Die Reise des Granadiners by publisher Hans Shiler, 2005), Byretus, Underground City published by Gallimard in 2008, and Duruz Bilghrad. Hikayat Hanna Yaqub (The Druze of Belgrade) as Druzowie z Belgradu. Historia Hanny Jakuba by Biuro Literackie in 2013, and in Spanish as Los drusos de Belgrado by Turner Libros in 2013.

Some of his work is included in the anthology Beirut39, published on the occasion of Beirut as World Book Capital in 2009. In 2010, Jaber was on the shortlist for the International Prize for Arabic Fiction (IPAF) prize also known as the Arabic Booker Prize for his book America, also adapted for the film Amreeka.

On 27 March 2012, Jaber was announced the winner of the International Prize for Arabic Fiction (IPAF) prize also known as the Arabic Booker Prize for his book The Druze of Belgrade.

== Bibliography ==
(Arabic name, translation in parentheses)

- 1992: Sayyid al-Atmah (سيّد العتمة, Master of Darkness)
- 1995: Shay Aswad (شاي أسود, Black Tea)
- 1996: Al-Bayt al-Akhir (البيت الأخير, The Last House)
- 1996: Al-Farasha al-Zarqa (الفراشة الزرقاء, The Blue Moth)
- 1997: Ralf Rizqallah fi al-Mir'at (رالف رزق الله في المرآة, Ralph Rizqallah in the Looking-Glass)
- 1997: Kuntu Amiran (كُنْتُ أميراً, I was a Prince)
- 1998: Nazra Akhira ala Kin Say (نظرة أخيرة على كين ساي, A Last Look at Kin Say)
- 1999: Yusuf al-Inglizi (يوسف الإنجليزي, Yusuf the Englishman)
- 2002: Rahlat al-Gharnati (رحلة الغرناطي, The Journey of the Granadian)
  - 2005: Translated to German under the title Die Reise des Granadiners (as Rabi Jabir)
- 2003: Bayrut Madinat al-'Alam: Al-Juz' al-Awwal (بيروت مدينة العالم: الجزء الأول, Beirut City of the World: Part One)
- 2005: Byretus Madinat Taht al-Ard (بيريتوس: مدينة تحت الأرض, Byretus Underground City)
- 2005: Bayrut Madinat al-'Alam: Al-Juz' al-Thani (بيروت مدينة العالم: الجزء الثاني, Beirut City of the World: Part Two)
- 2006: Takrir Mehlis (تقرير مهليس, The Mehlis Report)
- 2007: Bayrut Madinat al-'Alam: Al-Juz' al-Thalith (بيروت مدينة العالم: الجزء الثالث, Beirut City of The World: Part Three)
- 2008: Al-I'tirafat (الاعترافات, Confessions)
- 2009: America (أميركا, America)
- 2010: The Druze of Belgrade (دروز بلغراد)
- 2011: Birds of the Holiday Inn (طيور الهوليداي إن)
