= Lily Tuck =

American novelist and short story writer (born 1938)

- Born: October 10, 1938 (age 87); Paris, France
- Education: Radcliffe College (BA)
- Writing career
- Genres: short story, novel
- Notable awards: National Book Award for Fiction

Lily Tuck (born October 10, 1938) is an American novelist and short story writer whose novel The News from Paraguay won the 2004 National Book Award for Fiction. Her 2008 biography Woman of Rome: A Life of Elsa Morante won the Premio Elsa Morante. Her novel Siam was nominated for the 2000 PEN/Faulkner Award for Fiction. She is a Guggenheim Fellow.

She has published five other novels, two collections of short stories, as well as her biography of Italian novelist Elsa Morante.

== Life ==
An American citizen born in Paris, Tuck now divides her time between New York City and Islesboro, Maine; she has also lived in Thailand and (during her childhood) Uruguay and Peru. Tuck has stated that "living in other countries has given me a different perspective as a writer. It has heightened my sense of dislocation and rootlessness. ... I think this feeling is reflected in my characters, most of them women whose lives are changed by either a physical displacement or a loss of some kind".

In her 2011 novel, I Married You for Happiness, Tuck explored an unhappy marriage. She explained at the time of its publication that while the book was not autobiographical it had resonance with her first marriage. She stated "In the '60s, I was married to a strong, charismatic person and he took over my life completely". Her second marriage was happier and upon the loss of her second husband, Edward, her grief was such that she was unable to write fiction and instead wrote the biography Woman of Rome: A Life of Elsa Morante which won the Premio Elsa Morante.

== Works ==
Novels

- The Rest is Memory. New York: Liveright, 2024. ISBN 978-1324095729
- Sisters. New York: Atlantic Monthly Press, 2017. ISBN 978-0802127112
- The Double Life of Liliane. New York: Atlantic Monthly Press, 2015. ISBN 978-0-8021-2402-9
- I Married You For Happiness. New York: Atlantic Monthly Press, 2011. ISBN 978-0-8021-1991-9
- The News from Paraguay. New York: HarperCollins, 2004. ISBN 978-0-06-620944-9
- Siam, or the Woman Who Shot a Man. New York: Overlook Press, 1999. ISBN 978-0-87951-723-6
- The Woman Who Walked on Water. New York: Riverhead Books, 1996. ISBN 978-1-57322-583-0
- Interviewing Matisse or the Woman Who Died Standing Up. New York: Knopf, 1991. ISBN 978-0-394-58935-0

Short Stories

- Heathcliff Redux and Other Stories. New York: Atlantic Monthly Press, Feb. 4, 2020. ISBN 978-0802147592
- The House at Belle Fontaine: Stories. New York: Atlantic Monthly Press, 2013. ISBN 978-0-80212-016-8
- Limbo, and Other Places I Have Lived. New York: Harper Perennial, 2002. ISBN 978-0-06-093485-9

Biography

- Woman of Rome: A Life of Elsa Morante. New York: HarperCollins, 2008. ISBN 978-0-06-147256-5
