= Louis Elliman =

Irish theatre manager (1903–1965)

Louis Elliman (28 February 1903 – 15 November 1965) was an Irish impresario and theatre manager.

Elliman was born in Dublin, one of 12 children of Jewish parents: Maurice Elliman, who had fled Tsarist persecution in Russia, and his wife, Leah. Louis was educated at Synge Street CBS and University College Dublin. Maurice Elliman became involved in cinema by establishing the Theatre De Luxe in Camden Street, Dublin, in 1912. After university, Louis started work at a pharmacy but after a few years gave that up to become a film agent in London. In 1931, he married Ettie Robinson, in Dublin’s Adelaide Road synagogue.

In the meantime, Maurice acquired Dublin's Gaiety Theatre, which was passed on to Louis.

In the early 1930s, Louis Elliman sold a 50% share in the Gaiety to entrepreneur Patrick Wall, a native of County Clare. The pair acquired the Metropole and Savoy cinemas, as well as, over time, more than 30 cinemas across Ireland. Acquired by the Rank Organization in 1946, the cinemas remained under Elliman management. Along with Wall, Elliman acquired the Theatre Royal, Dublin in 1936.

With the outbreak of World War II, Wall and Elliman were forced to keep the two theatres going with native talent only. This led to the emergence of a raft of Irish acts who were to provide the mainstay of the Royal's output for the remainder of its existence. These included such Irish household names as Jimmy O'Dea, Harry O'Donovan, Maureen Potter, Danny Cummins, Noel Purcell, Micheál MacLiammoir, Cecil Sheridan, Jack Cruise, Paddy Crosbie, and Patricia Cahill. In July 1951, Judy Garland appeared for a series of sold out performances at the Royal and was received with tremendous ovations. The legendary singer sang from her dressing room window to hundreds of people who were unable to get tickets and critics dubbed her "America's Colleen" Popular Irish American entertainer Carmel Quinn also made her singing debut in the Theatre Royal during the early 1950s.

After a spell acquiring cinemas around the country, which were taken over by the Rank Organization, Louis went into film production. In 1957 he opened Ardmore Studios. With managing director Emmet Dalton he travelled to the USA to promote the studios and to acquire foreign investment. The studios accordingly landed its first major foreign booking with 1959's Shake Hands with the Devil, starring Oscar winner James Cagney. A year later, progress was consolidated when Robert Mitchum appeared in Tay Garnett's "A Terrible Beauty". In 1961, Ardmore Studios hosted the controversial "The Mark", directed by Guy Green, which was nominated for the Palme d'Or at the Cannes Film Festival and earned its star, Stuart Whitman, an Oscar nomination. Other films produced at this time include Don Chaffey's The Webster Boys and "Johnny Nobody" with Cyril Cusack. Hammer Films also utilised the studios as a base for their production, The Viking Queen. The studios went into receivership in 1963 but re-opened later.

Under pressure from rising overheads and the increasing popularity of the cinema and the introduction of television, the Theatre Royal closed its doors on 30 June 1962.

By this time Louis was dogged by bad health and died on November 15, 1965, aged 62.
