= List of Irish theatres and theatre companies =

This is a list of Irish theatres and theatre companies past and present. It includes organizations of both the Republic of Ireland and Northern Ireland.

Theatre or theatre company	Location	Year established	Notes
Abbey Theatre	Dublin		also known as the National Theatre of Ireland
Ambassador Theatre	Dublin		
Andrews Lane Theatre	Dublin		Demolished 2018, had operated solely as a nightclub (Hangar) for some years prior
Aula Maxima	Maynooth, County Kildare		
Bord Gáis Energy Theatre	Dublin		
Born to Burn productions	Dublin		
Brokentalkers	Dublin		
Camden Palace Hotel Community Arts Centre	Cork City		
Capitol Theatre	Dublin		
Civic Theatre	Tallaght, South Dublin		
Coliseum Theatre	Dublin		
Corcadorca Theatre Company	Cork		
Cork Arts Theatre	Cork		
Curious State	Waterford	2016	Waterford-based theatre and street spectacle company.
Craic Theatre	Coalisland		
Cyclamen Productions	Dublin		
Damer Theatre	St Stephen's Green, Dublin	1955	Established by Gael Linn in 1955, closed in 1981.
Dan Lowrey's Music Hall	Dublin		former name of the Olympia Theatre
Dean Crowe Theatre	Athlone, County Westmeath	1937	
Druid Theatre Company	Galway		
Eblana Theatre	Dublin		
Everyman Palace Theatre	Cork		
Firedoor Theatre	Dublin		
Focus Theatre	Dublin		
Gaiety Theatre	Dublin		
Gallping Cat Theatre Company	Dublin		
Gate Theatre	Dublin		
Glass Mask Theatre	Dublin		
Granary Theatre	Cork		
The Green Heart Company			
An Grianán Theatre	Letterkenny, County Donegal		
The Helix	Dublin		
Impact Theatre	Limerick		Shut Down 2009.
Inspirado Theatre Company	County Dublin		
Iontas Theatre	Castleblayney, County Monaghan		
Leinster Hall	Dublin		
Royal Theatre	Castlebar		
The Lord Amiens Theatre	Dublin	1795	Oldest surviving theatre building in Ireland
Lyric Theatre	Belfast		
Lyric Theatre	Dublin		
Mechanics' Theatre	Dublin		
Mullingar Arts Centre	Mullingar, Co. Westmeath		
New Theatre			
Olympia Theatre	Dublin		
Passionfruit Theatre	Athlone, County Westmeath	2005	
Pavilion Theatre	Dún Laoghaire	2001	
The Performance Corporation			
Pike Theatre	Dublin		
Point Theatre	Dublin		
Project Arts Centre	Dublin		Project Theatre
Queen's Theatre	Dublin		
The Rabbit's Riot Theatre Company	The North West of Ireland	2015	
Riff Raff Theatre Company	Wexford		
RSVP (Red Sandstone Varied Productions)	Cork		
Second Age Theatre Company			
Siamsa Tire Theatre	Tralee, County Kerry	1974	Irish National Folk Theatre, founded by Pat Ahern
Smashing Times International Centre for the Arts and Equality	Dublin	1991	Smashing Times incorporates the Smashing Times Theatre and Film Company and Smashing Times Youth Arts Ensemble, and is dedicated to the promotion, study and practice of the arts and equality.
Smock Alley Theatre	Dublin	2012	built on the foundations of the first Theatre Royal, and incorporating structural material from a later 18th century Theatre Royal.
An Taibhdhearc	Galway	1928	Amharclann Náisiúnta na Gaeilge - National Irish Language Theatre.
Theatre of Joy	Dublin		
Theatre Royal	Dublin	1662	
Theatre Royal	Waterford	1785	Current building mostly dates to 1876. Claims to be Ireland's oldest continually-operating theatre, although it has had several closures.
THEATREclub	Dublin		
Tivoli Variety Theatre	Dublin		
Torch Theatre	Dublin		
W. G. Fay's Irish National Dramatic Company			
Limerick Youth Theatre	Limerick	1997	
Web Theatre	Newtownards		

== See also ==
- Architecture of Ireland
- Irish theatre
- List of Irish dramatists
