= Martin Crosbie =

Irish singer

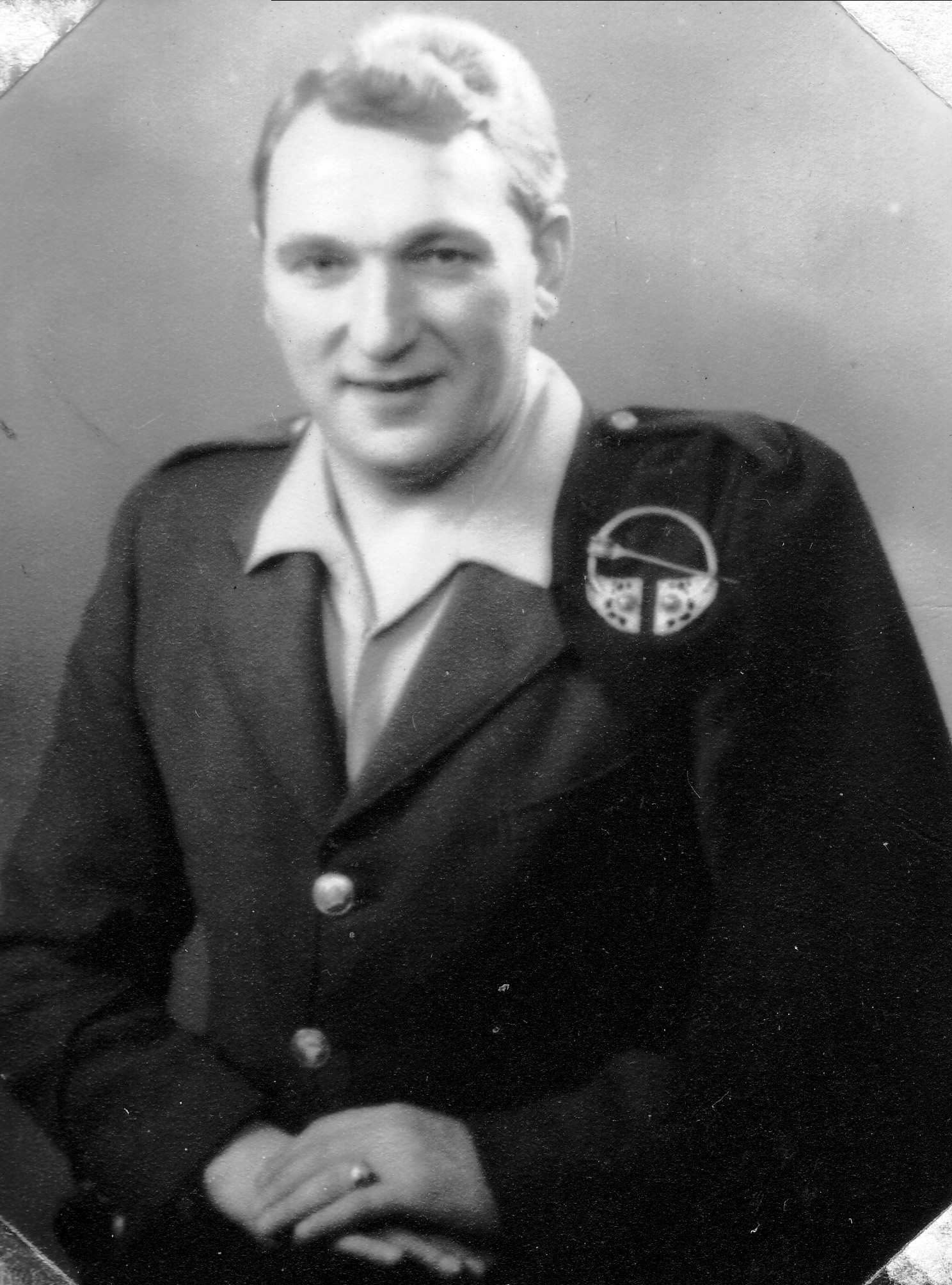
- Crosbie, c. 1942
- Born: John Martin Crosbie; April 7, 1911
- Died: 10 February 1982 (aged 70)
- Occupation: Tenor
- Known for: School Around the Corner; Back To School
- Parents: Martin Crosbie; Lily Corcoran
- Relatives: Paddy Crosbie

Martin Crosbie (7 April 1911 – 10 February 1982) was an Irish tenor and older brother to Paddy Crosbie of The School Around the Corner. Martin, who was affectionately known as "The Miller's daughter", a song he made his own, started in show business in his early 1930s.

== Life ==
The eldest in a family of four, he was christened John Martin but was known as Mossy to his family and friends. His mother and father came from Wexford town. His father, Martin, was a foreman-fitter and turner on the Permanent way, that is the tracks section, of the old Dublin United Tramways. Before coming to Dublin, his father had earned quite a reputation in his native town, both as a singer and comedian. He won the Wexford Feis gold medal in 1904 in the tenor competition. Martin's paternal grandmother was reputed to have had a three-octave voice, and sang in Bride Street Church (Church of the Assumption), Wexford. Before his singing career began, he worked as a fitter/mechanic in CIE's Summerhill depot.

"One night in the late 1930s himself and the legendary Billy Morton went to a show in the Olympia. In the bar during the interval Billy and other friends talked him into singing a song. One song led to another and soon there were more people in the bar than in the audience. The manager came in and said if he could keep an audience away from the show he should be able to keep them in their seats the following week. That's how he joined Lorcan Bourke Productions. Martin caused a bit of stir the next Monday night when he cycled to the Olympia, walked through the stage door, hung up his bicycle clips, and went straight out on stage to sing. I didn't know anything then about using dressing-rooms and make-up he had laughed."

His CIE supervisor gave him a couple of months leave of absence to pursue singing, during which Martin became a star of variety at the Royal and the Capitol where the "Miller's Daughter" legend was born in 1942.

It was when he was playing in Belfast with Harry Bailey that he met Thelma Ramsey, who would become his wife. When he came back to the Royal in Dublin, Thelma was the accompanist. They toured with some of showbiz's big names, including famous comic Max Miller. They missed out on playing the London Palladium with Max as he was allowed to bring only one other act. A halfpenny was tossed and they lost. "Imagine losing the Palladium with a halfpenny… wouldn't have minded had it been half-a-crown!"

A regular in the Clontarf Castle Cabaret from 1964, he continued to perform six nights a week even when his health started to fail him in the early 1980s. In 1979, he received the Variety Artists' Trust Society award for his contribution to Irish show business. He made numerous television appearances, some of which still survive on R.T.E. and Ulster Television etc. He was a member of Equity and appeared in small parts in most of the Films made in Ireland at that time.

== Films ==
- Sinful Davey – 1969 – Sinful Davey (Movie Clip) The Condemned Man
- Davey (John Hurt) and McNab (Ronald Fraser) are attempting to swipe the corpse of hanged Tom Pepper when they encounter the authorities,(i.e. Martin as one of the Constables ) in John Huston's comedy of 19th century Scotland, Sinful Davey, 1969.
- Of human bondage – (1964) Lab Technician
- A Bus Ride To Success – He played a bus conductor
- Young Cassidy – (1965) – 2nd Hearseman Young Cassidy clips
- Underground – (1970) R.A.F. Sergeant Underground (1970)
- Quackser Fortune has a Cousin in the Bronx (1973) – Policeman
- Lockup Your Daughters (1969) Lock-Up-Your-Daughters
- The Spy Who Came in From The Cold (1965) { As a stand in for Richard Burton }

== Death ==
Martin Crosbie died on 10 February 1982 from cancer. He is buried in Glasnevin Cemetery Dublin. A special Tribute Show was held in The Olympia on Sunday 28 February by his friends in show business – Listed as they appeared on the bill.

- Al Banim
- Billie Barry Dancers
- David Beggs
- Chris Casey
- Paddy Crosbie
- Val Fitzpatrick
- Val Joyce
- Tony Kenny
- Jack Leonard
- Sean Mooney
- Vera Morgan
- Kathy Nugent
- Pat & Jean
- Maureen Potter
- Shamrog
- Des Smyth
