= Deirdre Donnelly =

Irish actress

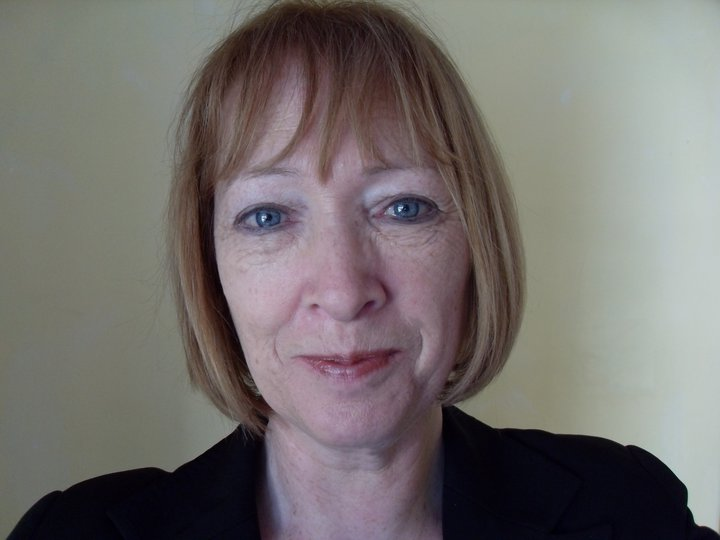
- Born: 1950 (age 75–76); Dublin, Ireland
- Education: Abbey Theatre School; University College Dublin (BA, MA)
- Occupation: Actress
- Years active: 1971–present
- Awards: Irish Theatre Award (nomination)

Deirdre Donnelly is an Irish actress of stage and screen. Best known for her work on television, from 1975 to 1979 she portrayed Kathy Peters on the long-running RTÉ drama serial The Riordans. From 1996-2001 she starred as Siobhan Mehigan on the BBC comedy-drama series Ballykissangel. She has had recurring roles on Vikings: Valhalla, Fair City, Brassic, The Virtues, Striking Out, The Frankenstein Chronicles, The Clinic, The Irish R.M., and Last of the Summer Wine.

Donnelly made her film debut in Academy Award winner Joseph Strick’s 1977 film A Portrait of the Artist as a Young Man, adapted from the James Joyce novel of the same name. She would go on to have supporting roles in Attracta, The Fantasist, The Lilac Bus, Cracks, Rialto, and Barber. Also a veteran stage actress, Donnelly has appeared in numerous plays, including more than 50 productions with the National Theatre of Ireland.

== Early life ==
Donnelly is the third of four daughters. Her father was from Rathfarnham, Co. Dublin, and her mother from Castleblaney, Co. Monaghan. Her sister Terry Donnelly is also an actress.

Donnelly grew up in Cullenswood House, Ranelagh, and was educated at Mount St. Anne's School in Milltown, South Dublin. She studied for two years at the Brendan Smith Theatre Academy and a further two years at the Abbey Theatre School of Acting.

In 2004, Donnelly completed postgraduate studies at UCD, receiving a first-class master's degree in Modern Drama Studies.

== Credits ==
=== Theatre ===
Year	Title	Role	Playwright	Venue	Ref.
1969	The Assassin	Housewife	John Boyd	Dublin Theatre Festival	
1971	Today The Bullfinch	Ensemble	Jack White	Abbey Theatre	
1971	Hall of Healing	Old Woman	Sean O'Casey	Abbey Theatre	
1971	The Shadow of a Gunman	Stage Manager	Sean O'Casey	Abbey Theatre	
1971	The Blue Demon	Squinch	Lin Ford	Abbey Theatre	
1972	Arrah-na-Pogue	Ensemble	Dion Boucicault	Abbey Theatre	
1972	The Silver Tassie	The Sister of the Ward	Sean O'Casey	Abbey Theatre	
1972	The Blue Demon	Squinch	Lin Ford	Abbey Theatre	
1972	Picnic on a Battlefield	Ensemble	Fernando Arrabal	Abbey Theatre	
1973	The Silver Tassie	The Sister of the Ward	Sean O'Casey	Abbey Theatre	
1973	The Importance of Being Earnest	Hon. Gwendolen Fairfax	Oscar Wilde	Abbey Theatre	
1973	The Scatterin'	Sue Raftery	James McKenna	Abbey Theatre	
1973	Sceal ScealaiíEile	Ensemble	Tomás Mac Anna & Eamon Kelly	Abbey Theatre	
1973	The Doll In The Gap	Ellen	Helen Cahill	Abbey Theatre	
1973	Rites	Woman	Maureen Duffy	Abbey Theatre	
1973	In the Shadow of the Glen	Nora Burke	John Millington Synge	Abbey Theatre	
1974	The Resistible Rise of Arturo Ui	Ensemble	Bertolt Brecht & George Tabori	Abbey Theatre	
1974	The Whiteheaded Boy	Jane	Lennox Robinson	Abbey Theatre	
1974	Blood Wedding	The Bride	Federico García Lorca	Abbey Theatre	
1974	The Whiteheaded Boy	Jane	Lennox Robinson	Abbey Theatre	
1974	The Gathering	Carmel	Edna O'Brien	Abbey Theatre	
1974	The Vicar of Wakefield	Miss Wilmot	Oliver Goldsmith & Thomas Murphy	Abbey Theatre	
1974	Struensee	Lady/Whore	John MacKendrick	Abbey Theatre	
1975	Tarry Flynn	Mary/Birdie	P. J. O'Connor & Patrick Kavanagh	Abbey Theatre	
1975	The Vicar of Wakefield	Miss Wilmot	Oliver Goldsmith & Thomas Murphy	Abbey Theatre	
1975	Tarry Flynn	Mary	P. J. O'Connor & Patrick Kavanagh	Abbey Theatre	
1975	Twelfth Night	Olivia	William Shakespeare	Abbey Theatre	
1975	A Short Walk to the Sea	Toni O'Mahoney	Desmond Hogan	Abbey Theatre	
1975	Witches Brew	Princess Red	Lin Ford	Abbey Theatre	
1976	The J. Arthur Maginnis Story	Chrissie Daftigan	Tom Murphy	Irish Theatre Company	
1977	Catchpenny Twist	Monagh Cahoon	Stewart Parker	Abbey Theatre	
1977	As You Like It	Rosalind	William Shakespeare	Gaiety Theatre	
1978	As You Like It	Rosalind	William Shakespeare	Irish Theatre Company, National Tour	
1979	The Well of the Saints	Molly Byrne	John Millington Synge	Abbey Theatre	
1979	Epitaph Under Ether	4th Woman	Thomas Murphy	Abbey Theatre	
1979	Crooked in the Car Seat	Helen Crowe	Brian Lynch	Dublin Theatre Festival	
1980	The Blue Macushla	Roscommon	Thomas Murphy	Abbey Theatre	
1981	The Scythe and the Sunset	Emer Nic Ghabhann	Denis Johnston	Abbey Theatre	
1981	Scenes from an Album	Honoria	William Trevor	Abbey Theatre	
1981	All My Sons	Ann Deever	Arthur Miller	Abbey Theatre	
1981	Not I	Mouth	Samuel Beckett	Abbey Theatre	
1983	Boesman and Lena	Lena	Athol Fugard	Field Day Theatre Company	
1989	Too Late For Logic	Monica	Tom Murphy	Abbey Theatre	
1989	You Can't Take It With You	Gay Wellington	George S. Kaufman & Moss Hart	Abbey Theatre	
1994	Down Onto Blue	Julie Fox	Pom Boyd	Project Arts Centre	
1995	She Stoops to Conquer	Kate Hardcastle	Oliver Goldsmith	Gate Theatre	
1996	She Stoops To Folly	Mrs. Primrose	Tom Murphy	Abbey Theatre	
2002	Da	Mrs. Prynne	Hugh Leonard	Abbey Theatre	
2005	Nuts and Bolts	Marie	Fiona Looney	Bewley’s Cafe Theatre	
2006	A Month in the Country	Anna Semyonovna Islayeva	Ivan Turgenev & Brian Friel	Abbey Theatre	
2006	Dream of Autumn	Mother	Jon Fosse	Project Arts Centre	
2007	The Crucible	Rebecca Nurse	Arthur Miller	Abbey Theatre	
2007	The Big House	Mrs. Alcock	Lennox Robinson	Abbey Theatre	
2008	An Ideal Husband	Lady Markby	Oscar Wilde	Abbey Theatre	
2009	Moment	Teresa	Deirdre Kinahan	Solstice Arts Centre	
2010	Bookworms	Dorothy	Bernard Farrell	Abbey Theatre	
2010	Death of a Salesman	Linda Loman	Arthur Miller	Gate Theatre	
2011	Little Women	Aunt March	Louisa May Alcott & Anne-Marie Casey	Gate Theatre	
2012	Bookworms	Dorothy	Bernard Farrell	Abbey Theatre	
2013	Sush	Breda	Elaine Murphy	Abbey Theatre	
2013	Sush	Breda	Elaine Murphy	Abbey Theatre, National Tour	
2014	Of This Brave Time	Performer	Jimmy Murphy	Abbey Theatre	
2014	Conservatory	She	Michael West	Abbey Theatre	
2014	Owners	Alec's Mother	Caryl Churchill	Abbey Theatre	
2015	Pride and Prejudice	Lady Catherine de Bourgh	Jane Austen	Gate Theatre / Hong Kong Arts Festival	
2016	Donegal - A Musical Play	Magdalene Carolan	Frank McGuinness	Abbey Theatre	
2016	The Importance of Being Earnest	Lady Bracknell	Oscar Wilde	Gate Theatre / Spoleto Festival USA	
2019	'Evening Train	Kathleen	Mick Flannery	Everyman Palace Theatre	
2020	A Letter To The Manager	Performer	Sonya Kelly	Abbey Theatre	
2022	Joyce's Women	May Joyce	Edna O'Brien	Abbey Theatre	

== Film and television roles ==
- The Riordans (1974 - TV Series - RTE) as Cathy.
- The Last of Summer (1978 - TV Series - RTE) as Jo.
- Farmers (1978 - TV Drama - RTE) as Nuala.
- Miracles and Miss Langan (1979 - TV Drama - RTE) as Miss Langan.
- Criminal Conversation (1981 - Feature Film - BAC Films) as Margaret.
- Painted Out (1982 - TV Drama - RTE) as Maura Doyle.
- Attracta (1983 - Feature Film - BAC Films) as Geraldine Carey.
- The Irish RM (1984-85 - TV Series - RTE/Channel 4) as Miss Fraser.
- The Fantasist (1986 - Feature Film - ITC Films) as Fionnuala O'Sullivan.
- Molloy (1989 - TV Series - RTE) as Mrs. Molloy.
- Connemara (aka La Rouge) (1990 - Feature Film - Lapaca Films) as La Reine.
- The Hamster Wheel (1993 - TV Drama - BBC NI) as Jeanette.
- Runway One (1995 - V Drama - BBC) as Mrs. Connaughton.
- Ballykissangel (1996-2001 - TV Series - World Productions/BBC) as Siobhan.
- Legend (2006 - TV Series - RTE) as Bernie Molloy.
- The Clinic (2006-07 - TV Series - RTE) as Carol O'Dwyer.
- Cracks (2009 - Feature Film - Scott Free/Element Pictures) as Miss Lacey.
- Homemade (2012 - Short Film - Park Films) as Joan.
- Quirke (2014 - TV Series - BBC/RTE) as Sister Dominic.
- Amber (2015 - TV Series - RTE) as Maureen O'Donoghue.
- The Frankenstein Chronicles (2015 - TV Series - ITV) as Mrs. Townsend.
- Goodbye, Darling (2016 - Short Film - Fantastic Films) as Kathleen.
- Striking Out (2017 - TV Series - Blinder Films/RTE) - as Judge O'Sullivan.
- The Lonely Battle of Thomas Reid (2018 - Feature Film - Park Films) as Supreme Court Judge.
- The Virtues (2019 - TV Series - Warp Films/Channel 4) as Susan.
- Rialto (2019 - TV Series - Marcie Films) as Miriam.
- The Ferry (2019 - Short Film - Media Factory) as Bertha.
- Brassic (2019 - TV Series - Calamity Films/ Sky 1) as Mo Dennings.
- The Lady on the Hill (aka The Bog Lady) (2019 - Short Film - Red Spider Films) as The Mother.
- Fair City (2023 - RTE Soap Opera) as Jacinta Boyle.
