= Cecil Sheridan =

Irish comedian and actor (1910–1980)

- Born: 21 December 1910; Dublin, Ireland
- Died: 4 January 1980 (aged 69); Dublin, Ireland
- Notable work: "Hannigan's Hooley" (song)
- Spouse: Ann Doyle

Comedy career
- Years active: 1937–1978
- Medium: Revue, pantomime, film
- Genre: Parody

Cecil Sheridan (21 December 1910 – 4 January 1980) was an Irish comedian and actor who performed in variety shows and pantomimes in Ireland and Great Britain during a versatile career spanning over forty years.

== Early life ==
Born at 31 Queen's Square, Sheridan was the son of a Dublin upholsterer, also named Cecil, and his wife, Catherine (Kate) Buckley. His mother died of tuberculosis when he was six and he and his siblings were raised by his father. He was educated at Synge Street CBS. In a bid to cure a stammer he sought opportunities to perform in public. He made his stage debut at the age of twenty when he won £100 in a talent show. However, he continued to work in his father's business until 1937 when, after winning another talent contest, he decided to become a full-time stage performer.

== Career ==
Sheridan's performances in revues, variety shows, and pantomimes kept the spirit of the old music hall and vaudeville alive on the Dublin stage well into the era of television.

He performed frequently at Dublin's Queen's Theatre from 1940 onwards, and he appeared also on the stage of the Theatre Royal, Dublin. In 1976, he was deemed by The Irish Times to have "stolen the show" when he performed his own songs in Noel Pearson's production of You Ain't Heard Nuttin' Yet at the Gaiety Theatre, Dublin. He was a regular at the Olympia Theatre, Dublin, and was one of the leaders of the campaign to raise funds for the theatre's restoration following the collapse of the proscenium arch in 1974. He appeared in the first show to be staged at the Olympia when it reopened in March 1977.

Sheridan wrote his own material, including pantomimes. Three days before his version of Snow White and the Seven Dwarfs was due to begin its run, he learnt that Walt Disney's feature-length cartoon of the same name was about to open at a nearby cinema. He set to work immediately on a new pantomime, Mother Goose, and had it ready for its first performance on the date planned for Snow White. His clever use of wordplay earned him the title of "Parody King". One of his most famous parodies was a play on the song "Let The Rest of the World Go By". He also wrote humorous songs, notably "Hannigan's Hooley".

Sheridan toured Scotland with Andy Stewart and performed at the Metropole Theatre in London.

As an actor Sheridan appeared in a number of stage plays including the world première of Brian Friel's Crystal and Fox, in which he played the supporting role of Pedro in a Hilton Edwards production at the Gaiety Theatre. He was also among the cast of several films shot in Ireland, for instance, Ulysses and Where's Jack?. One of his more unusual acting roles came in 1966 when he portrayed the trade union leader, James Larkin, in a pageant staged in Croke Park to commemorate the Irish struggle for independence.

One of Sheridan's last live appearances was in The Heart's A Wonder, a musical based on John Millington Synge's Playboy of the Western World, which was staged at Limerick's Crescent Theatre in September 1978.

Sheridan's writings form part of the Irish Theatre Archive held at the Dublin City Archive.

== Personal life ==
Sheridan's wife, Ann ("Nan") Doyle, predeceased him in 1978. Towards the end of his life he credited her with restoring his Catholic faith, which had lapsed during his bachelor days. They had three children, a son, Noel, who was director of Dublin's National College of Art and Design, and two daughters, Ann and Barbara. Cecil Sheridan died aged 69 and is buried in Mount Jerome Cemetery.

== Filmography ==
Year	Title	Role	Notes
1967	Ulysses	John Henry Menton	
1967	The Viking Queen	Shopkeeper at Protest Gathering	
1973	Catholics	Brother Malachy	
