= Pearse Square =

Garden square in Dublin, Ireland

Coordinates: 53.3434°N 6.2421°W

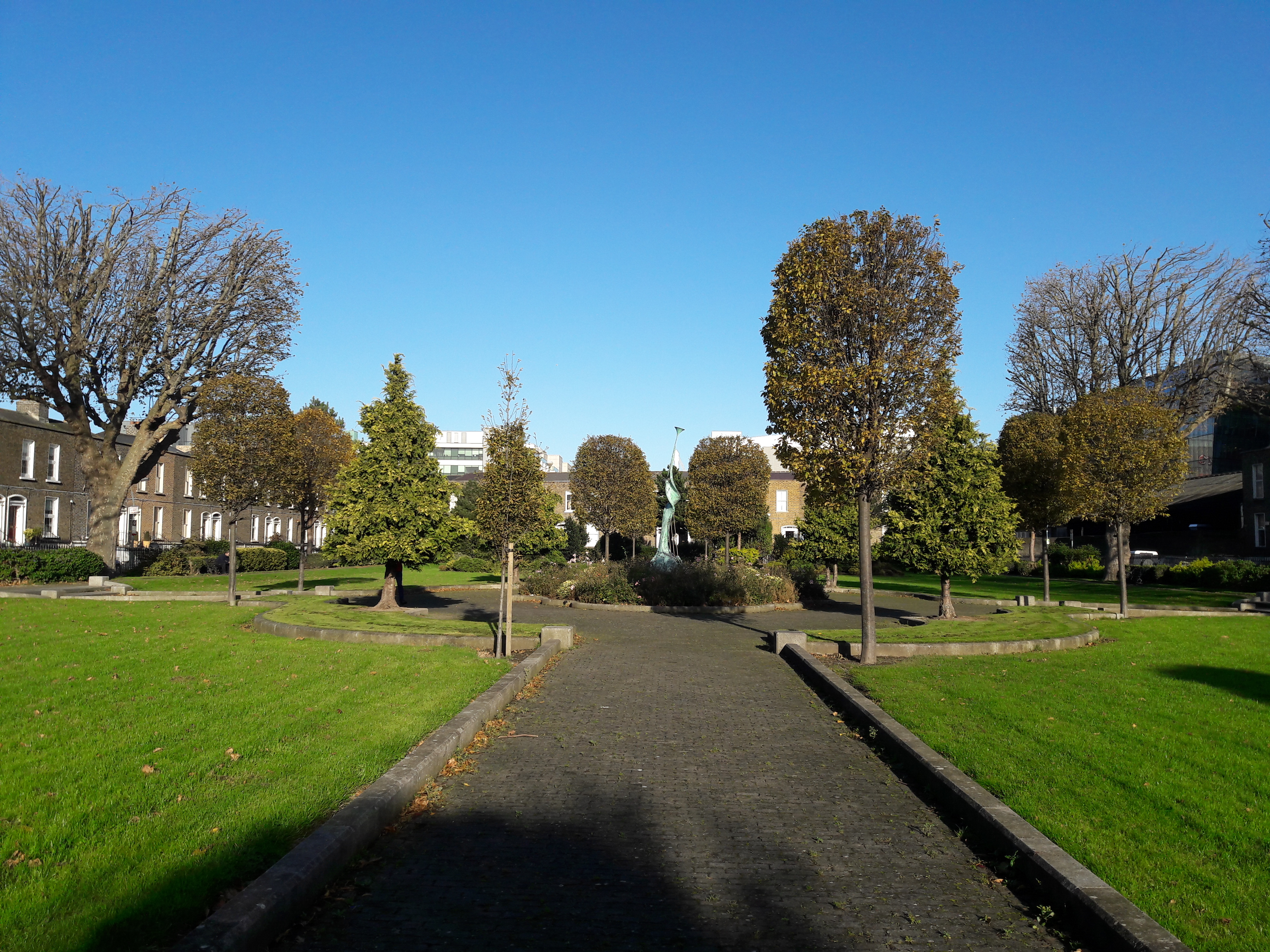
- Pearse Square, November 2017
- Interactive map of Pearse Square
- Location: Dublin, Ireland
- Area: 1.35 acres (0.55 ha)
- Created: 1839
- Operator: Dublin City Council

Pearse Square (Irish: Cearnóg an Phiarsaigh) is a Georgian garden square in Dublin, Ireland. It is bounded on its southern side by Pearse Street.

== History ==
Originally named Queen's Square after the newly crowned British Queen Victoria, the square consists of 48 houses, built between 1838 and 1855. The park at the centre of the square was in private ownership until the late 1880s, when it was purchased by Dublin Corporation for £200. The Corporation added a bandstand and landscaped the park as a Victorian pleasure garden which opened to the public on 23 April 1889. It was renamed Pearse Square in 1926, in honour of the Irish political activist Patrick Pearse. In the 1940s, the park was remodelled to include a playground and tarmac sports area.

The square was a popular residence for actors in the late 19th and early 20th centuries, due to its proximity to the Queen's Royal Theatre on Pearse Street and the Theatre Royal on Hawkins Street.

The Dublin South Docks Festival Fair has been held in the square.

== Design ==
The houses on the square are 2 storeys over basement. The park in the centre of the square is approximately 0.5 hectares (1.24 acres) in size. The sunken cruciform path contains Wicklow granite. Pearse Street and Pearse Square are built on land reclaimed from the River Liffey; as a result, the area is prone to flooding.

== Refurbishment ==
In 1991, Dublin City Council Parks Division applied for European Union (EU) funding to renovate the square. Although EU funding was refused, the Council itself funded a £100,000 refurbishment of the square in 1996 using a design based on the formal layout from an 1838 Ordnance Survey map of the area. The square was re-opened on 2 July 1998 by the then-Lord Mayor of Dublin, John Stafford. The park features a 3.5m bronze sculpture by Sandra Bell titled "Harmony", which was designed based on stories from the Pearse Square residents.
