= Our Boys (disambiguation) =

Our Boys may refer to:

- Our Boys, a play by Henry James Byron, first performed in London in 1875
- Our Boys (1993 play), a play by Jonathan Guy Lewis
- Our Boys Institute, a junior branch of YMCA Adelaide, Australia
- Our Boys (magazine), a boys' magazine published monthly by the Irish Christian Brothers in Ireland between 1914 and 1990
- Our Boys (miniseries), a 2019 American-Israeli HBO television miniseries
- Dundee Our Boys F.C., a former football club in Dundee, Scotland
- Maa Babu (lit. 'Our Boy'), a 1960 Indian Telugu-language drama by T. Prakash Rao
