= Peggy Dell =

Irish singer and pianist (1906–1979)

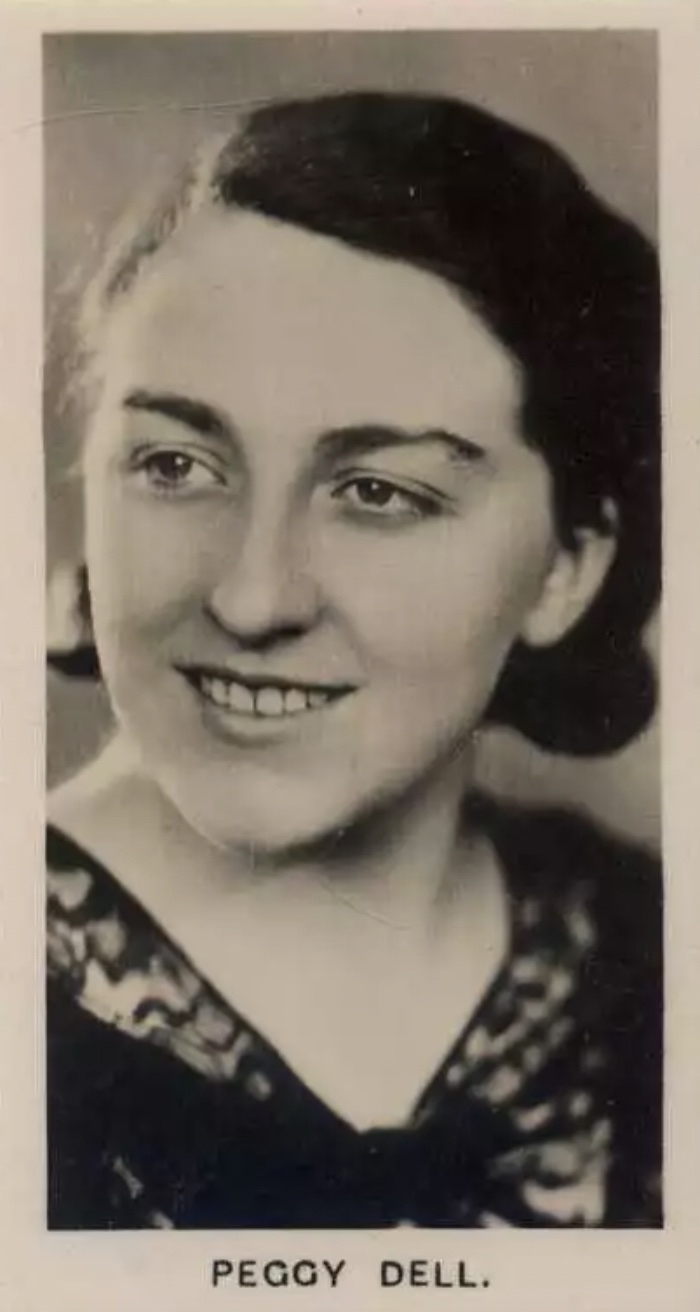
Peggy Dell in 1935

Margaret Tisdall (8 January 1906 – 30 April 1979), better known by her stage name Peggy Dell, was an Irish singer and pianist who became a popular music hall entertainer.

Born in Dublin, Tisdall made her first public appearance as a pianist at the age of nine at the Olympia Theatre, where her father played flute with the pit orchestra. Later, at the age of 13, she was employed by Woolworth to play at their store in Grafton Street in order to improve the sales of sheet music.

While still in her teens Tisdall formed her own band which played at various Dublin venues, such as the Theatre Royal and the Capitol Theatre. In the 1930s, Tisdall toured England with Roy Fox and his band, during which time she adopted the stage name, Peggy Dell. Later, she performed in the United States as the lead singer with the Jack Hylton band. Following the outbreak of World War II she returned to Ireland and re-established herself as a popular musician and entertainer there. She played and sang at dances, performed in revues, and acted in pantomimes.

By the end of the 1960s, due to the closure of several major Dublin theatres and the advent of television, Dell's career had gone into decline. Then, in 1973, Gay Byrne asked her to take part in a special edition of The Late Late Show in honour of actor Noel Purcell. Viewer reaction was so positive that she was given her own TV series on RTÉ called Peg O' My Heart. In February 1975, she won a Jacob's Award for the programme. From then until her death, Dell enjoyed renewed success as an entertainer, performing regularly on radio and television, as well as making live appearances. In 1975 she released an album entitled Among My Souvenirs.

Peggy Dell never married or had any children. She died in Dublin aged 73 and is buried in Glasnevin Cemetery. Her headstone was erected in 2022 following a fundraiser.^
