= Blarney (disambiguation) =

Blarney is a town and townland in County Cork, Ireland.

Blarney may also refer to:

- Blarney (1926 film), an American silent film
- Blarney (1938 film), a British comedy film
- 2320 Blarney, a main-belt asteroid
- Blarney (code name), an American communications surveillance program

== See also ==
- Blarney Castle, in Blarney
- Blarney Stone, a legendary stone at Blarney Castle
- Blarney United F.C., Irish amateur football club
