= Jack Cruise =

Irish comedian and actor

Jack Cruise (15 August 1915 – 4 May 1979) was an Irish comedian, entertainer and actor, who performed in and wrote many shows in the Royal and Olympia theatres in Dublin.

== Early life ==
Born in Phibsborough, Dublin to Michael Cruise (born Colchester, Essex in 1865) and Brigid O'Kelly (born Tralee, County Kerry in 1880). He attended St. Vincent's C.B.S. in Glasnevin, Dublin. On leaving secondary school in 1933, he joined the well-known Dublin bakers, Peter Kennedy & Sons, as a trainee ledger clerk. He had been interested in acting and drama from an early age and he joined the A.O.H. Players in 1934 and played with many of the leading amateur drama groups in the city in the following years. In 1936 while performing in the pantomime Jack and the Beanstalk with the Fr. Matthew Players he created what was to become one of his favourite characters – John Joe Mahockey from Ballyslapdashamuckery – an astute countryman, or culchie to use the Dublin expression, who wore a flat cap with an enormous peak, navy blue suit, white shirt, red tie and a large pair of brown hobnailed boots.

Cruise was a first cousin of the Irish portrait painter Leo Whelan.

== Queen's Theatre ==
He performed initially in the Queen's Theatre and while appearing there he was recommended to Noel Purcell, then a Theatre Royal star. Shortly afterwards he began performing and writing scripts for the weekly variety shows the Royal was renowned for.

== Theatre Royal ==
He eventually left Kennedys bakery in 1945 to work full-time in the Theatre Royal where he had been appointed house manager and press officer. That Christmas he played in the pantomime Mother Goose with Noel Purcell, Eddie Byrne, Frankie Blowers, Sean Mooney and Pauline Forbes whose father Dick wrote the show. The show also featured The Royalettes and the Theatre's orchestra conducted by Jimmy Campbell. In the five weeks run it was seen by 231,000 citizens. It was described by Dublin Theatre critic John Finegan as "Dublin's greatest panto".

He performed in the Theatre Royal regularly up to the late 1940s when theatrical work in the city took a downturn. He returned to the Royal in the early 1950s and performed regularly until its closure in 1962.

In the Theatre Royal's 1951/52 offering, Robinson Crusoe which opened on 23 December, the production featured Eddie Byrne as Captain Hook (a bad bad pirate), Jack Cruise and Harry Bailey as Wette and Windee (two old salts) and Noel Purcell as Ma Crusoe (a merry widow). With eighteen named players plus the Royalettes and assorted specialty acts, the eleven scene presentation took the Irish Clipper to Neptune's Domain and the Island of Golden Palms, thereby allowing Ma Crusoe to discover the Lollipop Tree.

He set up his own import-export agency until a new opportunity presented itself. In 1948, Billy Butlin opened his Irish holiday camp in Mosney, County Meath. Three years later, Jack was offered the summer variety season there and for the following eight years he produced 80 different shows for the patrons.

== Olympia Theatre ==
The Olympia Theatre closed between February 1964 and August 1964. It had been sold to a group of London-Irish publicans who had an idea of converting it into a cabaret-restaurant. The Corporation refused and Jack Cruise, Lorcan Bourke, Richard Hallinan and founder of The Dublin Theatre Festival, Brendan Smith took over the theatre on a six months lease. The first show was a revue Holiday Hayride with Cruise, which did better business than any other show in the history of the Olympia up until that time.

Some of the pantomimes he directed at the Olympia were:

- Aladdin (1964)
- Jack in the Box, Jack Cruise (1970)
- Aladdin and the Wonderful Lamp, Jack Cruise Productions (1972)
- Cinderella, Jack Cruise Productions
- Ring Out the Bells, Jack Cruise Productions

== Latter Years ==
Jack Cruise was one of the last performers to survive the increasing influence of television, managing the successful Holiday Hayride productions throughout the 1960s and 70s. His final production was the pantomime Aladdin at the Olympia Theatre on Christmas 1978. In 1979 he had agreed to produce and appear in Summer revue in Butlin's Mosney but he died in May 1979. As per the old theatre adage "the show must go on", Dublin Comedian Danny Cummins stood in for Cruise and the shows in Butlin's went ahead.
