= Biddy Mulligan the Pride of the Coombe =

Biddy Mulligan the Pride of the Coombe (sometimes just called Biddy Mulligan) is a song written by Seamus Kavanagh in the 1930s, and made famous by Jimmy O'Dea.

The songwriter Seamus Kavanagh collaborated with the scriptwriter Harry O'Donovan, who in turn had formed a partnership with Jimmy O'Dea. Kavanagh based this piece on the song The Queen Of The Royal Coombe, which he had found in a 19th-century Theatre Royal programme. Other similarly themed songs also performed by O'Dea were The Charladies' Ball and Daffy the Belle of the Coombe, concerning Biddy Mulligan's daughter.
