= Victor O'Donovan Power =

Victor O'Donovan Power (1860 – 30 December 1933) was an Irish playwright, novelist, and prolific short-story writer.

He was born at Rosbercon, County Kilkenny. His mother was a poet from West Cork, his father was a nationalist. He was educated at Carlow College. He started writing and contributing stories to magazines while still a teen-ager. His best-known creation is the woman of the roads, Kitty the Hare, "the most remarkable person that ever graced the pages of Ireland's Own" (Con Houlihan), who first made her appearance in Our Boys in November 1924. His short stories were reprinted many times in Ireland's Own and Our Boys. He is buried in Shanbogh graveyard.

== Select works ==
- A Secret of the Past (London: Ward & Downey, 1893)
- Bonnie Dunraven: A Story of Kilcarrick (London: Remington, 1881)
- The Heir of Liscarragh (Leamington: Art & Book Co., 1892) – produced in October 1923 at the Abbey Theatre, with Harry O'Donovan and Frank O'Donovan.
- Tracked (Dublin, 1914)
- The Footsteps of Fate (Dublin, 1930)
- Some Strange Experiences of Kitty the Hare – The Famous Travelling Woman of Ireland, Mercier Press, Dublin, 1987, ISBN 9780853427995
