= Theatre Royal, Dublin =

Name of five different theatres in Dublin

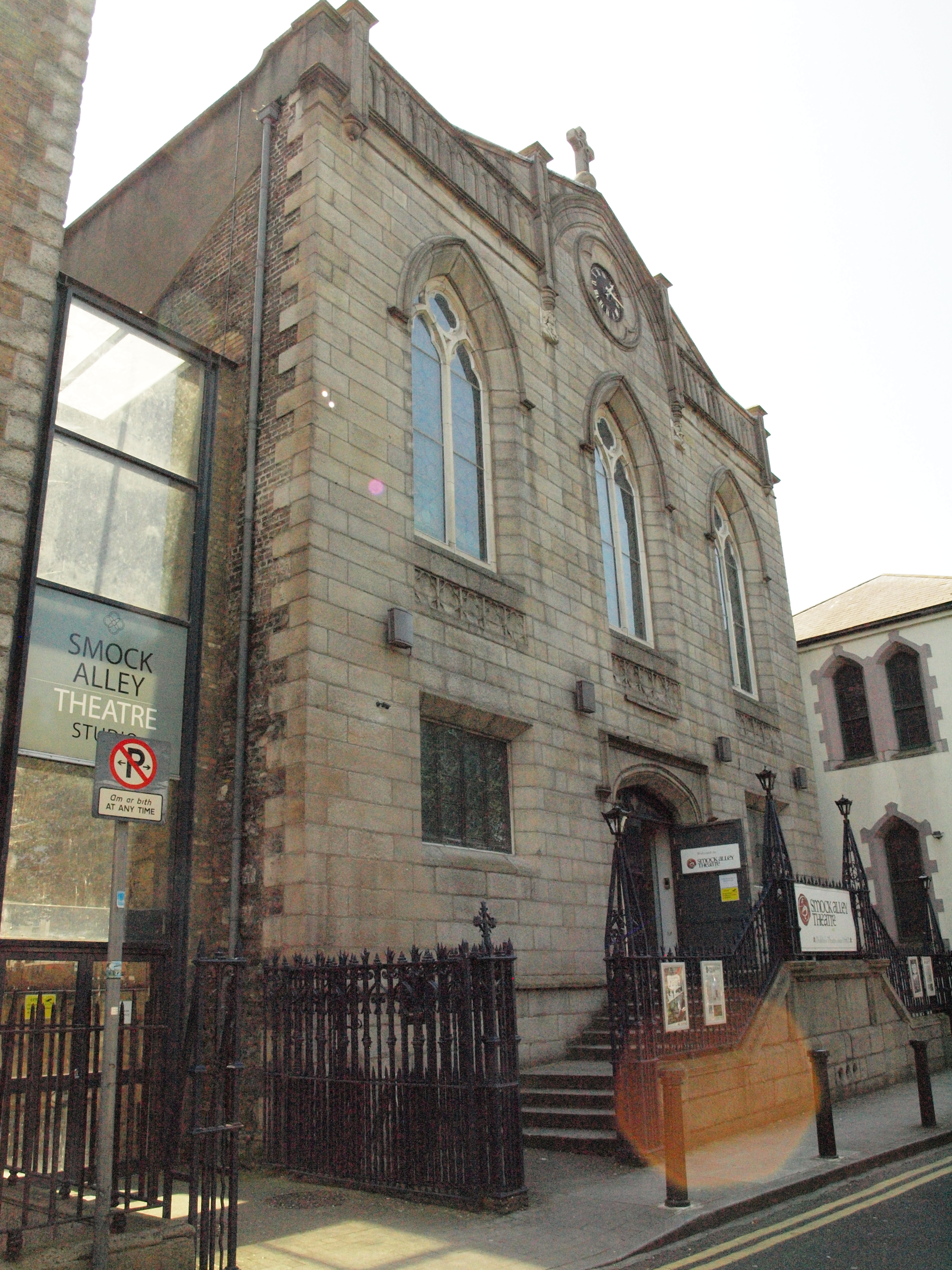
The Smock Alley Theatre, Dublin, on the site of the first Theatre Royal

Over the centuries, there have been five theatres in Dublin called the Theatre Royal.

In the history of the theatre in Great Britain and Ireland, the designation "Theatre Royal", or "Royal Theatre", once meant that a theatre had been granted a royal patent, without which "serious drama" theatrical performances were not permitted by law. Many such theatres had other names.

== The first Theatre Royal (1662–1787) ==
The first Theatre Royal was opened by John Ogilby in 1662 in Smock Alley. Ogilby, who was the first Irish Master of the Revels, had previously run the New Theatre in Werburgh Street. This was the first custom-built theatre in the city. It opened in 1637 but was closed by the Puritans in 1641. The Restoration of the monarchy in Ireland in 1661 enabled Ogilby to resume his position as Master of the Revels and open his new venture.

This Theatre Royal was essentially under the control of the administration in Dublin Castle and staged mainly pro-Stuart works and Shakespearean classics.

In 1662, Katherine Philips went to Dublin to pursue her husband's claim to certain Irish estates; there she completed a translation of Pierre Corneille's Pompée, produced with great success in 1663 in the Smock Alley Theatre, and printed in the same year both in Dublin and London. Although other women had translated or written dramas, her translation of Pompey broke new ground as the first rhymed version of a French tragedy in English and the first English play written by a woman to be performed on the professional stage.

In the 18th century, the theatre was managed for a time by the actor-manager Thomas Sheridan, the father of playwright and politician Richard Brinsley Sheridan. Thomas Sheridan managed to attract major stars of the London stage, including David Garrick and the Dublin-born Peg Woffington. Charlotte Melmoth, later to become 'The Grande Dame of Tragedy on the American Stage' began her acting career at Smock Alley. The theatre was demolished and rebuilt in 1735 and closed in 1787, falling into dereliction and used as a warehouse for almost 30 years.

In 1811, part of the 18th-century structure was demolished, and what survived was incorporated into the new Church of St. Michael and St. Johns, which remained as one of the most popular Catholic churches in the city centre until 1989. In 2012, after 6 years of building work, the 19th-century church building was converted for use as a theatre. The new theatre is home to the Gaiety School of Acting, The National Theatre School of Ireland.

== The second Theatre Royal (1788–1818) ==
Crow Street Theatre was opened by Spranger Barry in 1758. The lovers Mary Bulkley and James William Dodd played here in 1774. In 1782 the actor Richard Daly became its owner, and in 1786, having obtained a patent from the Crown, he opened the theatre in 1788 as the Theatre Royal. £12,000 had been spent on rebuilding and decoration. It was profitable for a while, but later suffered from the opening of Astley's Amphitheatre.

Frederick Edward Jones leased the theatre from Daly, and spent £1200 on renovating the house, which was decorated by Marinari and Zaffarini. It was opened in 1796 but closed when martial law was declared, relating to the Irish Rebellion of 1798. Jones obtained a new royal patent in 1798, and spent a further £5000 on the theatre, but in the political climate, it had to close in 1803.

The theatre was wrecked in a riot in 1814, and there were further riots in 1819. Jones attributed his unpopularity to his being active in politics; in 1807 he had supported the election of an anti-ministerial member of parliament for Dublin. His application in 1818 for renewal of the patent was refused, being granted instead to Henry Harris, a proprietor of Covent Garden Theatre.

== The third Theatre Royal (1821–1880) ==
In 1820, Henry Harris bought a site in Hawkins Street and built the 2,000-seater Albany New Theatre on it at a cost of £50,000, designed by architect Samuel Beazley. This theatre opened in January of the following year. In August, George IV attended a performance at the Albany and, as a consequence, a patent was granted. The name of the theatre was changed to the "Theatre Royal" to reflect its status as a patent theatre. The building work was not completed at the time of opening and early audience figures were so low that a number of side seating boxes were boarded up. On 14 December 1822, the "Bottle Riot" occurred during a performance of She Stoops to Conquer attended by the Lord Lieutenant, Marquess Wellesley: Orangemen angered by Wellesley's conciliation of Catholics jeered him during the national anthem, and a riot ensued after a bottle was thrown at him. Wellesley's overreaction, including charging three rioters with attempted murder, undermined his own credibility.

In 1830, Harris retired from the theatre and a Mr Calcraft took on the lease. This theatre attracted a number of famous performers, including Paganini, Jenny Lind, Tyrone Power and Barry Sullivan. By 1851, the theatre was experiencing financial problems and closed briefly. It reopened in December under John Harris, who had been manager of the rival Queen's Theatre. The first production under Harris was a play by Dion Boucicault. Boucicault and his wife were to make their first Dublin personal appearances in the Royal in 1861 in his The Colleen Bawn. The first performance of Boucicault's play Arrah-na-Pogue was held at the theatre in 1864, with Boucicault, Samuel Johnson, John Brougham and Samuel Anderson Emery in the cast.

This theatre was also noted for its musical performances, which included orchestral overtures and interludes to spoken drama and operatic stagings. The orchestra was conducted by Richard Michael Levey (1811–1899) between 1834 and the burning of the theatre on 9 February 1880. In March 1874, John and Michael Gunn took ownership of the Theatre Royal from John Harris, who had run it for nearly 25 years. John and Michael Gunn remained joint owners of the Gaiety Theatre, but John managed the Gaiety while Michael managed the Theatre Royal.

== The fourth Theatre Royal (1897–1934) ==
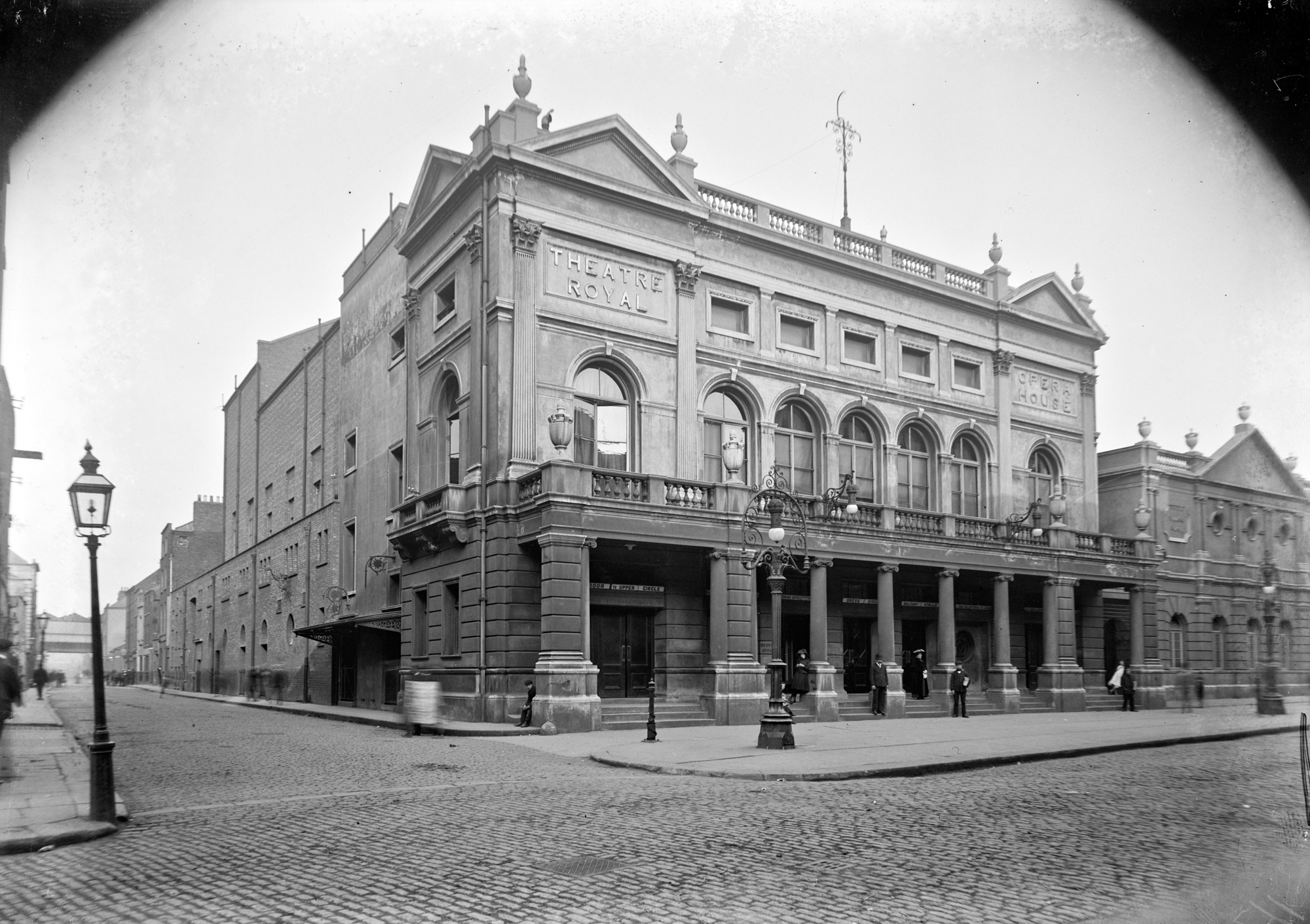
Theatre Royal, Hawkins Street

The fourth Theatre Royal opened on 13 December 1897 by the actor-manager Frederick Mouillot with the assistance of a group of Dublin businessmen. The theatre was designed by Frank Matcham and built on the site of the Leinster Hall theatre, which in turn had been built on the site of the third Theatre Royal. It had seating for an audience of 2,011 people.

This new theatre found itself in competition with the Gaiety Theatre, which prompted Mouillot to try to attract as many big-name stars and companies as possible. At first, the theatre was noted for its opera and musical comedy productions. On 28 April 1904, Edward VII attended a state performance at the theatre.

Mouillot died in 1911 and one of his partners, David Tellford took over the running of the theatre. As musical comedy went out of fashion in the early years of the 20th century, the Royal started to stage music hall shows on a regular basis. In one such show in 1906, a young Charlie Chaplin performed as part of an act called The Eight Lancashire Lads.

One of the most dangerous attacks committed by suffragettes early in their arson and bombing campaign throughout the British Isles, was made on the Theatre Royal in July 1912, carried out by Mary Leigh, Gladys Evans, Lizzie Baker and Mabel Capper, who attempted to set fire to the building during a packed lunchtime matinee attended by British prime minister H. H. Asquith. A canister of gunpowder was left close to the stage and petrol and lit matches were thrown into the projection booth, which contained highly combustible film reels; it exploded as the audience, including Asquith, left the theatre.

In its final years, the Theatre was also used as a cinema. It closed on 3 March 1934 and was demolished soon after.

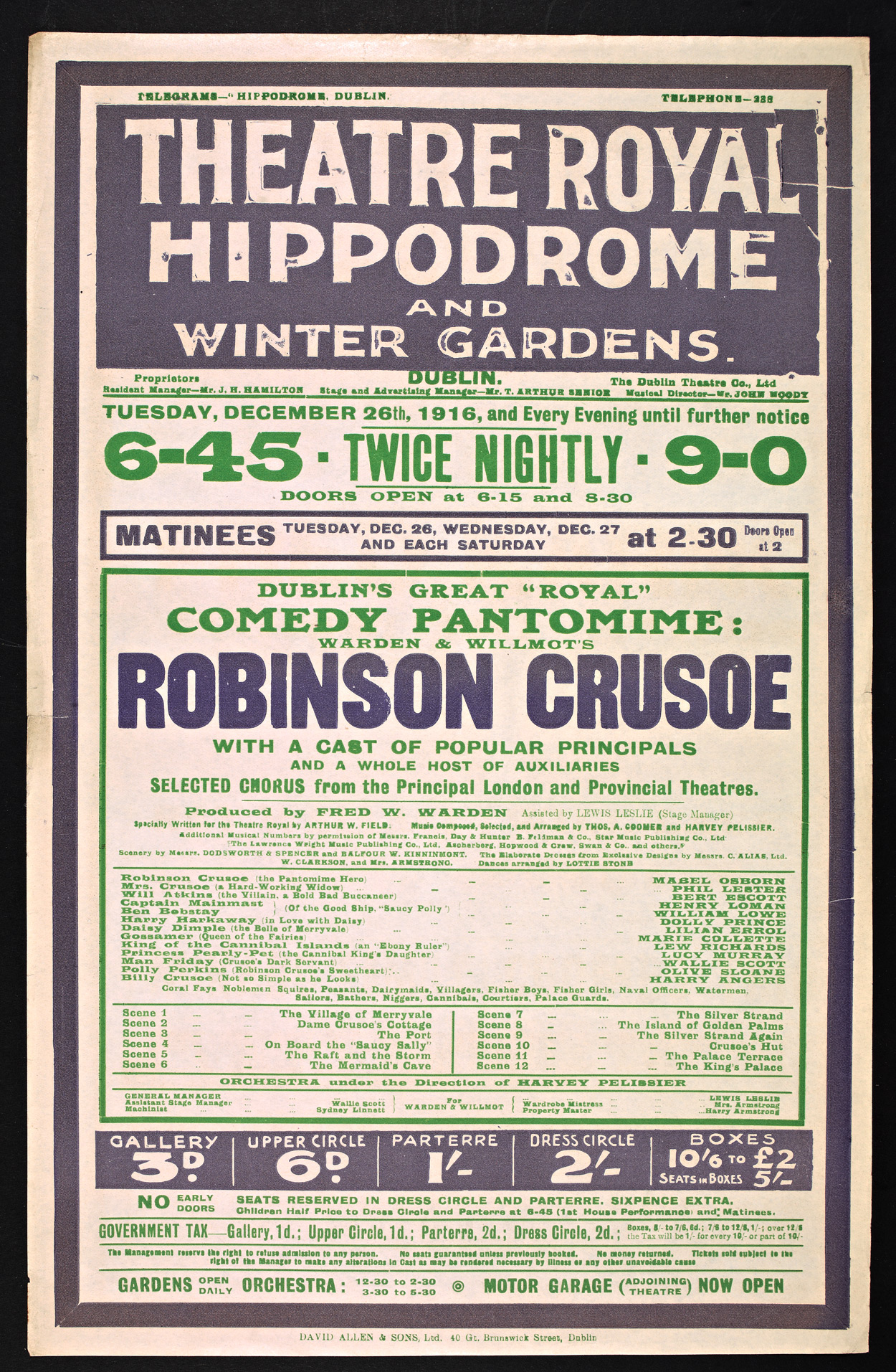
Theatre poster from 1916

== The fifth Theatre Royal (1935–1962) ==
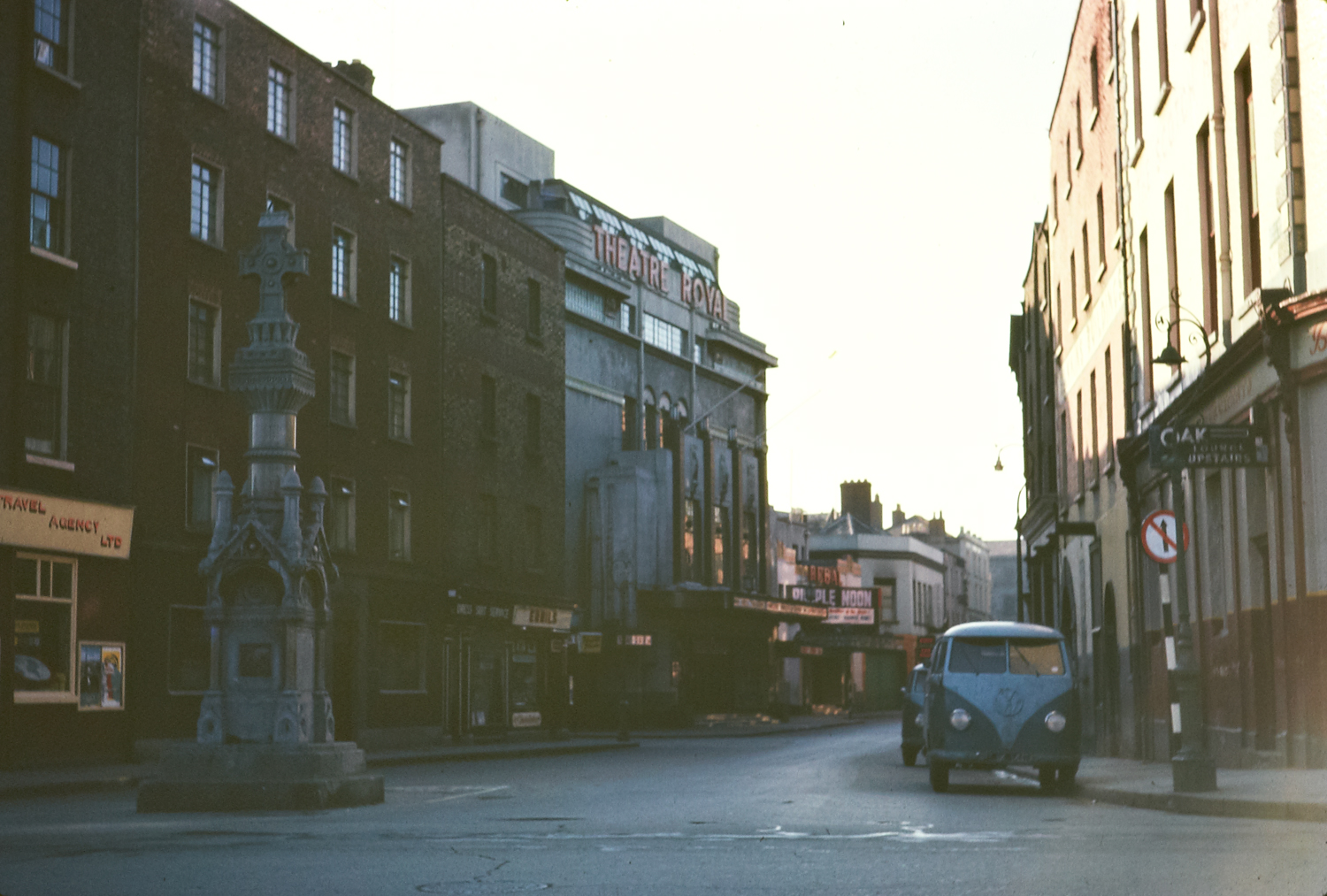
1960s image of the Theatre Royal, Hawkins Street

The fifth Theatre Royal opened on 23 September 1935 in Hawkins Street. It was a large art deco building designed for an audience of 3,700 people seated and 300 standing, and was intended for use as both theatre and cinema. It also housed the Regal Rooms Restaurant (converted into the Regal Rooms Cinema in 1938). The theatre had a resident 25-piece orchestra under the direction of Jimmy Campbell and a troupe of singer-dancers, the Royalettes. From the beginning, the sheer size of the building made it difficult for the Royal to remain economically viable. The policy adopted at first to confront this problem was to book big-name stars from overseas to fill the building. These included Gracie Fields, George Formby, Max Wall, Max Miller and Jimmy Durante. However, these shows rarely made a profit.

In 1936, the Royal was acquired by Patrick Wall and Louis Elliman, who also owned the Gaiety. With the outbreak of the Second World War, Wall and Elliman were forced to keep the two theatres going with native talent only. This led to the emergence of a raft of Irish acts which were to provide the mainstay of the Royal's output for the remainder of its existence. These included such Irish household names as Jimmy O'Dea, Harry O'Donovan, Maureen Potter, Danny Cummins, Mike Nolan, Alice Dalgarno, Noel Purcell, Micheál Mac Liammóir, Cecil Sheridan, Jack Cruise, Paddy Crosbie and Patricia Cahill. In July 1951, Judy Garland appeared for a series of sold-out performances and was received with tremendous ovations. The legendary singer sang from her dressing room window to hundreds of people who were unable to get tickets and critics dubbed her "America's Colleen". She drew the largest crowds up until that time and was only surpassed by the visits to Ireland of United States President John F. Kennedy in 1963 and Pope John Paul II in 1979. Popular Irish American entertainer Carmel Quinn also made her singing debut here during the early 1950s.

Under pressure from rising overhead costs and the increasing popularity of the cinema and the introduction of television, the fifth Theatre Royal closed its doors on 30 June 1962. However, some critics of the developers who purchased the theatre have expressed doubt that this was the reason for closing the venue. Cecil Sheridan commented that "It's not television that's done it, you know. It's a matter of how much money you can make out of a square foot of property." On the final night on 30 June 1962, the theatre was sold out with a show entitled the Royal Finale. Everything that could be taken away was sold off from the building, from the safety curtain to the ticket kiosks. The building was subsequently demolished and replaced by a twelve-storey office block, Hawkins House, which was the headquarters of Ireland's Department of Health until 2019.

In 1972, The New Metropole, opened on the corner of Hawkins Street and Townsend Street on the site of The Regal Rooms. It operated as the Screen Cinema from 1984 until 2016. The building was demolished in 2019.

== Legacy ==
Pete St. John's 1970s song about changes in Dublin, "The Rare Ould Times," mentions the demolition of the fifth Theatre Royal in 1962: "The Pillar and the Met have gone, the Royal long since pulled down..."

In 2022, during redevelopment in the area, a campaign began to rename a street in the vicinity of the demolished theatre as Theatre Royal Way.

== Bibliography ==
- (anonymous) The History of the Theatre Royal, Dublin (Dublin: E. Ponsonby, 1870)
- Ryan, Philip B.: The Lost Theatres of Dublin (Westbury, Wiltshire: The Badger Press, 1998); ISBN 0-9526076-1-1.
