= Regal Cinema, Dublin =

Regal Cinema
- Regal Rooms Cinema
- Interactive map of Regal Cinema
- Address: Hawkins Street; Dublin; Ireland
- Coordinates: 53.346046°N 6.256742°W
- Owner: Irish Cinemas Ltd.
- Capacity: 900
- Type: Cinema
- Current use: Demolished

Construction
- Opened: 16 April 1938
- Closed: 30 June 1962
- Reopened: 19 August 1955
- Architect: Michael Scott

The Regal Cinema was a film theatre that operated for almost a quarter of a century in Dublin, Ireland, until its closure in 1962.

== History ==
Also known as the Regal Rooms Cinema, it was located in Hawkins Street, adjacent to the Theatre Royal. Both venues were owned by the same company, Irish Cinemas Ltd. The cinema opened on Holy Saturday, 16 April 1938. It was designed by architect Michael Scott. The first film screened was the screwball comedy, True Confession, starring Carole Lombard and Fred MacMurray.

In May 1955, the Regal closed while renovations took place. The side balconies were removed to increase the seating capacity to 900. It reopened on 19 August with the Walt Disney movie, 20,000 Leagues Under the Sea.

== Premieres ==
The Regal had its greatest success in February 1960 as the first Dublin cinema to show George Morrison's documentary, Mise Éire. In the first week of its run, over 16,000 people viewed the film, breaking all previous box office records at the venue. In October 1961, the sequel, Saoirse?, was also given its Dublin première at the Regal.

On 26 April 1962, a film version of Synge's The Playboy of the Western World, starring Siobhán McKenna, had its world premiere at the Regal. By then, news of the cinema's imminent closure had reached the media.

== Closure ==
On 30 June 1962, the Regal Cinema closed down. The last film to be screened there was a re-issue of a British comedy, Upstairs and Downstairs. The final event at the cinema was a sale of its fixtures and fittings held on 12 July. Among the items auctioned was the big screen, which was sold for £90. The owners attributed their decision to rising costs and a shortage of good quality films. The building was subsequently demolished and replaced by a twelve-storey office block, Hawkins House, headquarters of Ireland's Department of Health.
