= Gordon Brewster =

Irish cartoonist (1889–1946)

- Born: 26 September 1889; 15 D'Olier Street, Dublin
- Died: 16 June 1946 (aged 56); Howth, Dublin
- Other name: William Gordon Brewster

William Gordon Brewster (26 September 1889 – 16 June 1946) was an Irish illustrator and editorial cartoonist.

== Life ==
Gordon Brewster was born at 15 D'Olier Street, Dublin, the son of William Theodore Brewster, secretary, and Susan McConnell. He was educated at the Dublin Metropolitan School of Art.

From 1906, Brewster was the editorial cartoonist for the Irish Independent group of newspapers. His father was a general manager at the newspaper group, and his brother was manager of the Cork office. He drew cartoons mainly on money matters for daily newspapers including the Evening Herald. Aside from Victor Brown in The Irish Press, Brewster was one of the few satirical cartoonist in Irish newspapers until the 1970s.

Brewster was one of the first artists to produce cover artwork for the Catholic Truth Society of Ireland. Three years after his death he was remembered as "the first good artist to serve the Society" after the "amateurish" contributions of earlier artists. His covers for the Society include The Saddest Death of All by Rev. J. J. Gaffney, A Dreadful Holocaust by M. J. O'Mullane and The Alcoholic Road by Henry Morris.

Brewster lived in Sutton. He died in Howth on 16 June 1946, aged 56, having collapsed in a shop called The Gem. Cause of death was cardiac failure and atheroma of the coronary artery. He is buried alongside his parents in Kilbarrack Cemetery. A plaque was erected at The Gem, commemorating Brewster.

Brewster would insist on newspapers such as the Evening Herald returning his cartoons to him. This resulted in him amassing a retaining a large collection of his published cartoons, which were later donated to the National Library of Ireland.

== See also ==
- Our Boys (magazine)
