= School Around the Corner =

Irish radio and television programme

- Genre: Entertainment
- Created by: Paddy Crosbie
- Presented by: Paddy Crosbie (1954-1973)(1962-1966); Gerry Ryan (1990-1994); Frank Mitchell (1995-2005); Ray D'Arcy (2013)
- Opening theme: "The School Around the Corner"
- Country of origin: Ireland
- Original language: English

Production
- Camera setup: Multi-camera
- Running time: 25-60 minutes

Original release
- Network: Radio Éireann (1954-1973); Telefís Éireann (1962-1966); RTÉ One (1990-1994); UTV (1995-2005); RTÉ One (2013)
- Release: 2 January 1962 – 23 December 2005

The School Around the Corner is a radio programme aired in Ireland beginning at Easter, 1954, when Michael O h-Aodha gave the "idea" his blessing, Seamus Kavanagh took over as producer of the first short series. The producers who succeeded Seamus were Joan Dalton and Padraig O'Neill. Paddy Crosbie who presented the show at this time was the originator and writer of 'School Around the Corner' and composer of the show's popular theme song of the same name.

== Format ==
The host would ask a question to a child of primary school age who would usually respond in a "cute" or humorous way.

== Radio ==
The show was first broadcast by Radio Éireann in 1954 until 1973. The series moved back to radio from television after the setting up of RTÉ in 1966, it ran for one more year. It was again revived on radio in 1973. An RTÉ Guide article outlining the programme's history was published on 1 June 1973.

== Television ==
The series moved to television with the launch of Teilfís Éirean in 1961. The programme was first broadcast by Telefís Éireann/RTÉ in 1962 and ran until 1966. The show on television was also hosted by Paddy Crosbie. The programme continued until 1966 on RTÉ Television and made a short return to radio in 1966 and 1973.

Jim (James) Plunkett guided the School on to television, it was the 1st show to be pre-recorded for the new television station in 1961 and top of the TAM ratings up to when it was discontinued over five years later. The first episode was broadcast on 2 January 1962. On television the programme had many FIRSTS - first home feature in the top ten, first in first place and first to travel around the country.[9]

=== Revivals ===
In the 1990s the series began to be produced by Tyrone Productions for RTÉ and was commissioned by RTÉ until 1994. The series was hosted by Gerry Ryan from 1990 to 1994.

Tyrone Productions offered the series to UTV in Northern Ireland where it ran for a decade from 1995 to 2005. On UTV the series was hosted by Frank Mitchell.

In 2013 RTÉ revived the series again with a Christmas special and then a full series the following year hosted by Ray D'Arcy.

From Christmas 2021 all RTÉ series of it are on RTÉ Player to mark 60 Years Of Television.
