= Jimmy Boy =

1935 film directed by John Baxter

- Jimmy O'Dea (left) in the film
- Directed by: John Baxter
- Written by: Harry O'Donovan; Con West
- Produced by: John Barter
- Starring: Jimmy O'Dea; Guy Middleton; Enid Stamp-Taylor
- Cinematography: George Stretton
- Music by: Kennedy Russell
- Production companies: Baxter & Barter Films
- Distributed by: Universal Pictures
- Release date: August 1935
- Running time: 71 minutes
- Country: United Kingdom
- Language: English

Jimmy Boy is a 1935 British comedy film directed by John Baxter and starring Jimmy O'Dea, Guy Middleton and Enid Stamp-Taylor. It was written by Harry O'Donovan and Con West, and made at Cricklewood Studios.

== Plot ==
Odd-jobbing Irishman Jimmy moves to London to seek his fortune. He gets a job as an extra at a film studio, which nearly ends in disaster when he is outfitted in a Ruritanian costume designed for a man twice his size. Finding work as a lift operator at a hotel he discovers that the building is being used by foreign agents plotting an evil scheme that threatens the safety of the city. With the help of his fellow hotel staff, he manages to thwart their plans and save the day.

== Cast ==
- Jimmy O'Dea as Jimmy
- Guy Middleton as The Count
- Vera Sherborne as Nora
- Enid Stamp-Taylor as The Star
- Elizabeth Jenns as The Princess
- Harold Williams as The Prince
- Edgar Driver as The Liftman
- Harry O'Donovan as O'Brien
- Peggy Novak as The Maid
- Kathleen Drago
- Johnnie Schofield
- Elizabeth Vaughan
- J.H. Edwin
- Stanley Kirby
- Syd Crossley
- Noel Purcell
- The Sherman Fisher Girls as themselves
- The Mackay Twins
- Reginald Forsyth as himself
- Victor Rietti

== Reception ==
Kine Weekly wrote: "So disjointed and slipshod is the development of this picture that its making appears to have been impromptu. It starts off in a sentimental romantic vein, then drifts into comedy burlesque; following this it takes an excursion into the realms of 'penny blood' fiction, and ends up in cabaret. The final sequences are the brightest; they are so engineered as to introduce Enid Stamp-Taylor, who renders a tuneful song attractively; the Mackay Twins, clever eccentric dancers, and Reginald Forsyth and his Band, but there is grave doubt as to whether the average audience will remain long enough to appreciate them."

The Daily Film Renter wrote: "Development frequently obscure, while artificial characterisation, trite dialogue and melodramatic acting are added disadvantages. Principal entertainment values are provided by cabaret scene at climax, where Enid Stamp-Taylor puts over snappy number; chorine high-stepping, and blackface song by Jimmy O'Dea. Picturesque Bantry Bay exteriors, film studio and hotel form major locales. Possible second feature offering for uncritical patrons."

Picturegoer wrote: "Heavy Irish sentimentality is the keynote of this disjointed and haphazard collection of varied interests comprising crime, comedy, variety, romance and vaudeville.The artistes are handicapped by the extreme paucity of the material. Enid Stamp-Taylor provides the brightest moments in a dull show with an attractively rendered and tuneful song."

Picture Show wrote: "Jimmy O'Dea as Jimmy gives an amusing performance; he has a most attractive Irish brogue. Enid Stamp-Taylor sings attractively."
