= Paddy Crosbie =

Irish broadcaster (1913–1982)

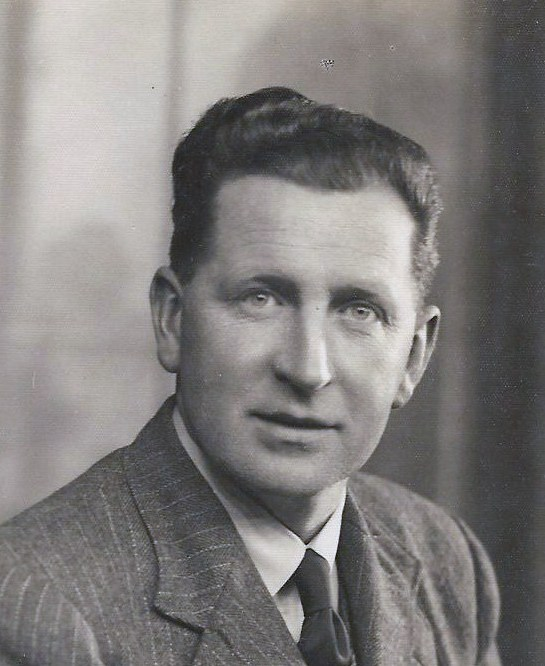
- Crosbie, c. 1958
- Born: Patrick Crosbie; 1 October 1913; Dublin, Ireland
- Died: 2 September 1982 (aged 68); Clondalkin, Ireland
- Education: St Patrick's Training College; University College Dublin
- Occupation: Television presenter
- Years active: 1953–1982
- Known for: School Around the Corner; Back To School
- Parents: Martin Crosbie; Lily Corcoran
- Relatives: Martin Crosbie (brother)

Paddy Crosbie (1 October 1913 – 2 September 1982) was the Irish creator of the radio and television programmes The School Around The Corner and Back To School.

== Youth ==
Crosbie was born in Dublin, Ireland on 1 October 1913 at 12A Bridewell Lane, which was one of the houses converted from the old Smithfield Bridewell shortly before the First World War. His parents were Martin Crosbie and Lily Corcoran.

He attended infant school in Stanhope Street and on 23 August 1920 he entered St. Paul's Christian Brothers' School, North Brunswick Street, known to Dubliners as "Brunner". He would eventually spend 57 years in this school as pupil and teacher. Crosbie subsequently studied at St. Patrick's Training College, Drumcondra and University College Dublin.

Crosbie was only four weeks in Brunner when the sound of shots put a stop to lessons for a short time. It was the day when a youth name Kevin Barry had been captured by the British after an ambush. Two soldiers were killed. Five weeks later on 1 November, he stood outside Mountjoy Jail with his mother and his older brother Martin Crosbie, awaiting the notice of his execution.

He was a keen sportsman in his youth, and won a special medal when defeating Austin Clarke, the all-Ireland singles handball champion. He played steady hurling for the Dublin club Eoghan ruadh, and created a Dublin Tennis League record by never losing a singles set between 1938 and 1950.

== Professional life ==
Crosbie composed songs (most remembered would be the theme song for "School Around The Corner), comic rhyme and scripts for stage and television. He wrote two books Tales from the School Around the Corner in 1979 and Your Dinner's Poured Out in 1981.

His interest in the entertainment world began in the early 1940s when he wrote scripts for the amateur shows put on by a Dublin tennis club. It was Mike Nolan the well known comedian, of the forties and fifties, who introduced him to the powers-that-were and soon he was writing scripts for stars like Noel Purcell and the Happy Gang in Dublin's Capitol Theatre and the Theatre Royal .

Crosbie needed more active participation and so in 1951 his famous school-boy act was born. He first took to the stage, in short trousers and skull-cap in Dublin's St. Francis Xavier Hall which was also the place which first rang to his signature tune, "The School Around The Corner".

In 1953 he stepped into a major place in Radio Éireann, compère of his own show, a new show conceived and conducted by himself. Starting with his own school the C.B.S. in North Brunswick Street, he launched The School Around The Corner. The programme began at Easter 1954, when producer Micheál Ó hAodha gave the initial go-ahead. Seamus Kavanagh subsequently took over as producer of the first short series, and he was succeeded by Joan Dalton and Padraig O'Neill.

Jim (James) Plunkett guided the School on to television, it was the first show to be pre-recorded for the new television station in 1961 and top of the TAM ratings up to when it was discontinued over five years later. The first episode was broadcast on 2 January 1962. On television the programme had many FIRSTS – first home feature in the top ten, first in first place and first to travel around the country. The programme continued until 1966 on RTÉ Television before returning to RTÉ Radio for another year. It was again revived on radio in 1973. He won a Jacob's Award in 1964 "for his many amusing and entertaining contributions to Telefís Éireann".

== Awards ==
- Jacob's Award in 1964.
- Benemerenti medal, honoured by Pope John Paul II with the Papal decoration in 1979.

== Death ==
He died suddenly at his home in Clondalkin on 2 September 1982 from a heart attack. He was laid to rest in the presence of some of the most important people in the political, theatrical and educational life of the country. Friends attending the service included Maureen Potter, James Plunkett, Brendan Grace, Maurice O'Doherty, president, Irish Actors' Equity; Seán Ó Síocháin, Chris Casey and Éamonn MacThomáis. The Taoiseach was represented by his aide de camp, Commdt. Christopher Leaney. Mr. Brian Fleming, T.D., represented Fine Gael leader, Dr. Garret FitzGerald . During the Requiem Mass, the organist played "Knockmaroon" a song that Paddy had written for his wife, Peg. "The School Around The Corner" was played on the organ as his remains were carried from the Church of the Immaculate Conception, Clondalkin. A garda escort led the funeral procession to Esker cemetery in Lucan. Included in the inscription of his headstone is "The school around the corner is just the same"
