= Our Boys (magazine) =

- Type: Monthly boys' magazine
- Format: Magazine
- Owner: Irish Christian Brothers
- Founded: September 1914
- Ceased publication: 1990
- Country: Ireland

Our Boys was a boys' magazine published monthly by the Irish Christian Brothers in Ireland.

The various Education Acts of the late 19th and early 20th century had created a market in Britain for magazines and periodicals which were also popular in Ireland. At a time when there was a growing sense of national self-identity in Ireland, the purpose of the Our Boys magazine was to compete with British boys' magazines, which were in the main pro-British Empire and pro-Church of England. It specialised in adventure stories, school stories and historical stories featuring Irish protagonists, competitions and puzzles, as well as lightweight family content. It was sold through the Christian Brothers' schools, as well as being available in newsagents throughout the country.

A highlight of the magazine from 1924 on was the series of "Kitty the Hare" stories by Victor O'D. Power. School articles were contributed by Paddy Crosbie. Gerrit Van Gelderen provided articles on wildlife. William Hickey wrote the "Murphy" series of school stories. Another contributor was novelist Una Troy.

Illustrators whose work was published in Our Boys included W. C. Mills, Gordon Brewster, George Altendorf, Gerrit van Gelderen, George Monks and M. J. O'Mullane.

The magazine had a large circulation for Ireland, and advertising kept the magazine ticking over financially. A list of advertisers from the Christmas 1972 edition includes Raleigh Bicycles, Allied Irish Banks, Hector Value (toys), Department of Health, CBS Records, Walton's (musical instruments), Fred Hanna (books), Corgi Toys, Aer Lingus and Odeon Cinemas.

The influence of Our Boys extended beyond Ireland as it was made available to the Irish communities of England, Australia, the US, and even India, where it was distributed through the Christian Brothers' schools.
