= Patricia Cahill (singer) =

Irish singer (1942–2022)

- Born: 3 March 1942; Dublin, Ireland
- Died: 11 May 2022 (aged 80); Marbella, Spain
- Occupation: Singer
- Spouse: Ciaran O'Carroll

Patricia Cahill (3 March 1942 – 11 May 2022) was an Irish singer. Her first appearance in public was in Dublin's Theatre Royal at the age of seventeen.

== Career ==
Cahill's first commercial recording, Ireland's Patricia Cahill sings for you, was recorded in Dublin and was later reissued in the United States under the title Danny Boy. In the late 1960s and early 1970s she appeared often on Irish television, many times with the stage star Maureen Potter. She took part in the 1965 Irish National Final for the Eurovision Song Contest with the song I Stand Still coming second.

She appeared on the Val Doonican Show on 18 November 1970, and also appeared regularly on BBC Television's Songs of Praise, Hosted by Robert Dougal. Cahill also appeared on RTÉ TV's series A Handful of Songs, broadcast across the-then ITV network, during the early 1970s.

== Personal life ==
Cahill was married to Ciaran O'Carroll until his death in 2013. She latterly lived in Marbella, Spain, where she died on 11 May 2022, at the age of 80.
