= Penny Paradise =

1938 film by Carol Reed

- 1938 Ealing campaign book cover
- Directed by: Carol Reed
- Written by: Thomas Browne; Walter Meade; Thomas Thompson; Basil Dean
- Produced by: Basil Dean
- Starring: Edmund Gwenn; Betty Driver; Jimmy O'Dea
- Cinematography: Ronald Neame; Gordon Dines
- Edited by: Ernest Aldridge
- Music by: Harry O'Donovan
- Production company: Associated Talking Pictures
- Distributed by: Associated British
- Release date: 24 September 1938
- Running time: 72 minutes
- Country: United Kingdom
- Language: English

Penny Paradise is a 1938 British comedy film directed by Carol Reed and starring Edmund Gwenn, Betty Driver and Jimmy O'Dea.

== Plot ==
The film is set in Liverpool, where tugboat captain Joe Higgins, believing he has won £20,000 on the football pools, resigns from his job and throws a party in a local public house where family and friends – some of whom have an eye on a share of the winnings – gather to celebrate his good luck. Higgins pays court to the widow Clegg who he has been wooing, while his daughter Betty is targeted by a chancer who wants her money. The party grinds to a halt with the arrival of the hapless Pat, Higgins' Irish first mate on the tugboat, who is forced to admit that he forgot to post the winning pools coupon. There now seems no reason for celebration, but Higgins is mollified when his former employer offers him the captaincy of the best tugboat on the River Mersey, a position to which he had long aspired.

== Cast ==
- Edmund Gwenn as Joe Higgins
- Betty Driver as Betty Higgins
- Jimmy O'Dea as Pat
- Ethel Coleridge as Aunt Agnes
- Maire O'Neill as Widow Clegg
- Syd Crossley as Uncle Lancelot
- James Harcourt as Amos Cook
- Jack Livesey as Bert
- Frederick Burtwell as policeman

== Production ==
The film was made at Associated Talking Pictures Studios in Ealing. It was an early directorial assignment for Reed, and along with many other British productions of the era, such as the same year's Reed-directed Bank Holiday (1938), has been described as "belonging to a wider studio tradition of modest representation of ordinary British life."

== Music ==
The action of the film is interspersed with several musical numbers performed by Driver and one by O'Dea. Whilst O'Dea's song is clearly provided for comic effect, those sung by Driver are presented straight.

== Critical reception ==
Monthly Film Bulletin said "Good character drawing, unaffected and telling dialogue, and many clever directorial touches help to make up the total excellent effect. ... The acting is good. Edmund Gwenn is quite at home in the part of Joe, and puts over a thoroughly sound and sympathetic performance. Jimmy O'Dea gives a neat and promising little character study as Pat. Betty Driver when she ceases trying to be Gracie Fields will probably act with force and vitality as herself. The supporting cast is thoroughly competent. The settings on river, quayside, and in local pub and small home, are varied, and appropriate."

Kine Weekly said "This topical story, with its original tale of wholesale reaction to unexpected riches, presents both an amusing and human experiment in mass psychology. It is not in the least highbrow, neither are its conclusions forced. Spontaneity is, in fact, its strong suit. It scores all along the line with its faithful North Country character drawing, excellent dialogue and effectively promoted atmosphere. Carol Reed's direction definitely is shrewd."

In British Sound Films: The Studio Years 1928–1959 David Quinlan rated the film as "good", writing: "Hackneyed story gets new lease of life from character acting, convincing settings."

Leslie Halliwell said: "An old, old story, with modest effectiveness."

The Radio Times Guide to Films gave the film 2/5 stars, writing: "A simple and oft-told tale makes for a short and straightforward British film, given an authentic background by director Carol Reed, and beautifully played by Welsh character actor Edmund Gwenn, soon to find Hollywood stardom."
