= Riff Raff Theatre Company =

Irish theatre company

Riff Raff Theatre is a theatre company based in Wexford, Ireland. The company was founded in 1981 by four theatre practitioners: Michael Way, Irene Wright, Leo Meehan and Gerard Hanton and remains Wexford's first full-time theatre company. Classified as "independent professional fringe theatre", it specialises in premiering new works and new interpretations of contemporary classics.

== Productions ==
The company's back catalogue includes productions of August Strindberg's Miss Julie, The Factory Girls by Frank McGuinness, Ruffian on the Stair by Joe Orton, The Fire Raisers by Max Frisch, The Glass Menagerie by Tennessee Williams, Fool For Love and States of Shock both by Sam Shepard and the first European production of Orange Flower Water by Craig Wright.

== Cast Members ==
Actors who have come through the ranks of the company include Irene Wright, Gary Lydon, Steve Gunn, Laura Way (daughter of the co-founders), Amy Joyce Hastings
