= Blarney (1938 film) =

1938 British film by Harry O'Donovan

- Opening titles
- Directed by: Harry O'Donovan
- Produced by: Jimmy O'Dea
- Starring: Jimmy O'Dea; Myrette Morven; Julie Suedo
- Cinematography: L.S. Parker
- Edited by: Tilly Day
- Music by: John Reynders
- Production company: O'D Productions
- Release date: 1938
- Running time: 69 minutes
- Country: United Kingdom
- Language: English

Blarney (also known as Ireland's Border Line) is a 1938 British comedy film directed by Harry O'Donovan and starring Jimmy O'Dea, Myrette Morven and Julie Suedo. It was produced as a quota quickie.

== Plot ==
Billy Brannigan, a travelling salesman for Magic Cough Mixture, meets Albert and Sadie Tyler, a pair of crooks, who have just robbed amansion of valuable jewels. Billy accidentally walks off with their bag containing the loot, instead of his own. When the crooks realise, they set out to recover the haul, while Billy, unaware of their identity or his own mistake, plots to catch the thieves himself to claim the reward. Meanwhile, Sergeant MacAleer of the Northern Irish Police and Sergeant Hogan of the Southern Irish force are fierce rivals for the hand of Maura, an innkeeper’s daughter. When Maura's father gives Billy a job at the inn, the two policemen also join the hunt for the thieves, hoping the arrest will secure them a promotion, and Maura's admiration. Billy falls for Annie, a barmaid. With her assistance, he tracks down the crooks and recovers his bag.It is decided to give the credit for the arrest to Sergeant MacAleer, Maura's preferred suitor, which happily strengthens the bond between North and South.

== Cast ==
- Jimmy O'Dea as Billy Branigan
- Myrette Morven as Annie
- Julie Suedo as Sadie Tyler
- Ronald Malcolmson as Sergeant MacAleer
- Hazel Hughes as Maura
- Kenneth Warrington as Albert Tyler
- Noel Purcell as Sergeant Hogan
- J.H. Edwin as Michael O'Connor
- Tom Dunne as Bullock Byrne
- Jimmy Wildman as Scutty Whelan

== Reception ==
The Monthly Film Bulletin wrote: "The scenery, country dancing, and Border explanations would have been better left to a purely documentary film. Julie Suedo and Ken Warrington make excellent crooks but have little to do."

Kine Weekly wrote: "Much of the directorial and technical work is marked by lack of experience, but the star reveals promise and his native wit does much to cloak the shortcomings. Homely in its sentiment and humour, the film should register with the not too sophisticated. ... The treatment is a little ragged – the suggestion of enmity between Northern and Southern Ireland is, for instance, superfluous – but the basic theme is good and this, thanks to the artless resource of the star, contains the making of a reasonable number of laughs."

The Daily Film Renter wrote: "Naive in design, the narrative is not completely convincing, while direction is lacking in polish, and the production lacks dramatic tension, but there are some attractive Irish exteriors that bring the charm of Erin to the screen, while jimmy O'Dea turns in a likeable showing as the amateur detective, his work having a sincerity that is of an infectious variety."

Boxoffice wrote: "The story is a rambling affair, something of a comedy of errors. There's an undeniable homey. Irish flavor about the characters and the backgrounds; albeit a wanting supporting cast. Jimmy O'Dea, in the lead role, is an ingratiating comedian."

Variety wrote: "Pert little Irish comedy ... Cheaply made, with few interiors and those mostly devoid of any expensive productional touches, the film nevertheless is entertaining, despite its innocuous story. ... Film drags in spots but, by and large, the direction keeping things moving at a neat pace throughout."
