= Capitol Theatre, Dublin =

Irish venue

Coordinates: 53.34889°N 6.26094°W

The Capitol Theatre was located in Prince's Street, just off O'Connell Street, Dublin, and began life on 10 August 1920 as the La Scala Theatre and Opera House. Designed by architect T. F. McNamara it had two balconies in the 1,900-seat auditorium with 32 private boxes. On St. Patrick's Day 1923 Irish-American Mike McTigue won the World Light-Heavyweight Championship from French-Sengalese champion Battling Siki at the La Scala Opera House.

Despite its name, the La Scala was a cinema. Paramount Pictures took over the lease on the building and renamed it the Capitol in 1927. Under new management, the Capitol ran a live show every week to accompany the current film. Well-known Irish acts to appear in these shows included Peggy Dell, Martin Crosbie, brother of Paddy Crosbie, creator of the School Around the Corner, and Sean Mooney. The last stage show was on 29 October 1953. The Capitol continued as a cinema until 1972. It was demolished along with the adjacent Metropole Cinema and a branch of the department store chain British Home Stores was built on the site. This in turn closed and was replaced by a branch of the Irish Penneys chain.
