= Leinster Hall =

Concert hall in Dublin

The Leinster Hall was a music or concert hall in Dublin, Ireland, built in Hawkins Street on the site of the third Theatre Royal, after the Royal had been destroyed by fire in 1880. The Leinster Hall opened in November 1886. One of the most notable performers to appear there was Dame Nellie Melba, who gave two concerts in the hall in 1893. The hall closed in 1895, and was redesigned and reopened as the fourth Theatre Royal in 1897.
