= Jimmy O'Dea =

Irish actor and comedian (1899–1965)

Publicity still

James Augustine O'Dea (26 April 1899 – 7 January 1965) was an Irish actor and comedian.

== Life ==
Jimmy O'Dea was born at 11 Lower Bridge Street, Dublin, to James O'Dea, an ironmonger, and Martha O'Gorman, who kept a small toy shop. He was one of 11 children. His father had a shop in Capel Street. He was educated at the Irish Christian Brothers O'Connell School in North Richmond Street, Dublin, where a classmate was future Taoiseach Seán Lemass, by the Holy Ghost Fathers at Blackrock College, and by the Jesuits at Belvedere College. From a young age he was interested in taking to the stage; he co-founded an amateur acting group, the Kilronan Players, in 1917. But his father would not hear of it. O'Dea was apprenticed to an optician in Edinburgh, Scotland, where he qualified as an optician.

He returned to Dublin where, aged 21, he set up his own business which he was, eventually, to give to his sister, Rita. In his spare time, he took part in amateur productions of Ibsen and Chekhov. From 1920 he was in the Irish theatre in Hardwicke Street working with actor-producer John McDonagh. In 1922 he made a series of comedy films for Norman Whitten. After working in plays by Shaw for a few years he rejoined McDonagh in revues, the first of which, Dublin To-Night, was produced at the Queen's Theatre in 1924. In 1927 he took to the stage full-time. In 1928, this company's first production Here We Are won international acclaim, and in December of the same year it produced its first Christmas Pantomime, Sinbad the Sailor.

O'Dea formed a partnership with Harry O'Donovan (died 3 November 1973) whom he first met in a production of You Never Can Tell in 1924. Their first show was Look Who's Here at Queen's. For more than two decades beginning in 1929 the duo produced two shows a year in Dublin, first in the Olympia Theatre, then in the Gaiety. They created O'Dea's most famous character, "Mrs. Biddy Mulligan". The role drew on Jimmy's previous manifestations as "Dames" in Variety performances and pantomimes. Biddy Mulligan was the representation (caricature, parody and stereotype) of a Dublin street-seller, with all the working-class repartee, wisdom and failings implicit. He made a number of recordings of sketches starring Mrs. Mulligan. Biddy Mulligan is referenced in many Dublin music hall songs such as "Biddy Mulligan the Pride of the Coombe", "Daffy the Belle of the Coombe" and "The Charladies' Ball". Harry O'Donovan also wrote and directed the comedy film Blarney (1938) with O'Dea as star.

O'Dea made some film appearances, such as Darby O'Gill and the Little People (1959) in which he played the leprechaun king Brian, and Johnny Nobody (1961) as a postman. He also had a successful career in pantomime and toured Ireland and England many times, and is much associated with actress Maureen Potter (1925–2004), with whom he often partnered.

O'Dea was also a prolific songwriter. Many of his songs are still well known to this day, some of them having been sung and recorded by Dublin singer Frank Harte.

== Personal life ==
O'Dea married Ursula Doyle. Maureen Potter was a bridesmaid. Seán Lemass, was best man; while Taoiseach, Lemass also gave the valedictory oration at O'Dea's funeral in 1965.

== Death ==
Jimmy O'Dea died at Dr Steevens' Hospital, Dublin, aged 65, on 7 January 1965.

== Selected filmography ==
- Jimmy Boy (1935)
- Penny Paradise (1938)
- Blarney (1938)
- Cheer Boys Cheer (1939)
- Let's Be Famous (1939)
- The Rising of the Moon (1957)
- Darby O'Gill and the Little People (1959)

== Recordings ==
With Harry O'Donovan:

- "Mrs. Mulligan nearly wins the Sweep" E.3694 Parlophone
- "Mrs. Mulligan in London" E.3895 Parlophone
- "Mrs. Mulligan at the telephone" E.3663 Parlophone
- "Mrs. Mulligan at the talkies" E.3764 Parlophone
- "Mrs. Mulligan at the racecourse" E.3763 Parlophone
- "Mrs. Mulligan in the tram" E.3764 Parlophone
- "The Irish Schoolmaster" E.3634 Parlophone
- "Sixpence each way" E.3634 Parlophone
- "Biddy Mulligan" E 3817 Parlophone
- "Mrs. Mulligan, Smuggler"
- "The Charladies' Ball"
