= Everyman Theatre, Cork =

Theatre in Cork, Ireland

The Everyman
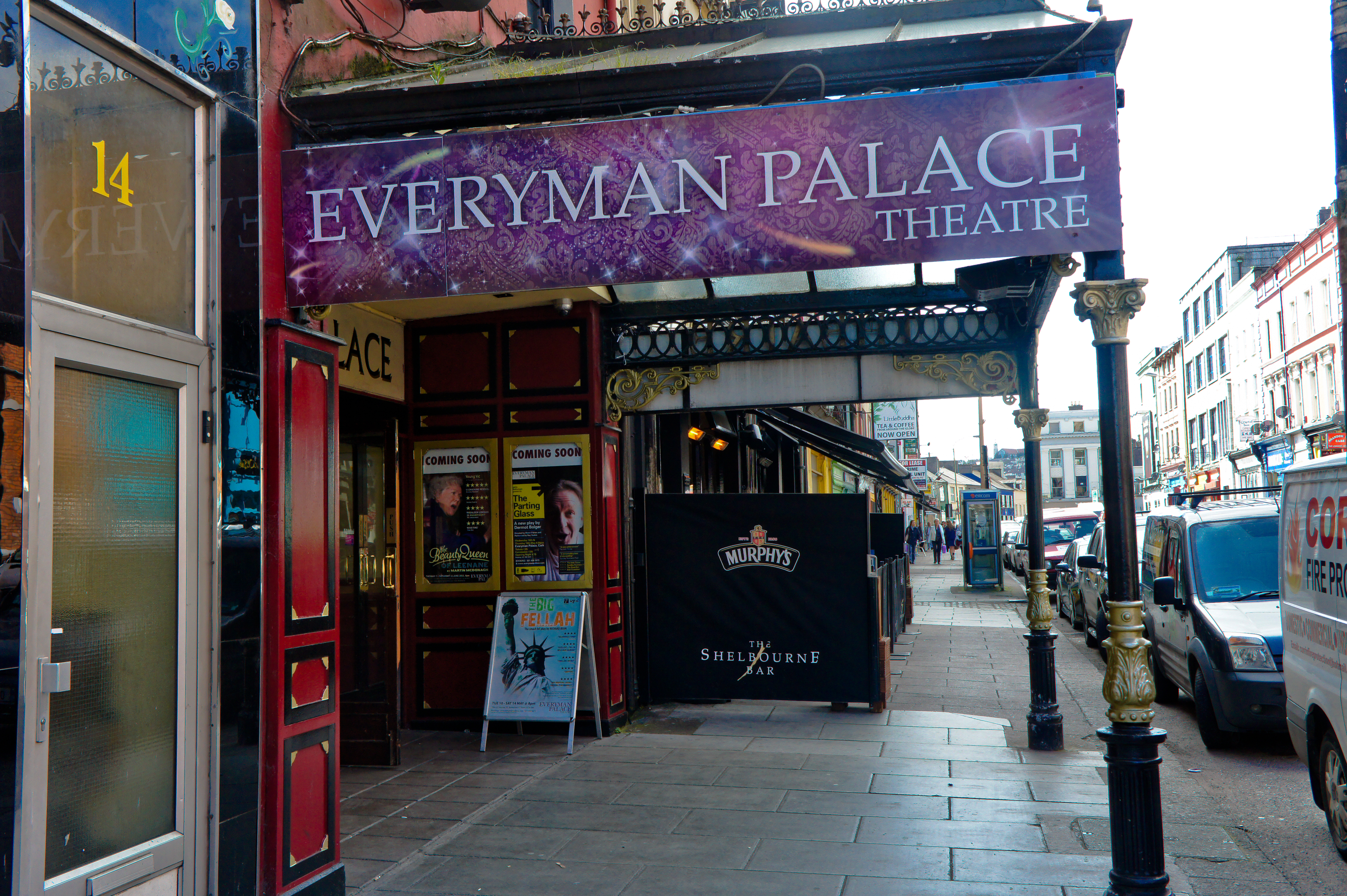
- Awning of The Everyman on MacCurtain Street

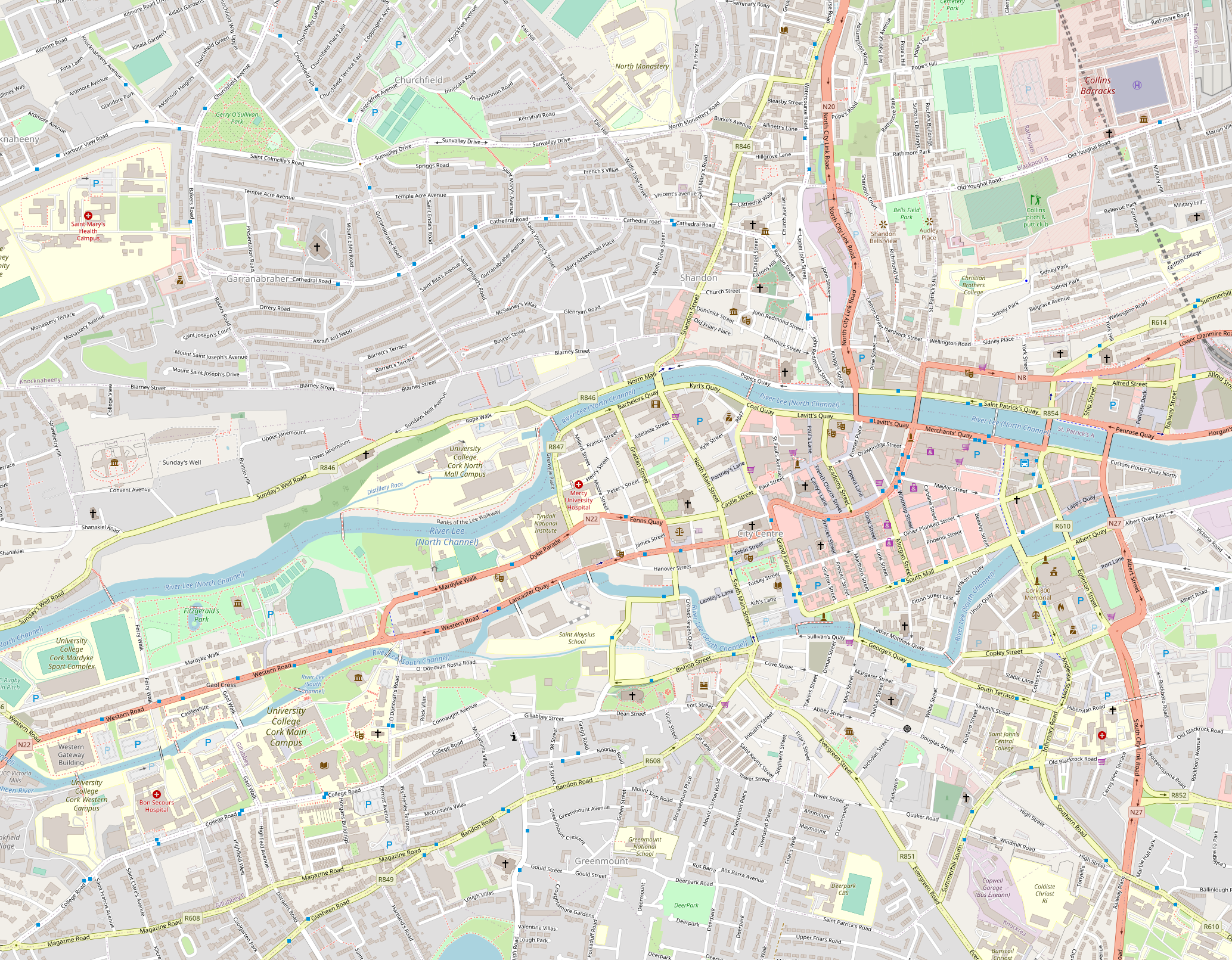
- Location within Cork Central
- Former names: Cork Palace of Varieties, Palace Cinema, Everyman Palace Theatre, Everyman Theatre
- Address: MacCurtain Street; Cork; Ireland
- Coordinates: 51.9014°N 8.4682°W
- Capacity: 650 seats
- Designation: Protected structure

Construction
- Opened: 1897
- Architect: H. Brunton

Website
- EverymanCork.com

The Everyman, also referred to as the Everyman Theatre and historically known as the Everyman Palace, is a 650-seat Victorian theatre on MacCurtain Street in Cork, Ireland. It opened in 1897, and is the oldest purpose-built theatre building in Cork. The theatre is housed in a protected Victorian building with a large stage and auditorium, a proscenium arch, four elaborately decorated boxes, a studio space and a bar.

== History ==
On Easter Monday, 19 April 1897, Dan Lowrey opened the Cork Palace of Varieties, a sister theatre to Dublin's Empire Palace (later the Olympia). Variety shows dominated its early years, followed by pantomimes, operas and dramas, with weekly visits from touring companies. Artists such as Charlie Chaplin, Stan Laurel, Oliver Hardy and George Formby performed at the venue. Ticket prices ranged from £1 for box seats to 6d for the gallery. However, the disruptions of the First World War, the Spanish Flu and the Irish Civil War led to a decline in touring productions, impacting the theatre's viability.

In the 1930s, the venue was converted into the Palace Cinema, becoming a key part of Cork's film scene for nearly five decades. Branded as “The House with the Perfect Sound”, it operated until 4 June 1988, when it closed with a screening of Trains, Planes and Automobiles. In 1990, the Everyman Theatre Company restored the historic building to its theatrical roots, renaming it the Everyman Palace Theatre. Its inaugural production in the revitalised space was Eamon Morrissey's the Brother, based on the writings of Myles na gCopaleen.

From 1990 onwards, the theatre thrived with backing from the Arts Council, Cork Corporation and volunteers.

In 2012, the venue rebranded as simply The Everyman and launched a new phase focused on opera and original productions, beginning with an Irish Times award-winning staging of Pagliacci. The theatre sharpened its focus on serving Cork's artists and audiences while gaining national recognition. In 2018, The Everyman co-produced several major works including The Nightingale and the Rose by John O’Brien and Oscar Wilde, and Asking For It by Louise O'Neill, which won the Irish Times Theatre Awards Audience Choice Prize. In 2019, Evening Train, a new musical, premiered to critical acclaim, and Asking For It returned before touring to Dublin and Birmingham.

== Function ==
The Everyman's programme is a mix of plays, operas, musicals and concerts, but it specialises in drama and usually stages three in-house productions per year. In the summer months, it hosts productions by Irish playwrights. Other recurring events include the Guinness Jazz Festival in October (for which the theatre is a primary venue), and the Christmas pantomime. A unique feature of the theatre is that its front of house ushering staff is composed entirely of volunteers.
