= Harry O'Donovan =

Irish comedy scriptwriter, stage manager and actor (c1896–1973)

Harry O'Donovan (c. 1896 – 3 November 1973) was an Irish comedy scriptwriter, stage manager and actor.

== Life ==
He was born in Dublin, Ireland and was apprenticed to a painter. In his spare time, he took part in amateur dramatics, finally joining a troupe of actors and touring Ireland for several years. In 1924 he got to know Jimmy O'Dea in a production of You Never Can Tell at the Abbey Theatre.

In 1927 he formed a partnership with Jimmy O'Dea. Their first show was Look Who's Here in the Queens Theatre. Their first pantomime was Sinbad in 1929 in the Olympia Theatre. Together they created O'Dea's most famous character, Biddy Mulligan.

For thirty years from 1929 they produced two shows a year in Dublin, first in the Olympia, later in the Gaiety.

He wrote many scripts for Radio Éireann. He also acted as business manager and stage manager for O'Dea and the rest of the cast, and acted in bit parts in plays, sketches and pantomimes.

== Legacy ==
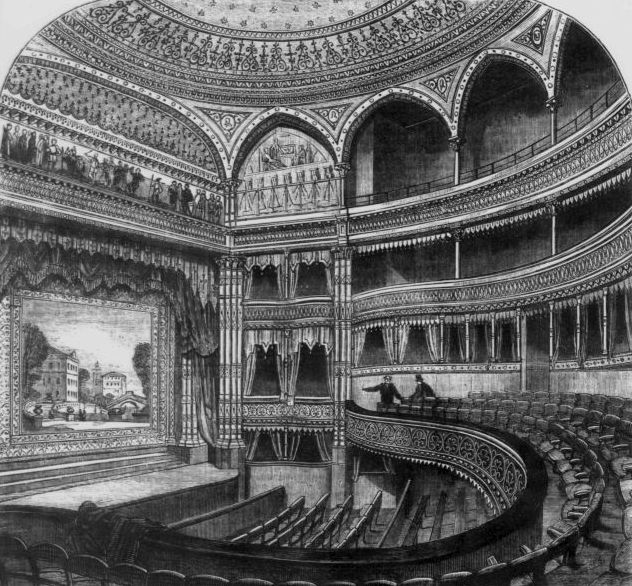
Interior of the Gaiety Theatre

O'Donovan was well known for his comedic sketches and plays but he was especially recognised for his creation of the iconic character Mrs. Biddy Mulligan that was played by his longtime partner, and co-founder of OD Productions, Jimmy O'Dea in many theatre performances and recorded sketches. It is described as O'Dea's most famous role as they recorded and released many famous gramophone records of Biddy Mulligan. These recordings included comedic sketches such as Biddy Mulligan on the Tram, Biddy Mulligan in Court, Mrs. Mulligan Nearly Wins the Sweep, Biddy Mulligan Casts Her Vote and Biddy Mulligan at the Racecourse. This character is also referenced in songs that were written by O'Donovan like Daffodil Mulligan and The Charladies' Ball but most noticeably in the song Biddy Mulligan the pride of the Coombe that was written by songwriter Seamus Kavanagh who collaborated with O'Donovan to write it.

Their success has been attributed to how they complimented each other and neither was successful without the other, resulting in a partnership that lasted for 30 years. O'Donovan's writing needed the comedic improvisations of O'Dea to bring his scripts to life and because of this duo they produced some of the most popular shows on the Dublin stage in the 1930s and 1940s.

O'Donovan played a key role in the Irish dramatic movement as he introduced Irish music hall traditions into Irish theatres, similar to the English music hall comedians who visited Ireland in the 1930s, and this new style replaced the traditional serious Irish dramas present in theatres during that time. He is one of the names that made modern Irish drama what it is today. He outlined more of an Irish Identity within his scriptwriting, including Irish life, speech and place names making his scripts more relatable to the Irish people as there was a local association with them through his Irish references and humour which made his plays more successful within the nation.

== Songs ==
- The Vamp of Inchicore
- Rathgar
- The Charladies' Ball
- Men
- Daffodil Mulligan

== Films ==
- Jimmy Boy (1935), co-writer
- Blarney (1938), director
- Penny Paradise (1938), music and lyrics
