= Noel Purcell (actor) =

Irish actor (1900–1985)

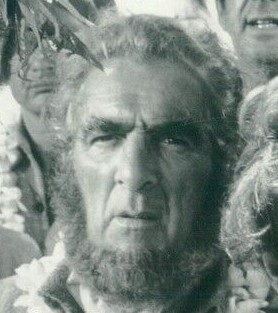
- Purcell in Mutiny on the Bounty (1962)
- Born: Patrick Joseph Noel Purcell; 23 December 1900; Dublin, County Dublin, Ireland
- Died: 3 March 1985 (aged 84); Dublin, County Dublin, Ireland
- Resting place: Deansgrange Cemetery, Blackrock, Dublin
- Occupations: Film, television, and stage actor
- Years active: 1926–1984
- Spouse: Eileen Marmion (1941–1985) (his death)
- Children: Four sons

Patrick Joseph Noel Purcell (23 December 1900 – 3 March 1985) was an Irish actor of stage, screen, and television. He appeared in the 1956 film Moby Dick and the 1962 film Mutiny on the Bounty.

== Early life and education ==
Patrick Joseph Noel Purcell was the son of Dublin auctioneer Pierce Purcell and his second wife Catherine (née Hoban), an antique dealer. He was born at 11a, Lower Mercer Street, one of two houses owned by his mother's family.

Purcell was educated at Synge Street CBS. He lost the tip of his right index finger while making cigarette vending machines, and was also missing his entire left index finger due to a different accident while he was an apprentice carpenter, a feature which he exploited for dramatic effect in the film Mutiny on the Bounty (1962).

== Career ==
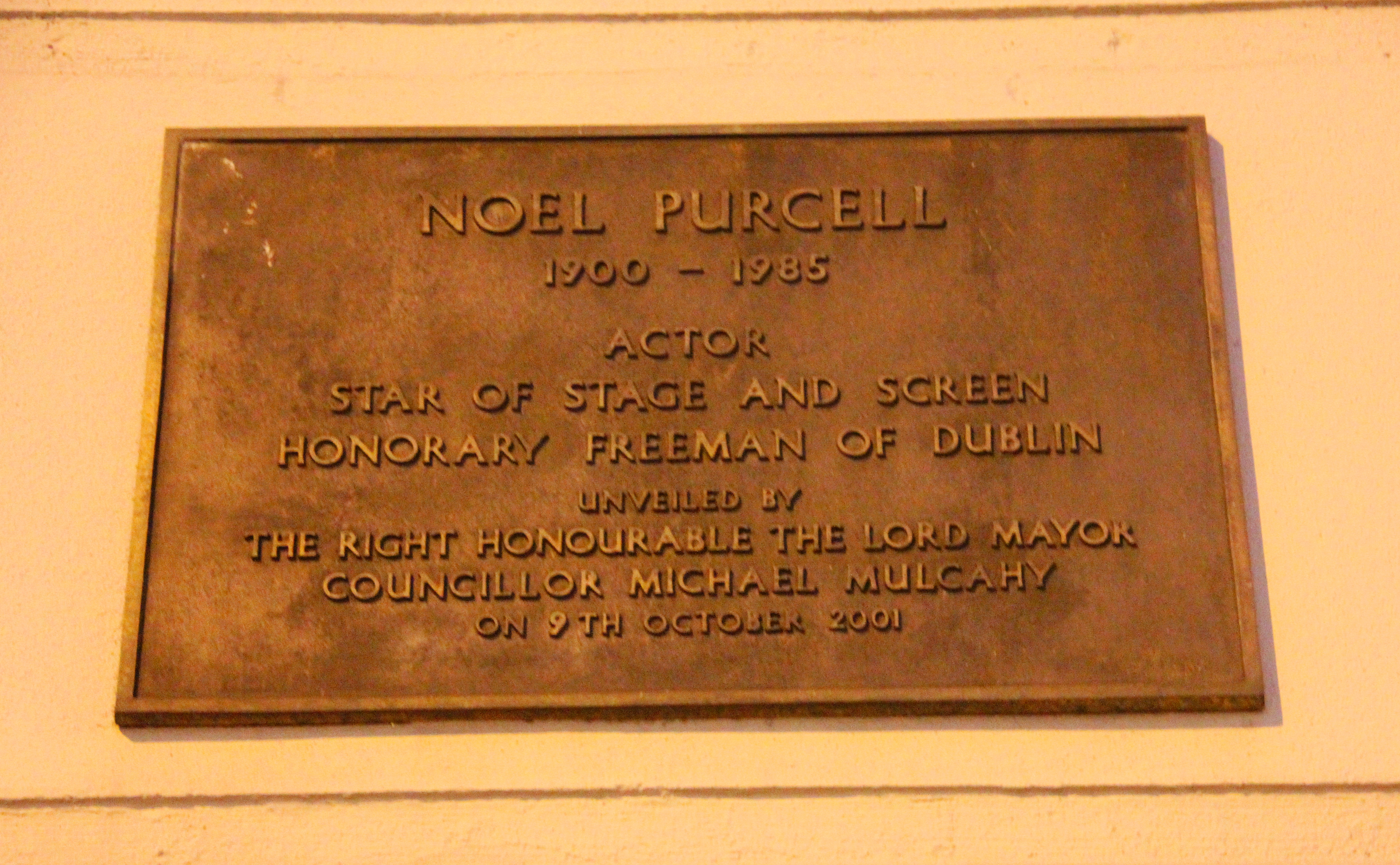
Plaque in Noel Purcell Walk in Dublin, Ireland

Purcell began his show business career at the age of 12 in Dublin's Gaiety Theatre. Later, he toured Ireland in a vaudeville act with Jimmy O'Dea.

Stage-trained in the classics in Dublin, Purcell moved into films in 1934. He appeared in Captain Boycott (1947) and as the elderly sailor whose death marooned the lovers-to-be in the first sound film version of The Blue Lagoon (1949). He played a member of Captain Ahab's crew in Moby Dick (1956), Dan O'Flaherty in episode one, The Majesty of the Law, of The Rising of the Moon (1957), a gamekeeper in The List of Adrian Messenger (1963), and a barman in The Mackintosh Man (1973); the last two films were directed by John Huston.

In 1955, he was an off-and-on regular on the British filmed TV series The Buccaneers (released to American TV in 1956). He narrated a Hibernian documentary, Seven Wonders of Ireland (1959). In 1962, he portrayed the lusty William McCoy in Lewis Milestone's Mutiny on the Bounty. He played a taciturn Irish in-law to Lebanese American entertainer Danny Thomas's character Danny Williams in a 1963 episode of The Danny Thomas Show. In 1971, he played the caring rabbi in the children's musical drama Flight of the Doves.

He was the subject of This Is Your Life in 1958 when he was surprised by Eamonn Andrews at the BBC Television Theatre.

Purcell also gained some recognition as a singer. Shortly after World War II, songwriter Leo Maguire composed "The Dublin Saunter" for him. He performed the song live for many years and later recorded it for the Glenside label. However, the recording was not a hit. As Purcell recalled many years later, "I don't think one person in the world bought it." However, over time it became one of the most favourite songs about Dublin, receiving countless air plays on radio programmes. In his later years, Purcell was asked by RTÉ journalist Colm Connolly whether he had received many royalties down the years. Purcell replied: "Not a penny. I recorded it as a favour for a pal, Leo Maguire, who'd written it. No contract or anything, so I never got a fee or any payments."

In 1981 he recorded a spoken word version of Pete St. John's "Dublin in the Rare Old Times".

In June 1984, Purcell was given the Freedom of the City of Dublin. Nine months later, he died in his native city at the age of 84.

== Personal life ==
On 7 July 1941, Purcell married former child actress Eileen Marmion. They had four sons.

== Selected filmography ==
- Jimmy Boy (1935)
- Knight Without Armour (1937) as First Train Driver Trying to Clear Track (uncredited)
- Blarney (1938) as Sergeant Hogan
- Odd Man Out (1947) as Tram Conductor (uncredited)
- Captain Boycott (1947) as Daniel McGinty
- The Blue Lagoon (1949) as Paddy Button
- Saints and Sinners (1949) as Flaherty
- Talk of a Million (1951) as Matty McGrath
- No Resting Place (1951) as Garda Mannigan
- Appointment with Venus (1951) as Trawler Langley
- Encore (1951) as Tom, Captain (Segment "Winter Cruise")
- Father's Doing Fine (1952) as Shaughneesy
- The Crimson Pirate (1952) as Pablo Murphy
- The Pickwick Papers (1952) as Roker
- Decameron Nights (1953) as Father Francisco
- Grand National Night (1953) as Philip Balfour
- Doctor in the House (1954) as The Padre (uncredited)
- The Seekers (1954) as Paddy Clarke
- Mad About Men (1954) as Percy
- Svengali (1954) as Patrick O'Ferrall
- Douglas Fairbanks, Jr., Presents (1955) as Willie Hosmer
- Doctor at Sea (1955) as Corbie
- Jacqueline (1956) as Mr. Owen
- Moby Dick (1956) as Ship's Carpenter
- Lust for Life (1956) as Anton Mauve
- The Buccaneers (1 episode, 1956) as Pat
- The Adventures of Sir Lancelot (1 episode, 1956) as Liam
- Doctor at Large (1957) as The Padre – Bartender
- The Rising of the Moon (1957) as Dan O'Flaherty (1st Episode)
- Merry Andrew (1958) as Matthew Larabee
- Rooney (1958) as Tim Hennesy
- The Key (1958) as Hotel Porter
- Rockets Galore! (1958) as Father James
- Shake Hands with the Devil (1959) as Liam O'Sullivan
- Ferry to Hong Kong (1959) as Joe Skinner, Chief Engineer
- Tommy the Toreador (1959) as Captain
- Make Mine Mink (1960) as Burglar
- Watch Your Stern (1960) as Adm. Sir Humphrey Pettigrew
- The Millionairess (1960) as Prof. Merton
- Man in the Moon (1960) as Prospector
- The Three Worlds of Gulliver (1960) as Capt. Pritchard (uncredited)
- No Kidding (1961) as Tandy
- Double Bunk (1961) as O'Malley
- Johnny Nobody (1961) as Brother Timothy
- Three Spare Wives (1962) as Sir Hubert
- The Iron Maiden (1962) as Admiral Sir Digby Trevelyan
- Mutiny on the Bounty (1962) as Seaman William McCoy
- Make Room for Daddy (1962) as Francis Daly
- Nurse on Wheels (1963) as Abel Worthy
- The Running Man (1963) as Miles Bleeker
- The List of Adrian Messenger (1963) as Countryman (uncredited)
- The DuPont Show of the Week (1 episode, 1963) as Meager
- The Ceremony (1963) as Finigan
- Lord Jim (1965) as Captain Chester in the courtroom of the "Patna" trial
- The Avengers (1 episode, 1965) as Jonah Barnard
- Doctor in Clover (1966) as O'Malley
- The Saint (2 episodes, 1964–1966) as Brendan Cullin / Mike Kelly
- Drop Dead Darling (1966) as Capt. Daniel O'Flannery
- Dr. Finlay's Casebook (1 episode, 1967) as Alexander Craig
- The Violent Enemy (1967) as John Michael Leary
- I Spy (1 episode, 1967) as Fletcher
- Sinful Davey (1969) as Jock
- Where's Jack? (1969) as Leatherchest
- Dixon of Dock Green (1 episode, 1969) as Thomas
- The McKenzie Break (1970) as Ferry Captain (uncredited)
- Flight of the Doves (1971) as Rabbi
- The Onedin Line (1 episode, 1972) as Hennessy
- The Mackintosh Man (1973) as O'Donovan
- The Irish R.M. (1 episode, 1984) as O'Reilly (final appearance)

== See also ==
- List of people on the postage stamps of Ireland
