= Maureen Potter =

Irish actress (1925–2004)

- Born: Maria Philomena Potter; 3 January 1925; Fairview, Dublin, Ireland
- Died: 7 April 2004 (aged 79); Clontarf, Dublin, Ireland
- Resting place: Clontarf Cemetery
- Other names: Maureen Potter
- Occupations: Singer, actress, comedienne, performer
- Years active: 1938—2004
- Height: 4 ft 11 in (1.50 m)
- Spouse: Jack O'Leary (m. 1959–2004)
- Children: John, Hugh

Maria Philomena Potter (3 January 1925 – 7 April 2004), known as Maureen Potter, was an Irish singer, actress, comedienne and performer.

== Early life ==
Potter was born in Dublin and educated at St. Mary's school in Fairview. She had a long career in Irish theatre, mainly as Ireland's première comedienne, but also as a straight actress. She was a regular performer at the Gaiety Theatre in Dublin and for many years starred in Christmas pantomime. She became the first star to have a bronze cast of her handprints outside the theatre. She married Jack O'Leary in 1959, an Irish army officer whom she had first met in 1943, and he wrote most of her comedic material.

=== Career ===
Among Potter's many dramatic roles in the theatre was that of Maisie Madigan in Juno and the Paycock. While still a teenager, she toured abroad before World War II as a singer and dancer with Jack Hylton (known as Jack Haylton and his orchestra). On a tour of Germany, they once performed in front of Adolf Hitler and other Nazis. In January 1938, Potter appeared on the BBC Television Service with Jack Hylton and his Band. Film of her performance is held by the Alexandra Palace Television Society. In 2001, the Archivist of the Alexandra Palace Television Society gave Potter a copy of her 1938 television appearance, and she recalled her memories:

"I was 13 years of age when I appeared with the Jack Hylton Band in RadiOlympia, a programme that went out on television all those years ago. What I remember most is the heavy ochre make-up the performers had to wear. I was excused the make-up for some reason; maybe mine was such a long shot that it was not deemed necessary. If you blink you miss me! However, June Malo, the Henderson Twins, Peggy Dell, Bruce Trent and Freddie Schweitzer had this heavy ochre make-up plastered on them. Plastered is the only word! Having toured with them for over 12-months and used to seeing them in stage make-up they looked very strange. Mr Hylton was excused also. He was always Mr Hylton to me. He called me "Morine", (the American pronunciation, and was a kind man who made such a difference to my career. He always wore those two-tone shoes that were so popular at the time. It is wonderful to see him so trim and dapper in the tape, which Simon Vaughan has sent me."

Potter first appeared professionally with Jimmy O'Dea in pantomime and appeared frequently on television and in cabaret. She played the role of Dante Riordan in Joseph Strick's film, A Portrait of the Artist as a Young Man (1977).

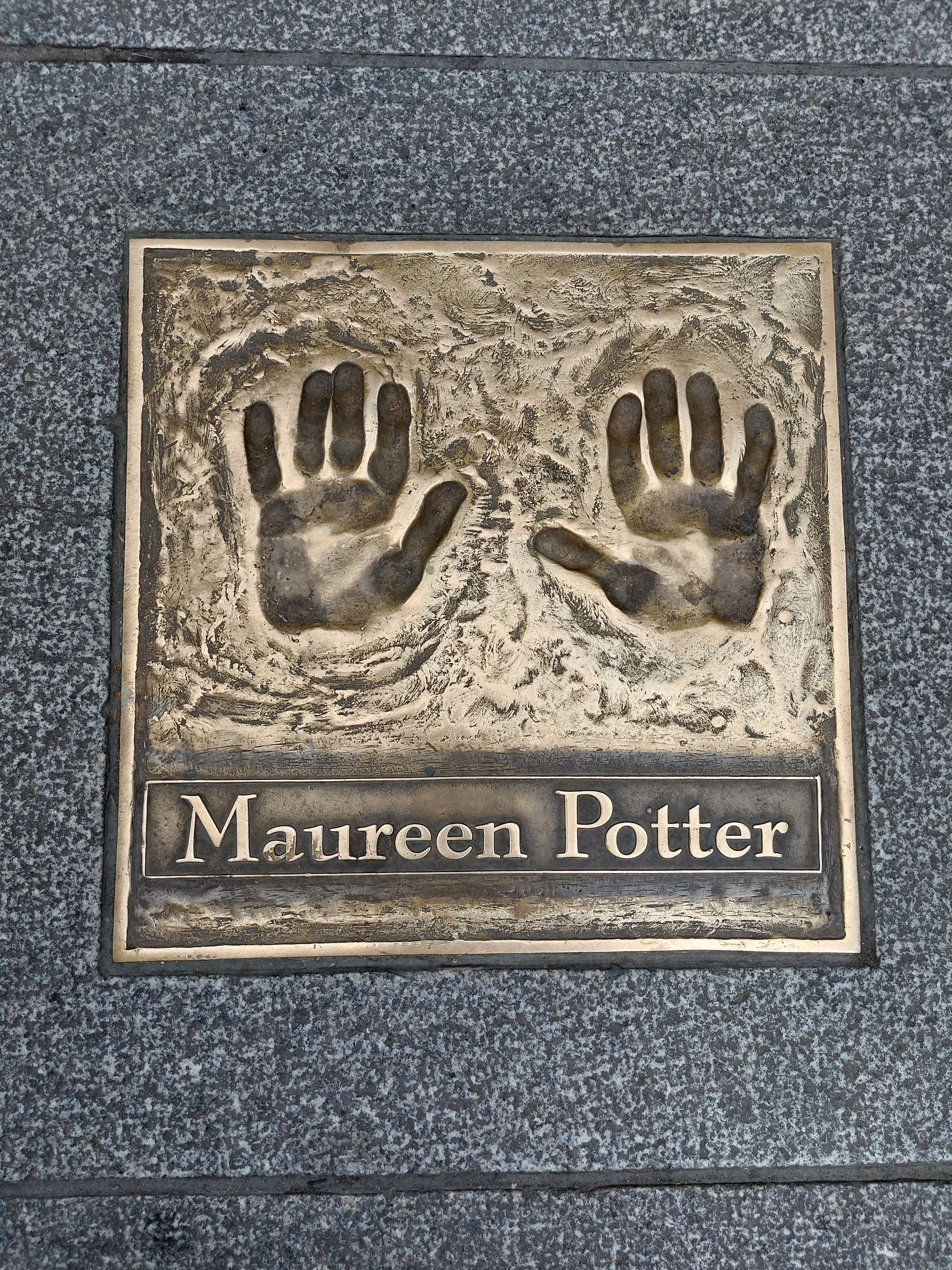
Maureen Potter's hand prints in bronze outside the Gaiety Theatre in Dublin

In the 1970s, Potter appeared alongside puppets in adverts for Jacob's Mikado, Kimberley and Coconut Cream biscuits, with the line "Someone you love would love some mum".

== Later life and death ==
External image
- Potter's gravestone at St. John the Baptist cemetery in Clontarf

Potter was conferred with the Freedom of the City of Dublin in 1984, and was later awarded an honorary degree from Trinity College Dublin in 1988. She died in her sleep at her home in Clontarf on 7 April 2004, at the age of 79. She was survived by her husband, Jack O'Leary and her sons, John and Hugh.

== Filmography ==
Year	Title	Role	Notes
1957	The Rising of the Moon	Pegeen Mallory – barmaid	(2nd Episode)
1958	Gideon's Day	Mrs. Ethel Sparrow	
1967	Ulysses	Josie Breen	
1977	A Portrait of the Artist as a Young Man	Dante	
1997	How to Cheat in the Leaving Certificate	Una's Mother	

== Advertising ==
In the late 1970s she advertised Jacob's biscuits.
