= Queen's Theatre, Dublin =

Coordinates: 53.344938°N 6.254622°W

- Adelphi Theatre
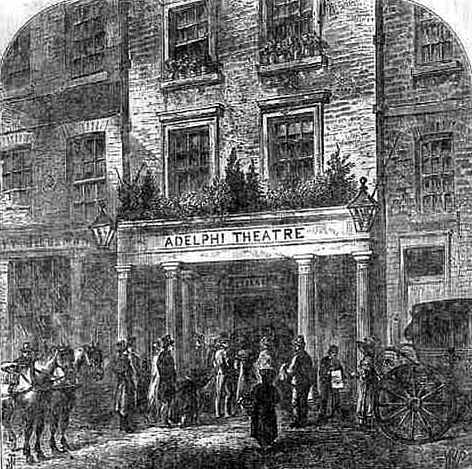
- Adelphi Theatre (1829–1844)
- Interactive map of Queen's Theatre, Dublin
- Address: Pearse Street; Dublin 2 Ireland
- Type: patent theatre

Construction
- Opened: 1829
- Closed: 1969
- Rebuilt: 1909

The Queen's Theatre, Dublin, located in Pearse Street was originally built in 1829 as the Adelphi Theatre. This building was demolished in 1844 and rebuilt. It reopened that same year as the Queens Royal Theatre, the new owner having been granted a Royal Patent to operate as a patent theatre. The theatre quickly became known as simply the Queen's.

It was most famous in the 20th century as the home of the Happy Gang, a troupe of comics, singers and musicians including Danny Cummins, Jimmy Harvey, Mick Eustace and Cecil Nash. The regular members of the "gang" took part in sketches as required, but in addition each had to be a solo performer in his own right.

== Suspected political associations ==
During the War of Independence, popular Queen's Theatre manager John Lawrence Christopher "Jack" Sullivan made headlines across Ireland when he was arrested by the military in the early hours of Thursday, 14 October 1920 on suspicion of Sinn Féin membership in the weeks leading up to Bloody Sunday.

Sullivan had been assistant manager for many years but only weeks earlier had replaced Charlie Wright as manager.

The British military broke open the back door of his home at 28 Lower Mount St sometime after 1am.

Upholstered chairs were ripped open, pictures dismantled, and doors were torn off two cabinets, and papers examined in a 'long thorough search' of Sullivan's home, in the dark, as the gas meter was broken.

The military surrounded and raided houses number 28, 29, and 30, which belonged to Sullivan's mother-in-law Margaret O'Mara née Cronan.

Sullivan was taken onto Lower Mount St in his night attire and questioned about Sinn Féin battalion membership, along with a Queen's actor who rented a room upstairs, J Clancy.

Sullivan, and a 17-year-old student lodger named Mr Herriott from Nenagh at number 29, was arrested under the defence of the realm regulations by General Boyd and taken to Ship St Barracks at Dublin Castle.

It is believed he was released without charge the following day.

Neither had any connection with politics, 'and their arrests have occasioned much surprise'.

A month later, six doors up, British Army Intelligence Officer Lieutenant Henry Angliss (cover name 'Patrick McMahon',) was shot by the IRA at 22 Lower Mount Street on Bloody Sunday.

The military returned to number 30 the following Monday night and arrested Sullivan's brother-in-law William Frances O'Mara, but it's not believed any charges were laid.

Sullivan resigned in 1924 to pursue other theatrical enterprises.

== Union controversy ==
Eleven men were brought before the Dublin District Court and bound to six months of good behaviour, and banned from picketing the Queens Theatre, after they were charged with illegal picketing in late 1924.

It was a muscle-flexing exercise by trade unionist James Larkin and his new Worker's Union of Ireland, following the theatre's ownership change the previous week.

Larkin had just been released from Sing Sing and had returned to Ireland the previous year, and had fallen out of favour with his former union, the ITGWU.

== Final days ==
The Abbey Theatre took over the building after the Abbey fire of 1951 and remained until July 1966. The lease was then put up for sale. Trinity College Dublin were the ground landlords, but the Department of Education refused to grant them the funds to purchase the building. The lease was purchased by Herbert McNally, who was involved in the cinema business. He attempted to secure planning permission to build an office block, and when this was refused he sold it to George Colley. The theatre closed in 1969 and was demolished in 1975.

The new building, Áras An Phiarsaigh, was built on the site.
