= Acting Irish International Theatre Festival =

The Acting Irish International Theatre Festival (AIITF) is an annual festival of full-length Irish plays performed by Irish community theater companies from Canada, US and Ireland. The festival was started in 1994 and is performed in a different city each year.

== 1994 Festival; Winnipeg ==
The concept of the Acting Irish International Theater Festival (AIITF) was originated by three Irish community theater groups: the Tara Players of Winnipeg, Milwaukee Irish Arts, and Na Fianna Theatre of Minneapolis-St. Paul. These three groups held several invitational performances in each other's city between 1990 and 1993, and all three groups participated in the 1991 Milwaukee Irish Fest. The Tara Players of Winnipeg participated in the Milwaukee Irish Fest in 1992 and 1993 as well, but because that festival was dedicated primarily to Irish music, the three groups co-founded the theater-only AIITF in 1994. The first festival was held in Winnipeg, Manitoba, Canada March 10–13, 1994 and presented at the Tara Players' theater at the Irish Association of Manitoba. One of the founders of the festival was Geoff White of the Tara Player of Ottawa.

Company	City	Production	Author
Milwaukee Irish Arts	Milwaukee, WI	The Poker Session	Hugh Leonard
Ashling Productions	Calgary, AB	(a pair of one act plays)	
Tara Players	Winnipeg, MB	Remembrance	Graham Reid
Na Fianna	Minneapolis-St. Paul, MN	Translations	Brian Friel

== 1995 Festival; Minneapolis ==
The 1995 AIITF was held March 9–11 at the Weyerhaeuser Auditorium in Landmark Center, 75 W. 5th St., St. Paul, Minnesota, USA. Five organizations participated, hosted by Na Fianna of Minneapolis-St. Paul. The adjudicators were Mona Poehling, Dan Sullivan and Ethna McKiernan.

Company	City	Production	Author
Milwaukee Irish Arts	Milwaukee, WI	I Do Not Like Thee, Dr. Fell	Bernard Farrell
Ashling Productions	Calgary, AB	Dancing at Lughnasa	Brian Friel
Tara Players	Winnipeg, MB	Away Alone	Janet Noble
Na Fianna	Minneapolis-St. Paul, MN	Famine	Tom Murphy
Lartigue Theatre	Listowel, Ireland	The Estuary and The Tentmaker	Paddy Fitzgibbon

== 1996 Festival; Calgary ==
In 1996, the AIITF was held in Calgary, Alberta, Canada May 15 to 19, 1996 at the Irish Cultural Center. The festival adjudicators were Christopher Foreman, Pat Benedict, and Dr. Richard Wall. Six groups participated:

Company	City	Production	Author
Milwaukee Irish Arts	Milwaukee, WI	Moll	John B. Keane
Ashling Productions	Calgary, AB	The Death of Humpty Dumpty	Graham Reid
Tara Players	Winnipeg, MB	The Sea Horse	Edward J. Moore
Stage Éireann Dramatic Society	Vancouver, BC	The Love of Cass McGuire	Brian Friel
St. Albert Irish Society	St. Albert, Alberta	Time Was	Hugh Leonard
Prince George Theatre Workshop	Prince George, BC	Someone to Watch Over Me	Frank McGuiness

In addition to these formal festival productions, two "showcase" (non-adjudicated) productions were presented: Winners (from Lovers: Winners and Losers) by Brian Friel, presented by the Liffey Players of Calgary, and Bag Lady, by Frank McGuiness, presented by Patabesin Productions, Calgary.

== 1997 Festival; Milwaukee ==
In 1997, the AIITF was held in Milwaukee, Wisconsin, USA at the Scottish Rite Cathedral, 790 N. Van Buren St. May 14–17. Adjudicators for this festival were Milwaukee actress Laura Gordon; Christopher Foreman, former artistic director of the Northern Arts and Cultural Center in Yellowknife, Northwest Territories, Canada; and Ray Yeates, who was the youngest director in the history of Dublin's Abbey Theatre.

Company	City	Production	Author
Milwaukee Irish Arts	Milwaukee, WI	The Broken Jug	John Banville
Tara Players	Winnipeg, MB	The Field	John B. Keane
Na Fianna	Minneapolis-St. Paul, MN	John Bull's Other Island	George Bernard Shaw
Gaelic Park Players	Chicago, IL	The Year of the Hiker	John B. Keane
Irish Players of Prince George	Prince George, BC	The Bold Girls	Rona Munro
John Fitzgerald Theatre	New York, NY	Away With a Sailor	Brendan Loonam
Aisling Productions	Calgary	The Good Thing	John B. Keane

The Best Production award in 1997 was presented to Tara Players of Winnipeg, for their production of The Field. Tadhg McMahon of the Tara Players was also presented with the Best Supporting Male award for his performance as Tadhg McCabe.

Note: The 2004 AIITF program lists the New York participant at the 1997 AIITF as the John Fitzgerald Theatre; the Milwaukee Journal Sentinel article of May 14, 1997, lists the group as the Thomas Davis Players.

== 1998 Festival; Winnipeg ==
The AIITF in 1998 returned to Winnipeg, Manitoba, and was held at the Gas Station Theatre May 13–16, 1998. Groups from Toronto, Ottawa and Chicago joined the festival.

=== Productions ===
Company	City	Production	Author
Milwaukee Irish Arts	Milwaukee, WI	Greatest Hits and Blood Guilty	Seán O'Casey (Hits) and Antoine O'Flatharta (Guilty)
Ashling Productions	Calgary, AB	Women on the Verge of HRT	Marie Jones
Tara Players	Winnipeg, MB	The Shadow of a Gunman	Seán O'Casey
Na Fianna	Minneapolis-St. Paul, MN	Faith Healer	Brian Friel
Toronto Irish Players	Toronto, ON	Lovers - Winners and Losers	Brian Friel
Tara Players of Ottawa	Ottawa, ON	Rat in the Skull	Ron Hutchinson
Gaelic Park Players	Chicago IL	Paul Twining	George Shiels

=== Awards in 1998 ===
Award	Actor	Role	Play	Company
Best Production			The Rat in the Skull	Tara Players of Ottawa
Lead Male	Eric O'Brien and Don Quiring		The Rat in the Skull	Tara Players of Ottawa
Lead Female	(Information unavailable)		Lovers-Winners and Losers	Toronto Irish Players
Supporting Male	Stephen Meehan		The Shadow of a Gunman	Tara Players
Supporting Female	(Information unavailable)		Lovers-Winners and Losers	Toronto Irish Players

== 1999 Festival; Chicago ==
The Gaelic Park Players hosted the AIITF in Chicago, Illinois May 25–30, 1999.

=== Productions in 1999 ===
Company	City	Production	Author
Milwaukee Irish Arts	Milwaukee, WI	The Country Boy	John Murphy
Innishfree Irish Theatre	Boca Raton, FL	Frugal Comforts	Eamonn Kelly
Tara Players	Winnipeg, MB	44 Sycamore Street	Bernard Farrell
Na Fianna	Minneapolis-St. Paul, MN	Rhapsody in Stephen's Green	Flann O'Brien
Irish American Heritage Center	Chicago, IL	Monday Night in a Country Town	Tom O'Brien
Tir Na Og Theatre	Denver, CO	Waiting for Godot	Samuel Beckett
Tara Players of Ottawa	Ottawa, ON	A Little Like Paradise	Niall Williams
Toronto Irish Players	Toronto, ON	Drama at Inish	Lennox Robinson
Gaelic Park Players	Chicago, IL	The Chastitute	John B. Keane

=== Awards in 1999 ===
Award	Actor	Role	Play	Company
Best Production			Frugal Comforts	Innisfree Theatre
Lead Male	Tony Cohen	Estragon	Waiting for Godot	Tír Na Nóg Theatre
Lead Female	Amy Flynn	Julia	The Country Boy	Milwaukee Irish Arts
Supporting Male	Teige Reid	Eddie Twohig	Drama at Inish	Toronto Irish Players
Supporting Female	Vera Kelly	Eva Kishock	The Chastitute	Gaelic Park Players

== 2000 Festival; Toronto ==
The Toronto Irish Players, of Toronto, Ontario, Canada, hosted the AIITF in 2000. The festival included the North American debt of The Wheeping of Angles by Joseph O'Connor, brother of Sinéad O'Connor.

=== 2000 Productions ===
Company	City	Production	Author
Tir Na Og Theatre	Denver, CO	(information unavailable)	
Innishfree Irish Theatre	Boca Raton, FL	(information unavailable)	
Tara Players of Ottawa	Ottawa, MB	The Broken Jug	John Banville
Gaelic Park Players	Chicago, IL	Thy Will Be Done	Michael Carey
Tara Players	Winnipeg, MB	The Weeping of Angels	Joseph O'Connor
Ashling Productions	Calgary, AB	Frugal Comforts	Eamonn Kelly
Na Fianna	Minneapolis-St. Paul, MN	Bailegangaire	Tom Murphy
Toronto Irish Players	Toronto, ON	The Steward of Christendom	Sebastian Barry
Milwaukee Irish Arts	Milwaukee, WI	The Au Pair Man	Hugh Leonard

=== 2000 Awards ===
Award	Actor	Role	Play	Company
Best Production			Frugal Comforts	Aisling Productions
Lead Male	Martin Kelly		Frugal Comforts	Aisling Productions
Lead Female	Tena May Gallivan	Mary	Bailegangaire	Na Fianna Irish Theatre
Supporting Male	Kenny McCullagh		Frugal Comforts	Aisling Productions
Supporting Female	Vera Kelly	Bridie	Thy Will Be Done	Gaelic Park Players
Adjudicator's Award	Deirdre Halferty	Directing		

== 2001 Festival; Denver ==
In 2001, the AIITF was held in Denver, Colorado, USA, at the Courtyard Theatre, Auraria Campus, the University of Colorado Denver, on May 15–19, 2001. The festival was hosted by Tir Na nOg, whose name mean in Irish (Gaelic) "everlasting youth". A special performance by PHAMALy (Physically Handicapped Actors and Musical Artists League), as guests artists, was also presented at this festival.

Company	City	Production	Author
Tir Na Og Theatre	Denver, CO	Iph ...	Colin Teevan
Innishfree Irish Theatre	Boca Raton, FL	The Cripple of Innishmaan	Martin McDonagh
Tara Players of Ottawa	Ottawa, ON	The Poker Session	Hugh Leonard
Gaelic Park Players	Chicago, IL	The Course	Brendan O'Carroll
Tara Players	Winnipeg, MB	Brothers of the Brush	Jimmy Murphy
Ashling Prolductions	Calgary, AB	Beauty Queen of Leenane	Martin McDonagh
Toronto Irish Players	Toronto, ON	Happy Birthday Dear Alice	Bernard Farrell
Milwaukee Irish Arts	Milwaukee, WI	The Cavalcaders	Billy Roche

The Best Production award in 2001 was presented to Innisfree Irish Theatre for their production of The Cripple of Innishmaan, by Martin McDonagh. Sean Mac Donnchadha, of Innisfree Irish Theatre, received the acting award for Best Lead Male Actor as JohnnyPateenMike in The Cripple of Innishmaan

== 2002 Festival; Ottawa ==
The AIITF was held in the Capital of Canada, Ottawa, in 2002.

Company	City	Production	Author
Shapeshifters Theatre	Chicago, IL	"Sacrilege" Diane Shaffer	
Tir Na Og Theatre	Denver, CO	"Paddywack" Daniel Magee	
Innishfree Irish Theatre	Boca Raton, FL	"Moonshine" Jim Nolan	
Tara Players of Ottawa	Ottawa, ON	Sive	John B. Keane
Gaelic Park Players	Chicago, IL	The Salvage Shop	Jim Nolan
Tara Players	Winnipeg, MB	Our Lady of Sligo	Sebastian Barry
Aisling Productions	Calgary, AB	"The Lonesome West" Martin McDonagh	
Milwaukee Irish Arts	Milwaukee, WI	Molly Sweeney	Brian Friel
Toronto Irish Players	Toronto, ON	"Da" Hugh Leonard	

The Best Production award was presented to the Toronto Irish Players for their production of Da by Hugh Leonard

== 2003 Festival; Florida ==
Innishfree Irish Theatre hosted the 2003 AIITF at The Crest Theatre, Del Ray Beach, Florida, May 11–17, 2003. The 2003 Festival also featured, for the first time, three groups invited from Ireland. This festival featured the first North American production of Paddy Irishman, Paddy Englishman, and Paddy. . .? by Declan Croghan.

Company	City	Production	Author
Irish Players of Rochester	Rochester, NY	Someone Who'll Watch Over Me	Frank McGuinness
Innishfree Irish Theatre	Boca Raton, FL	Happy Birthday, Dear Alice	Bernard Farrell
Tara Players of Ottawa	Ottawa, ON	Bold Girls	Rona Munro
Milwaukee Irish Arts	Milawukee, WI	The Weir	Conor McPherson
Tara Players	Winnipeg, MB	Paddy Irishman, Paddy Englishman, and Paddy. . .?	Declan Croghan
Ashling Productions	Calgary, AB	Belfry	Billy Roche
Toronto Irish Player	Toronto, ON	The Mai	Marina Carr
Shapeshifters Theatre	Chicago, IL	Dancing at Lughnasa	Brian Friel
The Hewlett-Packard Players	Kildare, Ireland	44 Sycamore Street	Bernard Farrell
Dundalk Theatre Workshop	Dundalk, Ireland	Port Authority	Conor McPherson
The Balally Players	Dublin, Ireland	The Country Boy	John Murphy

The Best Production award was presented to the Tara Players of Winnipeg for their production of Paddy Irishman, Paddy Englishman, and Paddy. . .? James Bowman won the award for Best Actor in the same production The Irish Players of Rochester, an invitational group at this, their first festival, were awarded "Best Invitational Production" for Someone Who'll Watch Over Me.

== 2004 Festival; Winnipeg ==
The 2004 AIITF returned to Winnipeg for the third time, hosted by the Tara Players at the Manitoba Theatre for Young People, May 20–22, 2004.

=== 2004 Productions ===
Company	City	Production	Author
Irish Players of Rochester	Rochester, NY	Waiting for Godot	Samuel Beckett
Innishfree Irish Theatre	Boca Raton, FL	Elipsed	Patricia Burke Brogan
Tara Players	Winnipeg, MB	Juno and the Paycock	Seán O'Casey
Toronto Irish Players	Toronto, ON	The Cripple of Inishmaan	Martin McDonagh
Gaelic Park Players	Chicago, IL	Anyone Could Rob a Bank	Thomas Coffey

The scheduled performance of the Gaelic Park Players was canceled due to weather problems.

=== 2004 Awards ===
Award	Actor	Role	Play	Company
Best Production			Waiting for Godot	Irish Players of Rochester
Lead Male	Kevin O'Shea	JohnnyPateenMike	The Cripple of Inishmaan	Toronto Irish Players
Lead Female	Barnara Taylor & Cliona Kenny	Kate & Eileen	The Cripple of Inishmaan	Toronto Irish Players
Supporting Male	Ken Bordner	Pozzo	Waiting for Godot	Irish Players of Rochester
Supporting Female	Lori Dolan	Bridget	Eclipsed	Innisfree Irish Theatre
Adjudicator's Award	The Cast	Ensemble performance	Eclipsed	Innisfree Irish Theatre

== 2005 Festival; Chicago ==
The AIITF returned to Chicago in 2005, hosted by Gaelic Park Players at the Beverly Arts Center, 2407 W. 111th St., May 18–21, 2005.

=== 2005 Productions ===
Company	City	Production	Author
Irish Players of Rochester	Rochester, NY	The Kings of the Kilburn High Road	Jimmy Murphy
Innishfree Irish Theatre	Boca Raton, FL	Abie's Irish Rose	Anne Nichols
Tara Players	Winnipeg, MB	I do Not Like Thee, Dr. Fell	Bernard Farrell
Toronto Irish Players	Toronto, ON	Tea in a China Cup	Christina Reid
Gaelic Park Players	Chicago, IL	The Country Boy	John Murphy
Milwaukee Irish Arts	Milwaukee, WI	O Parnassus	Hugh Carr
Shapeshifters Theatre	Chicago, IL	A Mislaid Heaven	Carson Grace Becker

=== 2005 Awards ===
Award	Actor	Role	Play	Company
Best Production			A Mislaid Heaven	Shapeshifters Theatre
Lead Male	John Jaeger	Jap	The Kings of the Kilburn High Road	Irish Players of Rochester
Lead Female	Katie Cheely	Ruth	A Mislaid Heaven	Shapeshifters Theatre
Supporting Male	Sidney Gray	Paddy	I Do Not Like Thee, Dr. Fell	The Tara Players
Supporting Female	Amy Kull	Arlene	O Parnassus	Milwaukee Irish Arts
Adjudicator's Award	Anastasia O'Brien	Susy	I Do Not Like Thee, Dr. Fell	The Tara Players

== 2006 Festival; Toronto ==
The 2006 AIITF was hosted by the Toronto Irish Players at the Young Centre for the Performing Arts May 30 to June 3. The festival was hosted by the thirty-year-old Toronto Irish Players, which performed The Plough and the Stars by Seán O'Casey, featuring nine transplanted Dubliners in the cast.

=== 2006 Productions ===
Company	City	Production	Author
Irish Players of Rochester	Rochester, NY	Dancing at Lughnasa	Brian Friel
Innishfree Irish Theatre	Boca Raton, FL	The Shaughraun	Dion Boucicault
Tara Players	Winnipeg, MB	Poor Beast in the Rain	Billy Roche
Toronto Irish Players	Toronto, ON	The Plough and the Stars	Seán O'Casey
Gaelic Park Players	Chicago, IL	The Able Dealer	J. B. MacCarthy
Milwaukee Irish Arts	Milwaukee, WI	An Irish Play	Dan O'Brien
Shapeshifters Theatre	Chicago, IL	Sea Marks	Gardner McKay
Estuary Players	Dublin, Ireland	The Beauty Queen of Leenane	Martin McDonagh

=== 2006 Awards ===
Award	Actor	Role	Play	Company
Best Production			An Irish Play	Milwaukee Irish Arts
Lead Male	Keith Tamsett	Declan	An Irish Play	Milwaukee Irish Arts
Lead Female	Jackie Murphy and Grainne Jordan	(shared)	The Beauty Queen of Leenane	Estuary Players
Supporting Male	Robert Wall	Stephen	Poor Beast in the Rain	The Tara Players
Supporting Female	Crystal Marie Taylor	Rose	Dancing at Lughnasa	Irish Players of Rochester
Adjudicator's Award			The Shaughraun	Innisfree Irish Theatre

== 2007 Festival; Milwaukee ==
Milwaukee Irish Arts hosted the 2007 AIITF at the University of Wisconsin in Milwaukee, May 15 to 20.

=== 2007 Productions ===
Note: Starting with this festival, Innisfree Irish Theatre changed its name to the Irish Theatre of Florida.

Company	City	Production	Author
Milwaukee Irish Arts	Milwaukee, WI	From These Green Heights	Dermot Bolger
The Tara Players	Winnipeg, MB	The Spirit of Annie Ross	Bernard Farrell
Gaelic Park Players	Chicago, IL	Getting Buried	Peter Cunningham
Irish Theatre of Florida	Boca Raton, FL	Lovers: Losers and Winners	Brian Friel
Holding Court Theatre	Doublin, Ireland	Summer	Hugh Leonard
Irish Players of Rochester	Rochester NY	Faith Healer	Brian Friel
Toronto Irish Players	Toronto, ON	At The Black Pig's Dyke	Vincent Woods

=== 2007 Awards ===
Award	Actor	Role	Play	Company
Best Production			At The Black Pig's Dyke	Toronto Irish Players
Lead Male	David Kyle	Teddy	Faith Healer	Irish Players of Rochester
Lead Female	Lucy Carabine	Miss Funny	At the Black Pig's Dyke	Toronto Irish Players
Supporting Male	Gerry Herbert	Richard Halvey	Summer	Holding Court Theatre
Supporting Female	Jane Testar	Ashling	The Spirit of Annie Ross	Tara Players
Adjudicator's Award			Getting Buried	Gaelic Park Players

Special Adjudicator Award: Gaelic Park Players "For a very entertaining, if completely insane, romp through the upper regions of Irish lunacy, confirming the old showbiz adage of 'leave them laughing when you go.'"

Honourable Mention: Costume Design for Holding Court Theatre for their production of Summer by Hugh Leonard and also for Toronto Irish Players for their production of At the Black Pig's Dyke by Vincent Woods.

In addition to the seven adjudicated productions, the 2007 Festival included two special presentations: Townlands, by Dermot Bolger; a reading presented by the students of the Theater Department of the University of Wisconsin at Milwaukee. Sneak preview of Walking the Road, also by Dermot Bolger. This play about Francis Ledwidge, a young Irish poet who lost his life in Flanders fields in 1917, while serving with the British army in World War I, had its world premiere at Axis Arts Center in Dublin June 9, 2007.

== 2008 Festival; Rochester ==
The Irish Players of Rochester, a program of the Rochester Community Players, hosted the 2008 AIITF at the Geva Theatre Center's NextStage Theatre May 13 to 17. The festival included two long one-act plays by the young Dublin playwright, Conor McPherson

=== 2008 Productions ===
Company	City	Production	Author
Irish Players of Rochester	Rochester NY	The Hostage	Brendan Behan
Irish Players of San Francisco	San Francisco CA	The Perfect Romance	Nicky O'Brien
Irish Theatre of Florida	Boca Raton, FL	On Raglan Road	Tom O'Brien
Irish-American Theater Company	Cincinnati, OH	A Little Like Paradise	Niall Williams
Holding Court Theatre	Dublin, Ireland	Happy Birthday Dear Alice	Bernard Farrell
Tara Players	Winnipeg, MB	Dublin Carol	Conor McPherson
Liffey Players	Calgary, AB	Shining City	Conor McPherson
Milwaukee Irish Arts	Milwaukee, WI	The Blowin of Baile Gall	Ronan Noone
Shapeshifters Theatre	Chicago, IL	Knocknashee	Deirdre Kinahan
Toronto Irish Players	Toronto, ON	The Muesli Belt	Jimmy Murphy

=== 2008 Awards ===
Award	Actor	Role	Play	Company
Best Production			Happy Birthday Dear Alice	Holding Court Theatre
Lead Male	Robert Wall	John Plunkett	Dublin Carol	Tara Players
Lead Female	Grace Perry	Alice	Happy Birthday Dear Alice	Holding Court Theatre
Supporting Male	Danny Sullivan	Mossy Plunkett	The Muesli Belt	Toronto Irish Players
Supporting Female	Kathryn Waters	Neasa	Shining City	Liffey Players of Calgary
Adjudicator's Award	The cast	Ensemble Acting	The Hostage	Irish Players of Rochester

== 2009 Festival; Winnipeg ==
For the fourth time, the Tara Players of Winnipeg hosted the AIITF, in May 2009.

=== 2009 Productions ===
Company	City	Production	Author
Toronto Irish Players	Toronto, ON	A Skull in Connemara	Martin McDonagh
Irish Players of Rochester	Rochester NY	Love in the Title	Hugh Leonard
Shapeshifters Theatre	Chicago, IL	Someone Who'll Watch Over Me	Frank McGuinness,
Gaelic Park Players	Chicago, IL	Attaboy, Mr. Synge	Deirdre Kinahan
Tara Players	Winnipeg, MB	The Patrick Pearce Motel	Hugh Leonard
Holding Court Theatre	Dublin, Ireland	Salute The Servant	Walter Macken
Liffey Players	Calgary, AB	The Weir	Conor McPherson
Irish Theatre of Florida	Boca Raton, FL	On Raglan Road	Tom O'Brien

=== 2009 Awards ===
Award	Actor	Role	Play	Company
Best Production			A Skull in Connemara	Toronto Irish Players
Lead Male	Stephen Farrell	Mairtin Hanlon	A Skull in Connemara	Toronto Irish Players production of
Lead Female	Lorelei Mellon	Cat	Love in the Title	Irish Players of Rochester
Supporting Male	Jonathan Musser	Adam	Someone Who'll Watch Over Me	Shapeshifters Theatre
Supporting Female	Neasa McCann	Kitty	Salute The Servant	Holding Court Theatre
Adjudicator's Award			Salute the Servant	Holding Court Theatre

== 2010 Festival; Chicago ==
The 2010 AIITF was held May 17 to 22, 2010 at the Irish-American Heritage Center, 4626 North Knox Avenue, Chicago.

=== 2010 Productions ===
(in order or presentation)

Company	City	Production	Author
Shapeshifters Theatre	Chicago, IL	And Neither Have I Wings to Fly	Ann Noble
Estuary Players	Dublin, Ireland	There Came a Gypsy Riding	Frank McGuinness
Gaelic Park Players	Chicago, IL	The Patrick Pearse Motel	Hugh Leonard
The Irish American Theatre Company	Cincinnati, OH	Moll	John B. Keane
Liffey Players Drama Society	Calgary, AB	Portia Coughlan	Marina Carr
Heads on Stage (formally part of Holding Court Theatre)	Dublin, Ireland	The Passion of Jerome	Dermot Bolger
Irish Theatre of Florida	South Florida	Close to Home	Pat Clark
Irish Players of Rochester (Rochester Community Players)	Rochester, NY	The Cripple of Inishmaan	Martin McDonagh
Toronto Irish Players	Toronto, ON	The Factory Girls	Frank McGuinness

=== 2010 Awards ===
Award	Actor	Role	Play	Company
Best Production			The Passion of Jerome	Heads on Stage, Dublin
Lead Male				
Lead Female	Barbara Kenny as Moll, Irish American Theater Company Cincinnati			
Supporting Male				
Supporting Female				
Adjudicator's Award				

== 2011 Festival; Calgary ==
The Liffey Players Drama Society of Calgary, Alberta, Canada, hosted the 2011 Festival at the Vertigo Theatre at the base of the Calgary Tower, from May 16–21, 2011.

=== 2011 Productions ===
Company	City	Production	Author
Liffey Players Drama Society	Calgary, AB	The Seafarer	Conor McPherson
Estuary Players	Dublin, Ireland	Same Old Moon	Geraldine Aaron
An Amharclann	Saint John, NB	Pride of Parnell Street	Sebastian Barry
Gaelic Park Players	Chicago, IL	The Castlecomer Jukebox	Jimmy Murphy
Irish Players of Rochester (Rochester Community Players)	Rochester, NY	Dublin Carol	Conor McPherson
The Irish American Theatre Company	Cincinnati, OH	What Happened Bridgie Cleary?	Conor McPherson
Tara Players	Winnipeg, MB	Midden	Morna Regan
Heads on Stage	Dublin, Ireland	Stolen Child	Yvonne Quinn/Bairbre Ni Chaoimh

=== 2011 Awards ===
Award	Actor	Role	Play	Company
Best Production			Dublin Carol	The Irish Players of Rochester
Lead Male	John Jaeger	John	Dublin Carol	The Irish Players of Rochester
Lead Female	Kaitlyn Groh	Bridgie Cleary	What Happened Bridgie Cleary?	The Irish American Theatre Company, Cincinnati
Supporting Male	Jamal Abdunnasir	Mark	Dublin Carol	The Irish Players of Rochester
Supporting Female	Anastasia O'Brien	Mabs	Midden	Tara Players, Winnipeg
Adjudicator's Award	The Cast	Ensemble Acting	Same Old Moon	Estuary Players, Dublin

== 2012 Festival; Dublin ==
The Axis-Ballymun Theatre in Dublin, Ireland, hosted the 2012 Festival from May 14–19, 2012.

=== 2012 Productions ===
Company	City	Production	Author
Heads on Stage	Dublin, Ireland	The Loves of Cass Maguire	Brian Friel
Milwaukee Irish Arts	Milwaukee, WI	White Woman Street	Sebastian Barry
Liffey Players Drama Society	Calgary, AB	Someone Who'll Watch Over Me	Frank McGuinness
Tara Players	Winnipeg, MB	The Muesli Belt	Jimmy Murphy
Irish American Theater Company	Cincinnati, OH	A Couple of Blaguards	Frank McCourt & Malachy McCourt
The Irish Players of Rochester	Rochester, NY	A Moon for the Misbegotten	Eugene O'Neill

=== 2012 Awards ===
Award	Actor	Role	Play	Company
Best Production			Someone Who'll Watch Over Me	Liffey Players Drama Society, Calgary
Lead Male	Bruce Mitchell	Adam	Someone Who'll Watch Over Me	Liffey Players Drama Society, Calgary
Lead Female	Stephanie Roosa	Josie	A Moon for the Misbegotten	The Irish Players of Rochester
Supporting Male	Fred Diggins	James Miranda	White Woman Street	Milwaukee Irish Arts
Supporting Female	Neasa McCann	Trilbe Costello	The Loves of Cass Maguire	Heads on Stage, Dublin
Adjudicator's Award	Bernard Farrelly	Spirit of the Festival Award		Gaelic Park Players, Chicago

== 2013 Festival; Chicago ==
The Festival was hosted by Chicago's Gaelic Park Players from May 21–25, 2013. The festival took place at Chicago's Gaelic Park, 6119 West 147th Street; Oak Forest, Illinois. The adjudicator for the festival was Brad Armacost. Attending the Awards Ceremony on May 26 was Aidan Cronin, Counsel General of Ireland, Chicago, Illinois.

=== 2013 Productions ===
(in order of presentation)

Company	City	Production	Author
The Gaelic Park Players	Chicago, IL	A Wake in the West	Michael Joe Ginnelly
Tara Players	Winnipeg, MB	Doubt: A Parable	John Patrick Shanley
Heads on Stage	Dublin, Ireland	Molly Sweeney	Brian Friel
The Irish Players of Rochester (Rochester Community Players)	Rochester, NY	Is Life Worth Living? (aka Drama at Inish)	Lennox Robinson
Irish American Theater Company	Cincinnati, OH	Dancing at Lughnasa	Brian Friel
Milwaukee Irish Arts	Milwaukee, WI	Eclipsed	Patricia Burke Brogan
Irish Theatre of Florida	South Florida	Here We Are Again Still	Christian O'Reilly
Liffey Players Drama Society	Calgary, AB	The Beauty Queen of Leenane	Martin McDonagh

=== 2013 Awards ===
Award	Actor	Role	Play	Company
Best Production			Eclipsed	Milwaukee Irish Arts
Lead Male	Jack Kirwan	Paddy	Here We Are Again Still	Irish Theatre of Florida
Lead Female	Sandy Lucas	Mag	The Beauty Queen of Leenane	Liffey Players Drama Society
Supporting Male	Greg Ludek	Hector	Is Life Worth Living?	The Irish Players of Rochester
Supporting Female	Kate McNally	Rose	A Wake in the West	The Gaelic Park Players
Adjudicator's Award			For Excellence in Performance, Hospitality and Professionalism	The Gaelic Park Players

Finalists for awards in 2013:

Best production: Doubt, a Parable; Eclipsed; Here We Are Again, Still; Beauty Queen of Leenane

Outstanding Performance by a Male Actor in a Leading Role: Robert Wall (Doubt, a Parable); Ken Moroney (Molly Sweeney); Robie Saxon (Molly Sweeney); Jack Kirwan (Here We Are Again, Still)

Outstanding Performance by a Female Actor in a Leading Role: Carol McQuarrie (Doubt, a Parable); Neasa McCann (Molly Sweeney); Imelda Wellington (Here We Are Again, Still); Sandy Lucas (Beauty Queen of Leenane)

Outstanding Performance by a Male Actor in a Supporting Role: Greg Ludek (Is Life Worth Living?); Mick McEvilley (Dancing at Lughnasa); Luke Hurt (Here We are Again, Still); Dorin McIntosh (Beauty Queen of Leenane)

Outstanding Performance by a Female Actor in a Supporting Role: Kate McNally (A Wake in the West); Kathy Dauer (Is Life Worth Living?); Megan Andres (Doubt, a Parable); The entire cast of Eclipsed

== 2014 Festival; Delray Beach, Florida ==
The Festival was hosted by the Irish Theatre of Florida from May 20–25, 2014. The festival took place at the Artns Garage, 180 NE 1st Street, Delray Beach. The adjudicator for the festival was John Countryman, Director of Theatre at Berry College in Georgia.

=== 2014 Productions ===
(in order of presentation)

Company	City	Production	Author
Irish Theatre of Florida	Delray Beach, FL	The Irish Dracula	James Doan
The Irish Players of Rochester (Rochester Community Players)	Rochester, NY	Shining City	Conor McPherson
Gaelic Park Players	Chicago IL	The Butterfly of Killybegs	Brian Foster
Heads on Stage	Dublin, Ireland	Brighton	Jim Nolan
Tara Players	Winnipeg, MB	The Housekeeper	Morna Regan
Liffey Players Drama Society	Calgary, AB	Stones in his Pocket	Marie Jones
Irish American Theater Company	Cincinnati, OH	Tho' It Were Ten Thousand Miles	William H. A. Williams
Milwaukee Irish Arts	Milwaukee, WI	These Halcyon Days	Dierdre Kinahan

=== 2014 Awards ===
Award	Actor	Role	Play	Company
Best Production			These Halcyon Days	Milwaukee Irish Arts
Lead Male	Eamonn O'Neill	Sean	These Halcyon Days	Milwaukee Irish Arts
Lead Female	Vera Kelly	Mary Conlon	The Butterfly of Killybegs	Gaelic Park Players
Supporting Male	Bill Alden	John	Shining City	The Irish Players of Rochester
Supporting Female	Annya Bright ()(Florida)	Mina Murray	The Irish Dracula	Irish Theatre of Florida
Adjudicator's Award			For Best New Play	Tho' It Were Ten Thousand Miles: A Love Story (Cincinnati)

Nominees for awards:

Best production: Shining City' (Rochester); These Halcyon Days (Milwaukee); 'Brighton (Dublin)

Outstanding Performance by a Male Actor in a Leading Role: Eamonn O'Neill (Sean) These Halcyon Days; Jerod Blake (Jake Quinn and other characters) Stones in his Pocket; Bernard Boland (Hal) The Housekeeper

Outstanding Performance by a Female Actor in a Leading Role: Neasa McCann (Lilly) Brighton; Joan End (Patricia) These Halcyon Days; Vera Kelly (Mary Conlon) The Butterfly of Killybegs

Outstanding Performance by a Male Actor in a Supporting Role: Cathal Moroney (Dave) Brighton; Bill Alden (John) Shining City; Toby Barton (Tadhg) The Irish Dracula

Outstanding Performance by a Female Actor in a Supporting Role: Cecilia Walsh (Lucilla Desmond) The Irish Dracula; Annya Bright (Mina Murray) The Irish Dracula; Carol McQuarrie (Beth) The House Keeper

== 2015 Festival; Cincinnati, Ohio ==
The Festival was hosted by the Irish American Theater Company from May 19–24, 2015. The festival took place at the Irish Heritage Center, 3905 Eastern Avenue, Cincinnati, . The adjudicator for the festival was George Heslin, Artistic Director of Origin Theatre Company, NY.

=== 2015 Productions ===
(in order of presentation)

Company	City	Production	Author
Irish American Theater Company	Cincinnati, Ohio	The Calvacaders	Billy Roche
The Irish Players of Rochester (Rochester Community Players)	Rochester, NY	"The Field"	John B. Keane
Gaelic Park Players	Chicago IL	The Maiden Aunt	Jimmy Keary
Tara Players	Winnipeg, MB	The New Electric Ballroom	Enda Walsh
Liffey Players Drama Society	Calgary, AB	Sea Marks	Gardner McKay
Irish Theatre of Florida	Delray Beach, FL	The Chastitute	John B. Keane
Milwaukee Irish Arts	Milwaukee, WI	Moment	Dierdre Kinahan

=== 2015 Awards ===
Award	Actor	Role	Play	Company
Best Production			The New Electric Ballroom	Winnipeg Tara Players
Lead Male				
Lead Female	Lindsey Gagliano	Niamh Lynch	Moment	Milwaukee Irish Arts
Supporting Male	Nate Press	Nial Lynch	Moment	Milwaukee Irish Arts
Supporting Female				
Adjudicator's Award				

Nominees for awards:

== 2016 Festival; Milwaukee ==
The Festival was hosted by Milwaukee Irish Arts from May 24–28, 2016. The festival took place at Next Act Theatre, 255 S Water Street, Milwaukee, WI. The adjudicators for the festival were .

=== 2016 Productions ===
(in order of presentation)

Company	City	Production	Author
Milwaukee Irish Arts	Milwaukee, WI	The Plough and the Stars	Sean O'Casey
Magpie Theatre Company (Guest Performers)	Chicago, IL	The Cheek	Jim Lynch
Liffey Players Drama Society	Calgary, AB	Eden	Eugene O'Brien
Heads on Stage	Dublin, Ireland	Chapatti	Christian O'Reilly
Gaelic Park Players	Chicago, IL	Shadow of a Gunman	Sean O'Casey
Irish Players of Rochester	Rochester, NY	The Seafarer	Conor McPherson
Irish Theatre of Florida	Delray Beach, FL	Fooked	Gillian Grattan
Irish American Theatre Company	Cincinnati, OH	The Weir	Conor McPherson
Tara Players	Winnipeg, MB	The Last Days of Cleopatra	Laoisa Sexton

=== 2016 Awards ===
Award	Actor	Role	Play	Company
Best Production			Eden	Liffey Players Drama Society
Lead Male	Jerod Blake	Billy	Eden	Liffey Players Drama Society
Lead Female	Peggy Hamilton	Natalie	The Last Days of Cleopatra	Tara Players
Supporting Male	Mark John Donahue	Mr Lockhart	The Seafarer	The Irish Players of Rochester
Supporting Female	Marssie Mencotti		The Cheek	Magpie Theatre Company
Adjudicator's Award			For generating the greatest jolt of audience energy in the room	The Irish Players of Rochester

Finalists for awards in 2016:

Best production: Eden; The Seafarer; The Last Days of Cleopatra

Outstanding Performance by a Male Actor in a Leading Role: Jerod Blake (Eden); Denis Holmes (Hooked); Quinn Greene (Last Days of Cleopatra)

Outstanding Performance by a Female Actor in a Leading Role: Katelyn Morishita (Eden); Neasa McCann (Chapatti); Peggy Hamilton (Last Days of Cleopatra)

Outstanding Performance by a Male Actor in a Supporting Role: Dylan Bolan (The Plough and the Stars); Mark John Donahue (The Seafarer); Mick McEvilley (The Weir)

Outstanding Performance by a Female Actor in a Supporting Role: Liz Shipe (The Plough and the Stars); Marssie Mencotti (The Cheek); Bridget Christianson (Shadow of a Gunman)
