= List of Irish dramatists =

This is a list of playwrights either born in Ireland or holding Irish citizenship. Playwrights whose work is in Irish are included.

A brief outline of the history of Irish theatre is also available.

== A – J ==
- Geraldine Aron (born 1951)
- John Banim (1798–1842)
- Sebastian Barry (born 1955)
- Samuel Beckett (1906–1989)
- Brendan Behan (1923–1964)
- Dermot Bolger (born 1959)
- Dion Boucicault (1820–1890)
- Patricia Burke Brogan (1932-2022)
- Colm Byrne (born 1966)
- Marina Carr (born 1964)
- Paul Vincent Carroll (1900–1968)
- Anne-Marie Casey (born 1965)
- Austin Clarke (1896–1974)
- Olivia Owenson, Lady Clarke (1785–1845
- Padraic Colum (1881–1972)
- William Congreve (1670–1729)
- Máirín Cregan (1891–1975)
- Geraldine Cummins (1890–1969)
- Suzanne R. Day (1876–1964)
- Hamilton Deane (1879 –1958)
- Anne Devlin (born 1951)
- Roddy Doyle (born 1958)
- Gary Duggan (born 1979)
- Lord Dunsany (1878–1957)
- St John Ervine (1883–1971)
- Padraic Fallon (1905–1974)
- George Farquhar (1677–1707)
- Bernard Farrell (born 1941)
- Seamus Finnegan (born 1949)
- George Fitzmaurice (1877–1963)
- Gerard Mannix Flynn (born 1957)
- Brian Friel (1929–2015)
- Miriam Gallagher (born 1940)
- Ewen Glass (born 1982)
- Oliver Goldsmith (1728–1774)
- Lady Augusta Gregory (1852–1932)
- Gerald Griffin (1803–1840)
- Michael Harding (born 1953)
- Declan Hughes (born 1963)
- Denis Johnston (1901–1984)
- Jennifer Johnston (1930–2025)
- Henry Jones (1721–1770)
- Marie Jones (born 1951)
- Lauren-Shannon Jones (born c. 1989)
- James Joyce (1882–1941)

== K – Z ==
- Patrick Kavanagh (1904–1967)
- John B. Keane (1928–2002)
- Thomas Kilroy (1934–2023)
- Deirdre Kinahan (born 1968)
- Hugh Leonard (1926–2009)
- Brian Lynch (born 1945)
- Máiréad Ní Ghráda (1896-1971)
- Walter Macken (1915–1967)
- Micheál MacLiammoir (1899–1978)
- Mary Manning (1905–1999)
- Edward Martyn (1859–1923)
- Charles Macklin (1699-1797)
- Martin McDonagh (born 1970)
- Frank McGuinness (born 1953)
- Conor McPherson (born 1971)
- Paul McSwiney (1856–1890)
- Honor Molloy (born 1961)
- M. J. Molloy (1914–1994)
- George Moore (1852–1933)
- Jimmy Murphy (born 1962)
- John Murphy (1924–1998)
- Tom Murphy (1935-2018)
- T. C. Murray (1873–1959)
- Janet McNeill (1907–1994)
- Áine Ní Ghlinn (born 1955)
- Seán O'Casey (1880–1964)
- Joseph O'Connor (born 1963)
- Mary Devenport O'Neill (1879–1967)
- Sean O'Rourke (born 1955)
- Mark O'Rowe (born 1970)
- Cathal Ó Searcaigh (born 1956)
- Stewart Parker (1941–1988)
- Lennox Robinson (1886–1958)
- Billy Roche (born 1949)
- G. Bernard Shaw (1856–1950)
- Peter Sheridan (born 1952)
- Richard Brinsley Sheridan (1751–1816)
- George Shiels (1881–1949)
- John Millington Synge (1871–1909)
- Colin Teevan (born 1968)
- Colm Tóibín (born 1955)
- Joseph Tomelty (1911–1995)
- Mervyn Wall (1908–1997)
- Enda Walsh (born 1967)
- Oscar Wilde (1854–1900)
- W. B. Yeats (1865–1939)

== See also ==
- Irish theatre
- Irish literature
- List of Irish dramatists
- List of Irish poets
- List of Irish novelists
- List of Irish short story writers
