= Irish theatre =

Theatre of Ireland

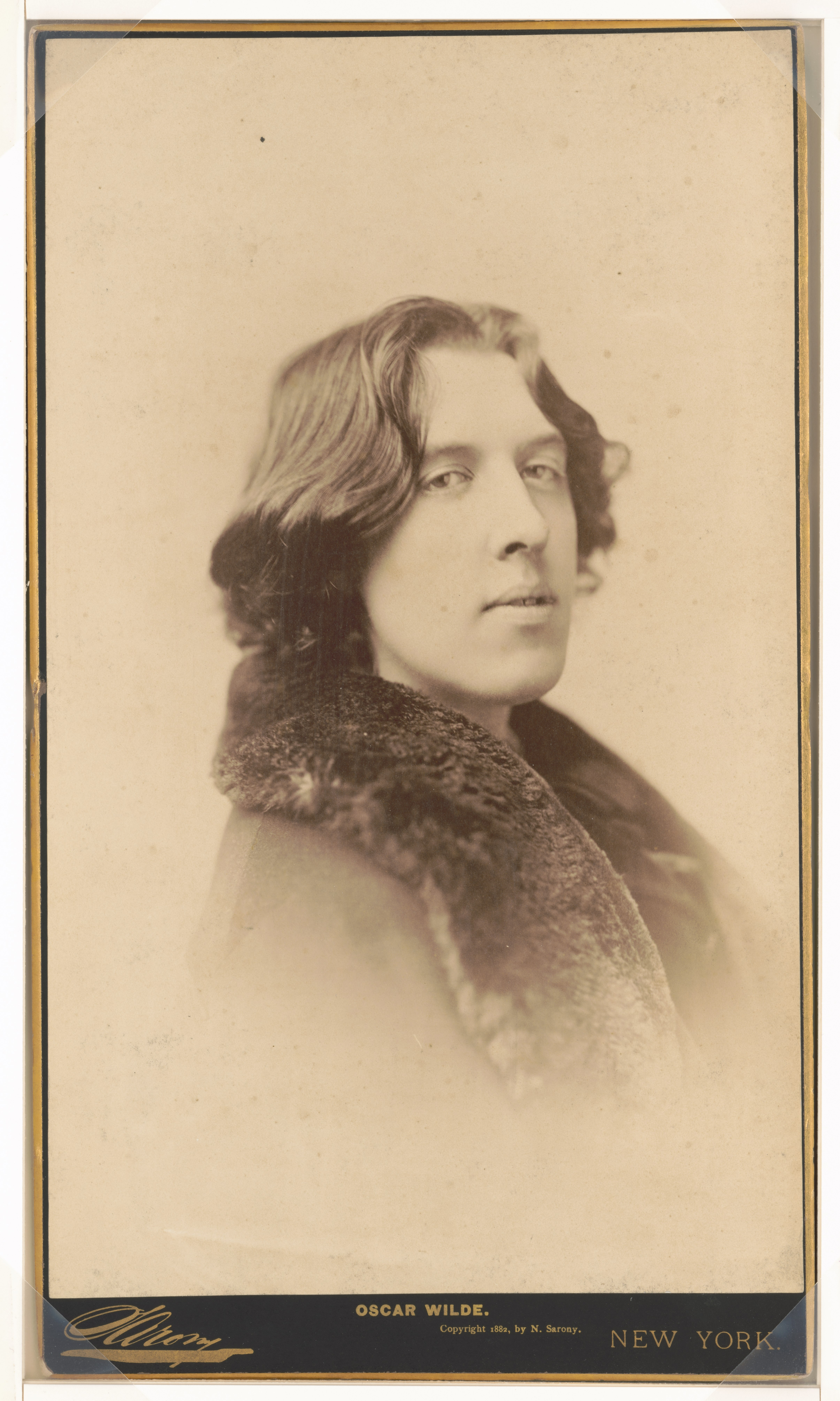
Oscar Wilde remains one of Ireland's best-known playwrights.

The history of Irish theatre begins in the Middle Ages and was for a long time confined to the courts of the Gaelic and "Old English" – descendants of 12th-century Norman invaders – inhabitants of Ireland. The first theatre building in Ireland was the Werburgh Street Theatre, founded in 1637, followed by the Smock Alley Theatre in 1662 which held performances 1787.

From the 17th century, theatrical productions in Ireland tended to serve the political purposes of the English colonial administration, but as more theatres opened and the popular audience grew, a more diverse range of entertainments were staged. Many Dublin-based theatres developed links with their London equivalents and performers and productions from the British capital frequently found their way to the Irish stage. However, almost all Irish playwrights from William Congreve to George Bernard Shaw found it necessary to leave their native island to establish themselves.

At the beginning of the 20th century, theatres and theatre companies dedicated to the staging of Irish plays and the development of indigenous writers, directors and performers began to emerge. This allowed many of the most significant Irish dramatists to learn their trade and establish their reputations in Ireland rather than in the United Kingdom or the United States.

== Historic theatre buildings ==
Few historic theatre buildings survive in Ireland, and only a small minority predate the 20th century. The Gaiety Theatre in Dublin dates to 1871, and despite multiple alterations it retains several Victorian era features and remains Ireland's longest-established, continuously producing public theatre. The Theatre Royal, Waterford dates to 1876, but retains some structural material from the 1785 theatre building which preceded it, and is considered Ireland's oldest continually operating theatre. The Smock Alley Theatre was converted, in 2012, from an early 19th century church building which incorporated fabric from the 18th century theatre which preceded it, and is built on the foundations of the first Theatre Royal from 1662. It is thus often referred to as Ireland's "oldest new theatre" or "newest old theatre". The Lord Amiens Theatre was built as a private theatre wing of Aldborough House in 1795, and used as such until 1830. Despite alterations to the interior, structurally the building remains exactly as it was designed and first constructed, and it is thus considered the oldest purpose-built theatre building in Ireland.

== Small beginnings ==
Although there would appear to have been performances of plays on religious themes in Ireland from as early as the 14th century, the first well-documented instance of a theatrical production in Ireland is a 1601 staging of Gorboduc presented by Lord Mountjoy Lord Deputy of Ireland in the Great Hall in Dublin Castle. The play had been written by Thomas Sackville and Thomas Norton for the 1561/2 Christmas festivities at the Inner Temple in London and appears to have been selected because it was a story of a divided kingdom descending into anarchy that was applicable to the situation in Ireland at the time of the performance. Mountjoy started a fashion, and private performances became quite commonplace in great houses all over Ireland over the following thirty years.

The Werburgh Street Theatre in Dublin is generally identified as the "first custom-built theatre in the city," "the only pre-Restoration playhouse outside London," and the "first Irish playhouse."

== Court in Kilkenny ==
In 1642, as a result of the English Civil War, Dublin Royalists were forced to flee the city. Many of them went to Kilkenny to join a confederacy of Old English and Irish that formed in that city. Kilkenny had a tradition of dramatic performance going back to 1366, and the Dublin company, much attenuated, set up in their new home. At least one new play was published in Kilkenny; A Tragedy of Cola's Fury, OR, Lirenda's Misery, a blatantly political work with the Lirenda of the title being an anagram of Ireland.

With the restoration of the monarchy in 1661, John Ogilby was commissioned to design the triumphal arches and write masques for the new king's entrance into London. Ogilby was reinstated as Master of the Revels and returned to Dublin to open a new theatre in Smock Alley. Although starting well, this new theatre was essentially under the control of the administration in Dublin Castle and staged mainly pro-Stuart works and Shakespearean classics. As a result, Irish playwrights and actors of real talent were drawn to London.

== The Restoration ==
An early example of this trend is William Congreve, one of the most important writers for the late 18th London stage. Although born in Yorkshire, Congreve grew up in Ireland and studied with Jonathan Swift in Kilkenny and at Trinity College Dublin. After graduating, Congreve moved to London to study law at the Temple and pursue a literary career. His first play, The Old Bachelor (1693) was sponsored by John Dryden, and he went on to write at least four more plays. The last of these, The Way of the World (1700) is the one Congreve work regularly revived on the modern stage. However, at the time of its creation, it was a relative failure and he wrote no further works for the theatre.

With the accession to the throne of William of Orange, the whole ethos of Dublin Castle, including its attitude to the theatre, changed. A theatre at Smock Alley stayed in existence until the 1780s and new theatres, such as the Theatre Royal, Queens' Theatre, and The Gaiety Theatre opened during the 19th century. However, the one constant for the next 200 years was that the main action in the history of Irish theatre happened outside Ireland itself, mainly in London.

== 18th century ==
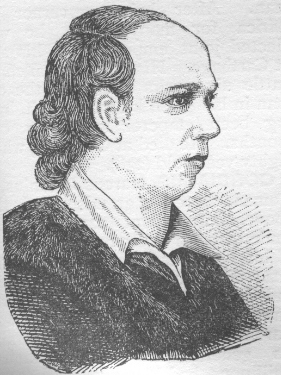
Oliver Goldsmith

The 18th century saw the emergence of two major Irish dramatists, Oliver Goldsmith and Richard Brinsley Sheridan, who were two of the most successful playwrights on the London stage in the 18th century. Goldsmith (1728–1774) was born in Roscommon and grew up in extremely rural surroundings. He entered Trinity College in 1745 and graduated in 1749. He returned to the family home, and in 1751, began to travel, finally settling in London in 1756, where he published poetry, prose and two plays, The Good-Natur'd Man 1768 and She Stoops to Conquer 1773. This latter was a huge success and is still regularly revived.

Sheridan (1751–1816) was born in Dublin into a family with a strong literary and theatrical tradition. His mother was a writer and his father was manager of Smock Alley Theatre. The family moved to England in the 1750s, and Sheridan attended Harrow Public School. His first play, The Rivals 1775, was performed at Covent Garden and was an instant success. He went on to become the most significant London playwright of the late 18th century with plays like The School for Scandal and The Critic. He was owner of the Drury Lane Theatre, which he bought from David Garrick. The theatre burned down in 1809, and Sheridan lived out the rest of his life in reduced circumstances. He is buried in Poets' Corner at Westminster Abbey.

== 19th century ==
After Sheridan, the next Irish dramatist of historical importance was Dion Boucicault (1820–1890). Boucicault was born in Dublin but went to England to complete his education. At school, he began writing dramatic sketches and soon took up acting under the stage name of Lee Morton. His first play was Legend of Devil's Dyke 1838 in which he acted himself in Brighton. His first London production was London Assurance 1841. This was a great success and he seemed set to become the major writer of comedies of his day. However, his next few plays were not as successful and Boucicault found himself in debt. He recovered some of his reputation with The Corsican Brothers (1852), a well constructed melodrama.

In 1853, he moved to New York, where he soon became a hit with plays like The Poor of New York (1857), Dot (1859, based on Charles Dickens's The Cricket on the Hearth) and The Octoroon (1859). These plays tackled issues such as urban poverty and slavery. Boucicault was also involved in getting the 1856 law on copyright passed through Congress. His last New York play was The Colleen Bawn (1860). In that year, Boucicault returned to London to stage The Colleen Bawn and the play ran for 247 performances at The Adelphi Theatre. He wrote several more successful plays, including The Shaughran (1875) and Robert Emmet (1884). These later plays helped perpetuate the stereotype of the drunken, hotheaded, garrulous Irishman that had been common on the British stage since the time of Shakespeare. Other Irish dramatists of the period include John Banim and Gerald Griffin, whose novel The Collegians formed the basis for The Colleen Bawn.

Boucicault is widely regarded as the wittiest Irish dramatist between Sheridan and Oscar Wilde (1854–1900). Wilde was born in Dublin into a literary family and studied at Trinity College, where he had a brilliant career. In 1874 he won a scholarship to Magdalen College, Oxford. Here he began his career as a writer, winning the Newdigate Prize for his poem Ravenna. His studies were cut short during his second year at Oxford when his father died leaving large debts.

During a short but glittering literary career, Wilde wrote poetry, short stories, criticism and a novel, but his plays probably represent his most enduring legacy. Wilde's first stage success came with Lady Windermere's Fan (1892), which resulted in his becoming the most talked about dramatist in London. He followed this up with A Woman of No Importance (1893), An Ideal Husband (1895) and his most famous play The Importance of Being Earnest that same year.

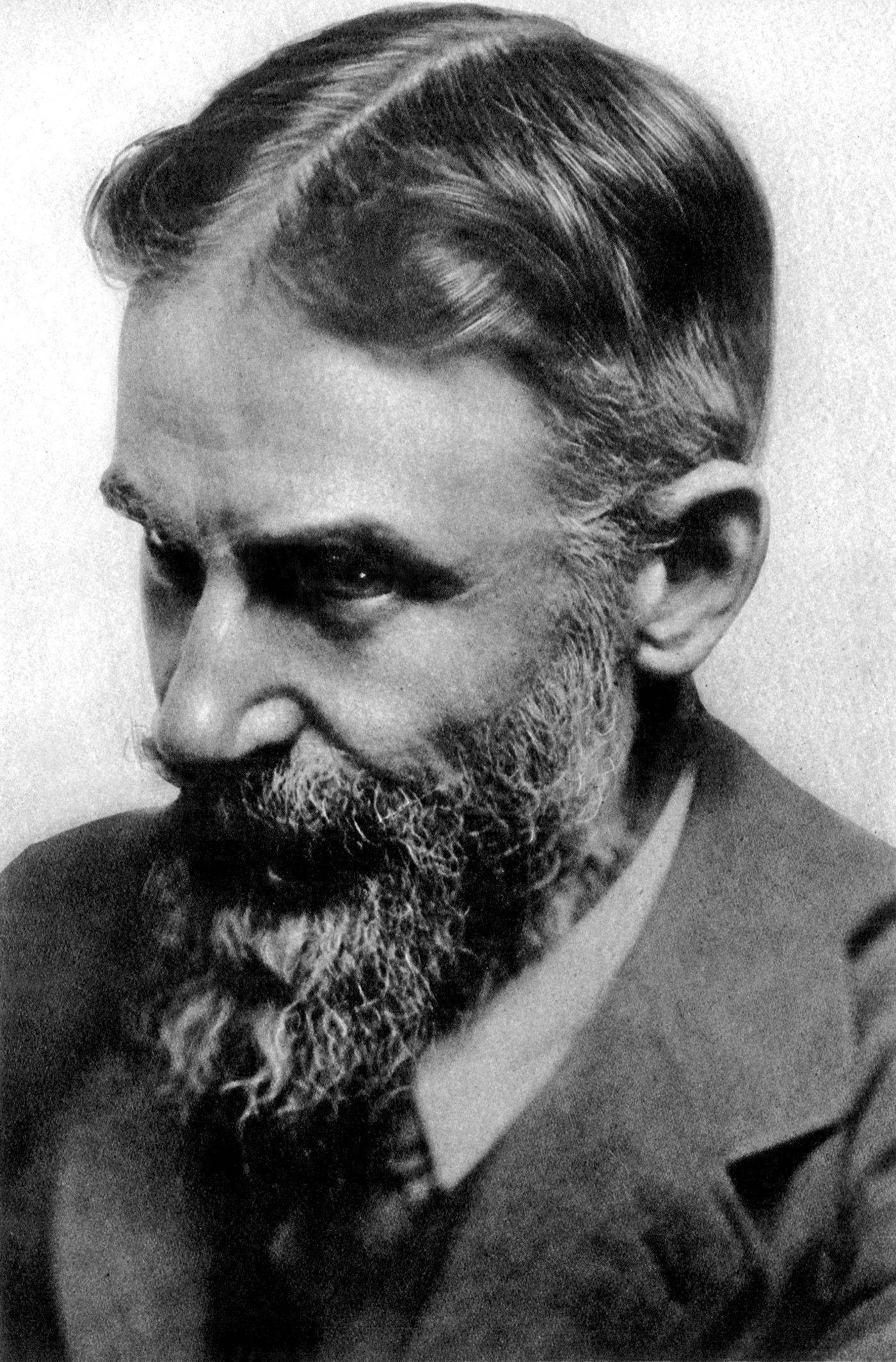
George Bernard Shaw

With these plays, Wilde came to dominate late-Victorian era British theatre. His plays are noted for the lightness of their wit, but he also contrived to address some serious issues around sexual and class roles and identity, as he wrote himself 'treating the serious things lightly and the light things seriously'. Events in Wilde's personal life were to overtake his literary success and he died in Paris in 1900. He remains one of the great figures in the history of Irish theatre and his plays are frequently performed all over the English-speaking world.

Wilde's contemporary George Bernard Shaw (1856–1950) was a very different kind of writer. Born in Dublin, Shaw moved to London in 1876 intending to become a novelist. Here he became active in socialist politics and became a member of the Fabian Society. He was also a very public vegetarian. His writing for the stage was influenced by Henrik Ibsen. His early political plays were not popular, but he made a breakthrough with John Bull's Other Island (1904). Shaw was extremely prolific, and his collected writings filled 36 volumes. Many of his plays are now forgotten, but a number, including Major Barbara, Saint Joan (usually considered his masterpiece) and Pygmalion are still regularly performed. Pygmalion was the basis for the movie My Fair Lady, a fact which benefitted the National Gallery of Ireland as Shaw had left the royalties of the play to the gallery. A statue of the playwright now stands outside the gallery entrance. He won the Nobel Prize for Literature in 1925.

== 20th and 21st centuries ==
=== The Abbey and after ===
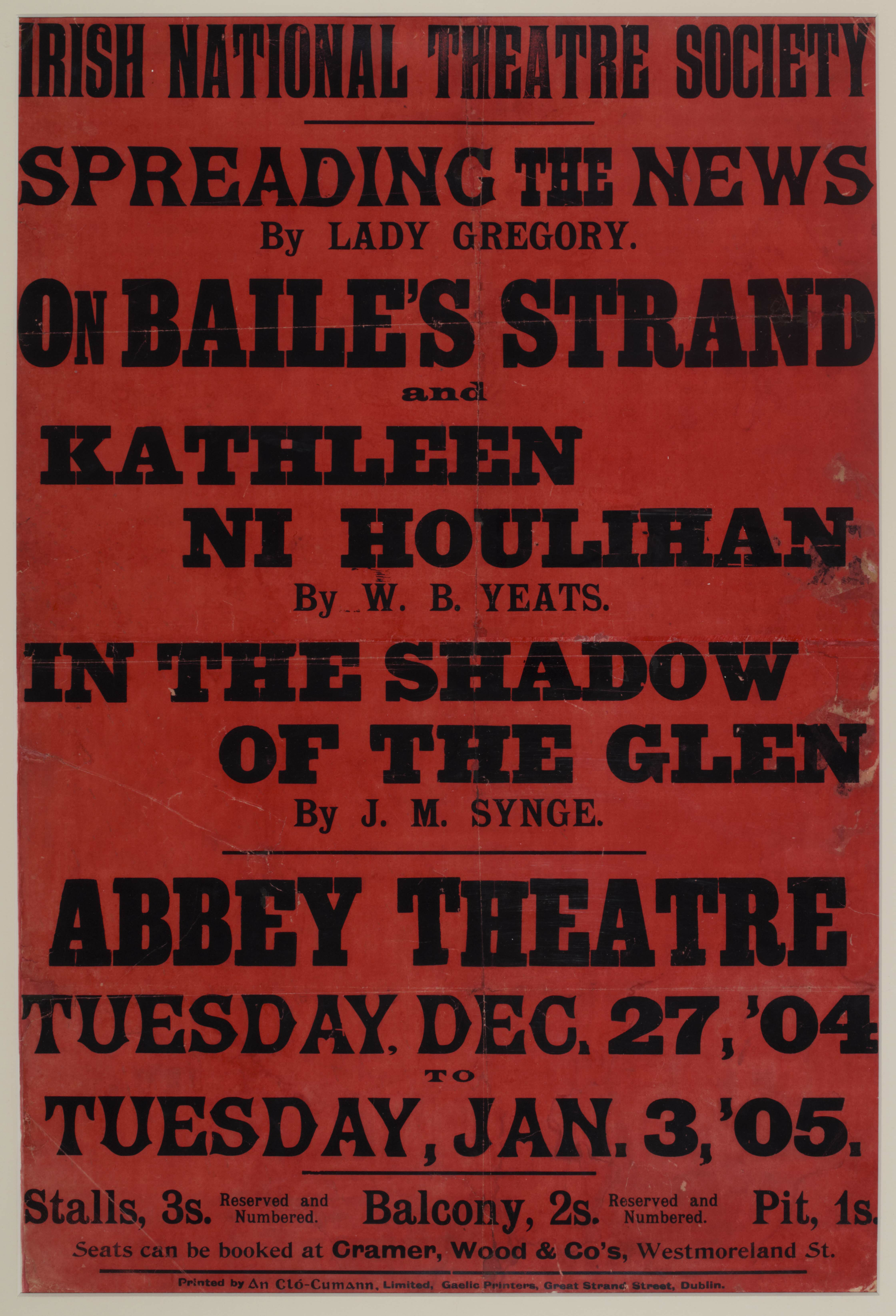
A poster for the opening run at the Abbey Theatre from 27 December 1904 to 3 January 1905

A sea change in the history of the Irish theatre came with the establishment in Dublin in 1899 of the Irish Literary Theatre by W. B. Yeats, Lady Gregory, George Moore and Edward Martyn. This was followed by the Irish National Theatre Society, later to become the Abbey Theatre. The history of this theatre is well documented, and its importance can be seen from the list of writers whose plays were first performed here in the early days of the 20th century. These included W. B. Yeats, Lady Gregory, John Millington Synge, George Moore, and Seán O'Casey. Equally importantly, through the introduction by Yeats, via Ezra Pound, of elements of the Noh theatre of Japan, a tendency to mythologise quotidian situations, and a particularly strong focus on writings in dialects of Hiberno-English, the Abbey was to create a style that held a strong fascination for future Irish dramatists. Indeed, it could almost be said that the Abbey created the basic elements of a national theatrical style.

This period also saw a rise in the writing of plays in Irish, especially after the formation, in 1928, of An Taidhbhearc, a theatre dedicated to the Irish language. The Gate Theatre, also founded in 1928 under the direction of Hilton Edwards and Micheál MacLiammóir, introduced Irish audiences to many of the classics of the European stage.

=== Mid-20th century ===
The twentieth century saw a number of Irish playwrights come to prominence. Samuel Beckett is probably the most significant of these. Beckett had a long career as a novelist and poet before his first play, Waiting for Godot (1953) made him famous. This play, along with his second, Endgame, is one of the great works of absurdist theatre. Beckett was awarded for the Nobel Prize in Literature in 1969.

The Lyric Theatre, founded in 1944 by Austin Clarke was based in the Abbey until 1951 and produced many of Clarke's own verse plays. From the mid-1950s, the Unitarian Church at St Stephen's Green, Dublin was home to Amharclann an Damer/The Damer Theatre. The Damer produced both professional and amateur Irish language theatre. The world premier of Brendan Behan's An Giall (The Hostage) took place here in 1958. The theatre closed in 1981. Behan went on to be an extremely popular dramatist, particularly through his work with Joan Littlewood's Theatre Royal in Stratford, East London.

Other important Irish dramatists of this period include: Denis Johnston, Thomas Kilroy, Tom Murphy, Hugh Leonard, Frank McGuinness, and John B. Keane.

=== Recent developments ===
In general, the Abbey was the dominant influence in theatre in Ireland across the 20th century. Beckett's example has been almost entirely ignored, although his plays are regularly performed on the Irish stage. Behan, in his use of song and direct address to the audience, was influenced by Bertolt Brecht and Denis Johnston used modernist techniques including found texts and collage, but their works had little impact on the dramatists who came after them. In the 1970s and 1980s, a number of companies emerged to challenge the Abbey's dominance and introduce different styles and approaches. These included Focus Theatre, The Passion Machine, The Children's T Company, the Project Theatre Company, Red Kettle, Druid Theatre, TEAM and Field Day. These companies nurtured a number of writers, actors, and directors who went on to be successful in London, Broadway and Hollywood or in other literary fields. These include Enda Walsh, Joe O Byrne, Peter Sheridan, Brian Friel, Stephen Rea, Garry Hynes, Martin McDonagh, Conor McPherson, Marina Carr, Jimmy Murphy, Billy Roche and Gabriel Byrne. In 1974 Siamsa Tíre, the National Folk Theatre of Ireland, was founded in Tralee, County Kerry, by Pat Ahern.

In the 1990s and 2000s a new wave of theatre companies arrived. These include: Barabbas, Barnstorm Theatre Company, Bedrock, Blue Raincoat, B*spoke, The Corn Exchange, Corcadorca, Fishamble, KATS Theatre Group, Loose Canon, Ouroborous and Pan Pan. A number of these companies had a significant portion or, in some cases, all of their Arts Council funding cut at the beginning of 2010 and it remains to be seen if they will continue to operate.

== Theatre in the Irish language ==
Irish language theatre has enjoyed periods of remarkable productivity since its beginnings in the era of the Gaelic Revival, despite a frequent lack of trained actors and directors, a small and scattered audience and difficulty in finding permanent theatre spaces.

The earliest plays were often based on folk themes or had as their aim the strengthening of nationalism. It was not until the late nineteen twenties that a real sophistication began to be achieved, and even then the work depended largely on the work of gifted amateurs working through dramatic societies and the few available theatres. They were handicapped by the lack of a longstanding dramatic tradition such as existed in English, and it has been argued that, with outstanding exceptions, there was little influence at the time from the European classics.

From 1942 the Abbey Theatre began occasional productions in Irish; in time this led to a concentration on pantomime at the expense of longer and more serious work. New theatre companies emerged to redress this, and An Phéacóg Nua (The New Peacock Theatre), a small theatre specialising in Irish-language drama, was created as an extension of the Abbey. The task of presenting innovative theatre in Irish was taken up by An Damer, a theatre in the heart of Dublin. It continued the tradition of staging both original work and translations. There were professional directors working there, and the playwrights included Eoghan Ó Tuairisc, Seán Ó Tuama, Brendan Behan and Máiréad Ní Ghráda. It served as a training ground for actors like Niall Tóibín who achieved distinction elsewhere. It lost its state subsidy in 1981 and closed, and the new theatre companies that arose to replace it lacked a permanent home.

The Taibhdhearc, a Galway theatre founded in 1928, was explicitly devoted to Irish-language productions. Prominent among those involved were the writer and actor Micheál MacLiammóir and his companion Hilton Edwards, who were also involved with the Gate Theatre in Dublin. The Taibhdhearc has over the years mounted critically praised productions, but there was always tension between proponents of original and translated drama. There was a constant need for new scripts and for sufficient funding to establish the Taibhdhearc as a national theatre. The number of full-length plays in Irish being presented there is presently at a minimum.

Irish-language theatre still depends upon a mixture of amateur and professional talent. Current companies include Aisteoirí Bulfin, Fíbín (with an emphasis on physicality and the visual, including masks and puppetry) and the Belfast group Aisling Ghéar, with an interest in experimentation. Dublin, traditionally a theatrical centre, still lacks a permanent theatre devoted solely to Irish-language productions, though the Peacock Theatre continues to present plays in Irish. In the words of Irish theatre historian Philip O’Leary, "theatre in Irish has been a living if often invisible art form, with its companies, venues, prizes and, of course, critics". In spite of its problems, it shows continuing vitality.

== See also ==
- The Irish Times Irish Theatre Awards
- Irish literature
- List of Irish dramatists
- List of Irish theatres and theatre companies

== Bibliography ==
- Peter Kavanagh: Irish Theatre (Tralee: The Kerryman, 1946).
- James Moran: Staging the Easter Rising: 1916 as Theatre
- R. Pine: The Dublin Gate Theatre 1928-1978 (Cambridge: Chadwyck-Healey, 1984)
- R. Pine: Brian Friel and Ireland’s Drama (London: Routledge, 1990)
- R. Pine: The Diviner: the Art of Brian Friel (Dublin: University College Dublin Press, 1999)
- Anthony Roche: Contemporary Irish Drama—from Beckett to McGuinness
- Alan J. Fletcher: Drama, Performance, and Polity in Pre-Cromwellian Ireland (Toronto: Toronto University Press & Cork: Cork University Press, 2000)
- A. J. Fletcher: Drama and the Performing Arts in Pre-Cromwellian Ireland. Sources and Documents from the Earliest Times Until c.1642 (Cambridge: D. S. Brewer, 2001).
- Christopher Morash: A History of Irish Theatre, 1601–2000 (Cambridge: Cambridge University Press, 2002).
