= Coffin ship =

Ships that carried Irish and Scottish migrants during the 19th century

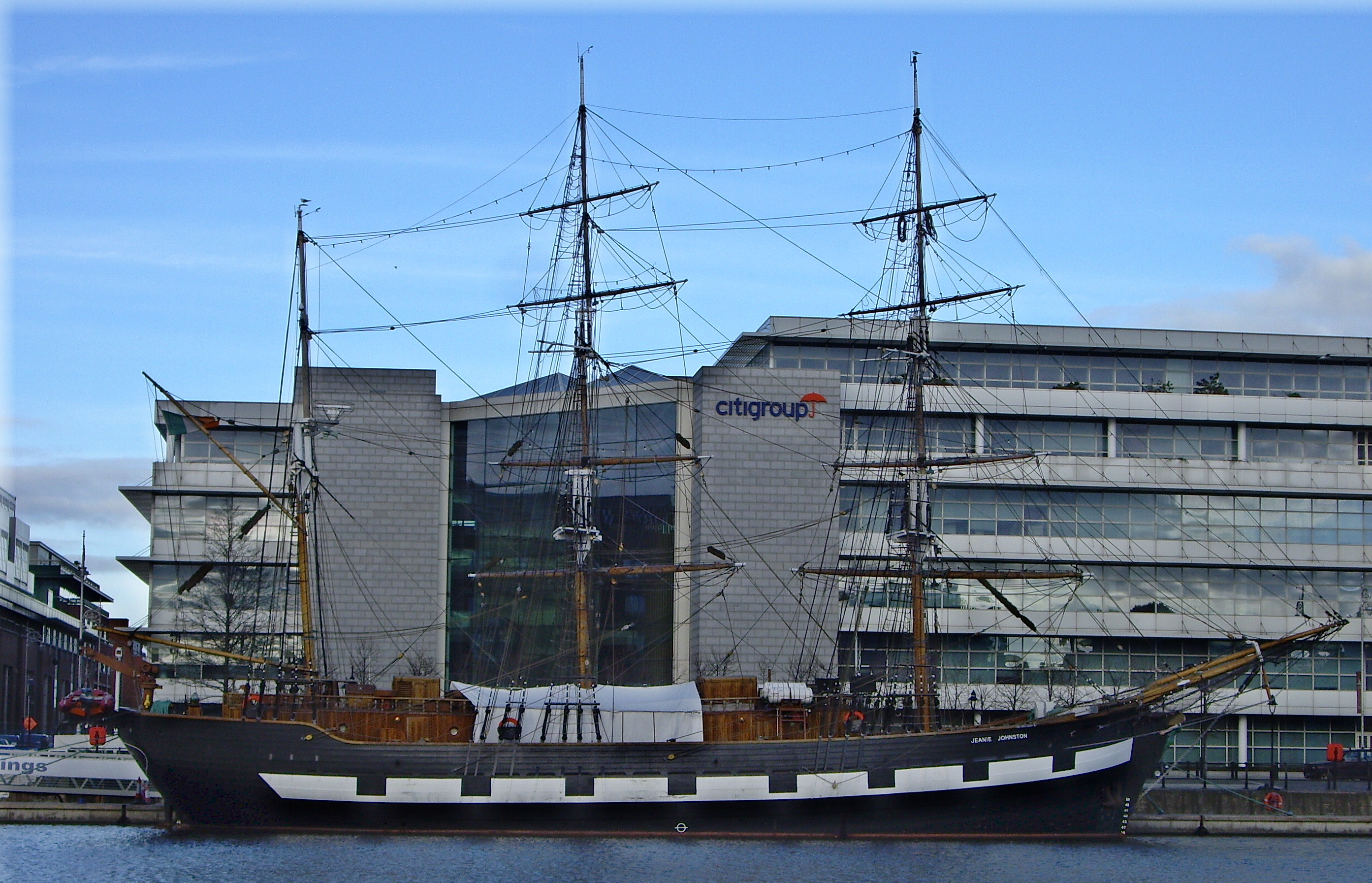
Replica of the "good ship" Jeanie Johnston, which sailed during the Great Hunger when coffin ships were common. No one ever died on the Jeanie Johnston due to good practices by the captain and ship's doctor compared to the norms of the period.

A coffin ship (Irish: long cónra) is an idiom used to describe the ships that carried Irish migrants escaping the Great Irish Famine and Highlanders displaced by the Highland Clearances.

Coffin ships carrying emigrants, crowded and disease-ridden, with poor access to food and water, resulted in the deaths of many people as they crossed the Atlantic, and led to the 1847 North American typhus epidemic at quarantine stations in Canada. Owners of coffin ships provided as little food, water, and living space as was legally possible, if they obeyed the law at all. With death rates commonly reaching 20 percent and horror stories of 50 percent dying, these vessels soon became known as coffin ships. Those who died were buried at sea.

While coffin ships were the cheapest way to cross the Atlantic, mortality rates of 30 percent aboard the coffin ships were common. It was said that sharks could be seen following the ships, because so many bodies were thrown overboard.

== Legislation ==
Legislation to protect emigrant passengers, the Passenger Vessels Act 1803 (43 Geo. 3. c. 56), was enacted in Britain and continued to evolve in the following decades. A revised act, the Passengers in Merchant Vessels Act 1828 (9 Geo. 4. c. 21), for example, marked the first time that the British government took an active interest in emigration matters. Within a few years, regulations were in force to determine the maximum number of passengers that a ship could carry, and to ensure that sufficient food and water be provided for the voyage.

But, the legislation was not always enforced, so unscrupulous shipowners and shipmasters found ways to circumvent the law. In addition, ships sailing from non-British ports were not subject to the legislation. As a consequence, thousands of emigrants experienced a miserable and often dangerous journey. By 1867, regulations were more effective, thus providing people with the promise of a safe, if not comfortable, voyage.

== Memorials ==
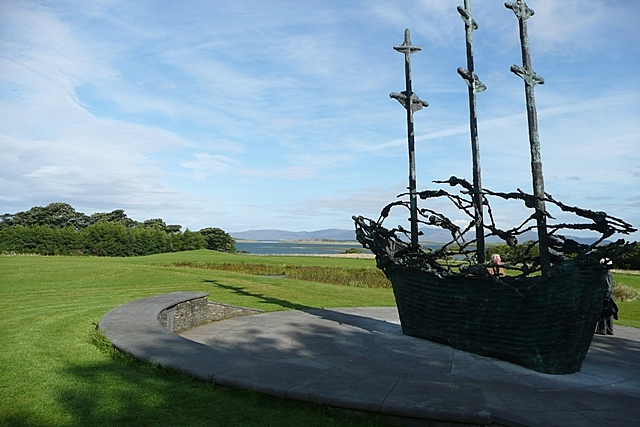
Famine national monument at Murrisk

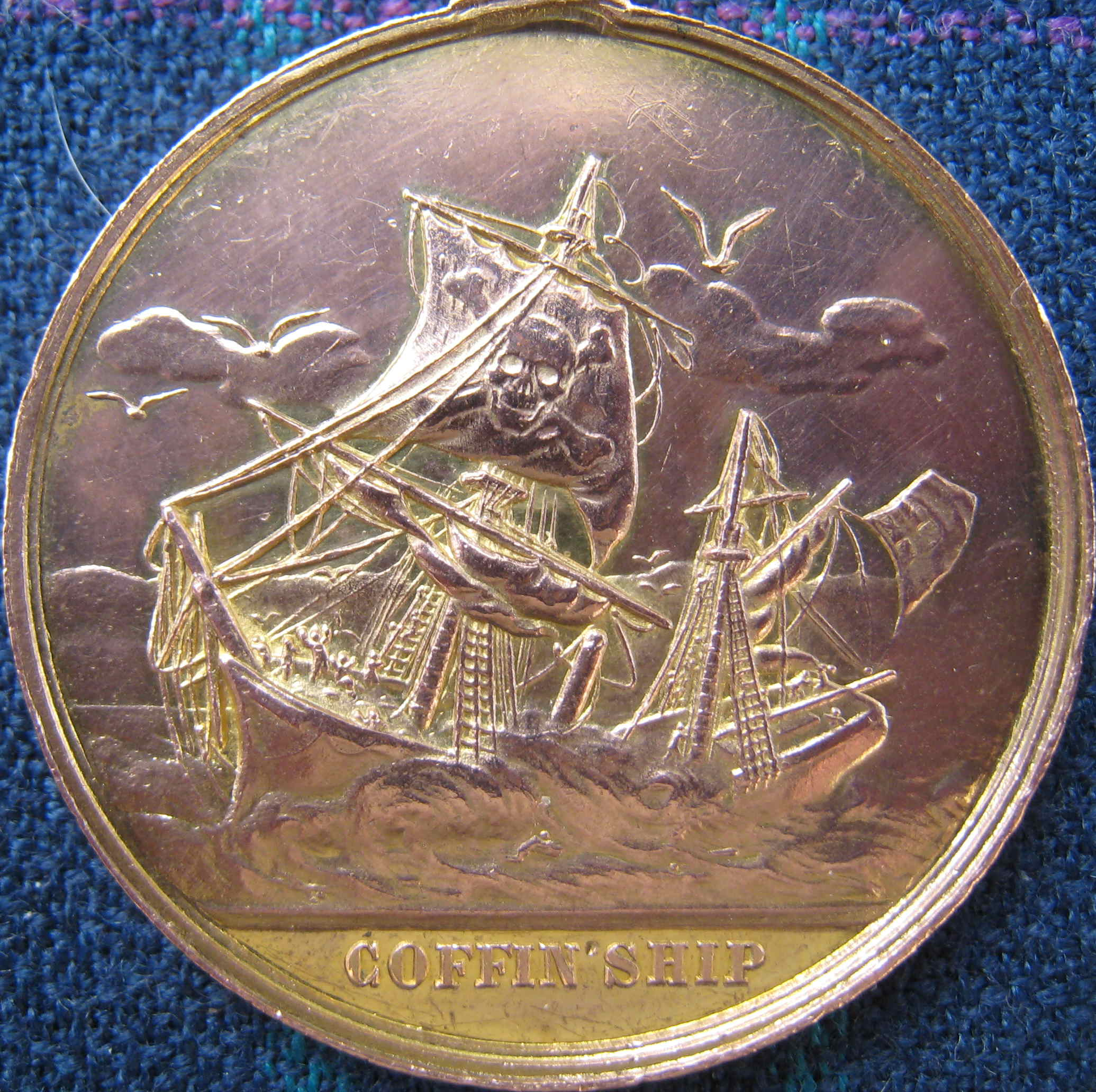
The obverse side of a medal given to Samuel Plimsoll showing a coffin ship

The National Famine Monument at the base of Croagh Patrick in Murrisk, County Mayo, Ireland depicts a coffin ship with skeletons and bones as rigging. Sculpted by John Behan, it is Ireland's largest bronze sculpture. The "Coffin Ship" was unveiled by then President of Ireland Mary Robinson in 1997 to mark the 150th anniversary of the Irish Famine.

== In popular culture ==
The term "coffin ships" was practically never used during the Great Famine itself (1845–1852). It appeared in Irish newspapers only once in a while in the years before and during the catastrophe, but it was not popularized until the early 1870s, when English Member of Parliament Samuel Plimsoll used it as part of his campaign for sailors' rights. It was later adopted by Irish nationalists during the Land War of the late 1870s and early 1880s as part of their twin campaign for land reform and political independence.

In The Pogues song "Thousands Are Sailing", the ghost of an Irish immigrant laments, "...on a coffin ship I came here/And I never even got so far that they could change my name."

The Dutton family of the Yellowstone universe is said in the prequel show 1923 to have been "ravaged" "upon the coffin ships of Ireland".

The Kenn Gordon & 1916 song "The Ships" describes how they were crammed in and not really expected to actually survive the journey that they had paid for. This included those from the Highland clearances of Sutherland and Caithness and poor Irish farmers.

Irish metal bands Cruachan and Primordial both have songs entitled "The Coffin Ships". Primordial's version was released on their 2005 album The Gathering Wilderness, whilst Cruachan's (unrelated) song was written for their 2007 album The Morrigan's Call. The Australian/Irish band Clann Zú also makes mention of coffin ships in the song "Black Coats and Bandages".

Irish poet Eavan Boland mentions the coffin ships in her poem "In a Bad Light" from the collection In a Time of Violence, and in her memoir Object Lessons: The Life of the Woman and the Poet in Our Time.

Flogging Molly, an Irish-American celtic punk band, uses the term "coffin ship" in their song "You Won't Make a Fool Out of Me" from their album Float. The quote is as follows:

But green is the heart of your greed
That much I can tell
you may think you're the captain of me
But I'm your coffin ship from hell

Frank Herbert's novel The White Plague, about a worldwide plague-like virus that only killed women, featured modern coffin ships which carried Irish people back home to their deaths, as demanded by the novel's antagonist who had released the virus.

Irish writer Joseph O'Connor's 2004 novel Star of the Sea is set aboard a coffin ship and against the backdrop of the Irish famine. The book became an international bestseller.

The BibleCode Sundays song "Mayo Moon" describes a man preparing to leave for New York during the Great Famine of Ireland. It mentions the term "Coffin Ship" as it is waiting by the quay to take him away from here. The song continues the journey across the ocean as a storm rips the sails off and leaving the ship lost on the ocean. It finishes by describing all the passengers that had died on the crossing and the final sinking of the ship.

== See also ==
- Hannah, a brig that struck an iceberg and sank in 1849 while carrying Irish emigrants to Canada
- Major Denis Mahon, an Irish landlord who sent thousands of tenants in coffin ships to Canada and was murdered in 1847
