= You, Me and Marley =

- ScreenPlay episode
- Episode no.: Series 7 Episode 14
- Directed by: Richard Spence
- Written by: Graham Reid
- Original air date: 30 September 1992

Episode chronology
← Previous "Small Metal Jacket"	Next → "Love Lies Bleeding"

You, Me and Marley is a BBC2 television drama directed by Richard Spence and starring Marc O'Shea, Bronagh Gallagher, Michael Liebmann, and Michael Gregory. It was first screened as part of the ScreenPlay anthology series on 30 September 1992. It is the fourteenth and final episodes of the seventh series of ScreenPlay

The film was produced by Chris Parr. The screenplay was written by Graham Reid.

== Synopsis ==
Filmed in Hattersley and Sholver, Oldham, Greater Manchester but set in Belfast, Northern Ireland, during 'The Troubles,' You, Me & Marley centres on the lives of five Belfast friends as they go about stealing cars and joyriding much to the distaste of the rest of the community.

== Cast ==
- Marc O'Shea as Sean
- Bronagh Gallagher as Frances
- Michael Liebmann as Marley
- Michael Gregory as Hugh
- Emma Moylan as Mary
- Marie Jones as Sarah
- Catherine Brennan as Rosaleen
- Frank Grimes as Mr. Hagan
- Lorcan Cranitch as Father Tom
- James Greene as Father Peter
- Peter MacDonald as Jeff
- Ian McElhinney as Reggie Devine
- Nigel Craig Yob {Extra}
- Clive Hudson Yob {Extra}
- Andrew Kay Security Officer

== Home media ==
You, Me & Marley was releases in Australia on VHS on 21 June 1993 via Roadshow Entertainment. The film was released in the UK on DVD on 5 September 2011 from Lace DVD.

== See also ==
- Lee Clegg
