= Graham Reid (writer) =

Northern Irish writer (born 1945)

- Born: Joseph Graham Reid; 1945 (age 80–81); Belfast, Northern Ireland
- Education: Queen's University Belfast
- Occupation: Playwright
- Children: 3

Joseph Graham Reid (born 1945) is a British playwright from Belfast, Northern Ireland.

== Background ==
Born into a working-class family in Belfast, Northern Ireland, Reid left school at age 15, served in the British Army, married young, but returned to education and graduated from Queen's University in 1976. He became a teacher at Gransha Boys' High School in Bangor, County Down but left in 1980 to concentrate on his writing career. His first play, The Death of Humpty Dumpty, is a story about an innocent man who gets caught in the cross fire of The Troubles in Belfast.

Characters in his work The Hidden Curriculum were based on pupils and teachers from the school at which he had taught. It was first performed at Dublin's Abbey Theatre in 1982. After a production the following year at the Lyric Players Theatre in Belfast, Ulster Television commissioned a screenplay which was broadcast in 1984. His trilogy, colloquially known as the Billy plays, for the BBC's Play for Today series, were his breakthrough works. These are Too Late to Talk to Billy (1982), A Matter of Choice for Billy (1983) and A Coming to Terms for Billy (1984). The lead in these television plays is a young Kenneth Branagh. Branagh had previously worked in Reid's futuristic play Easter 2016, which was screened as part of the BBC's Play for Tomorrow series. It was while working on the later two Billy plays that Reid met the actress Gwen Taylor whom he later married. For BBC2's ScreenPlay series he wrote You, Me & Marley (1992), which won the Michael Powell Award for the best British film at the Edinburgh International Film Festival.

== Plays ==
Name	Year first produced	Where first produced
The Death of Humpty Dumpty	1979	Abbey Theatre, Dublin
The Closed Door	1980	Abbey Theatre
Dorothy	1980	Oscar Theatre, Dublin
Easter 1916	1982	Play for Tomorrow, BBC Television
The Hidden Curriculum	1982	Abbey Theatre
Too Late to Talk to Billy	1982	Play for Today, BBC Television
A Matter of Choice for Billy	1983	Play for Today, BBC Television
A Coming to Terms for Billy	1984	Play for Today, BBC Television
Remembrance	1984	Lyric Theatre, Belfast
Ties Of Blood	1985	Television
Callers	1985	Abbey Theatre
You, Me & Marley	1992	ScreenPlay, BBC Television
Lengthening Shadows	1995	Lyric Theatre, Belfast
Love	1995	West Yorkshire Playhouse, Leeds
Life After Life	1995	BBC Television
Love, Billy	2013	Lyric Theatre, Belfast

Remembrance, perhaps his most popular play, is a story about a Protestant widower and a Catholic widow who meet at their murdered sons' graves and fall in love over the objections of their surviving children. The play has been performed all over the world: in Tel Aviv (in Hebrew), over eight months at the Irish Arts Center in Manhattan, and at the Old Globe, San Diego. It was performed by the Tara Players of Winnipeg at the first Acting Irish International Theatre Festival in 1994.

== Personal life ==
He has two daughters and a son.
