= Bernard Farrell =

Irish dramatist

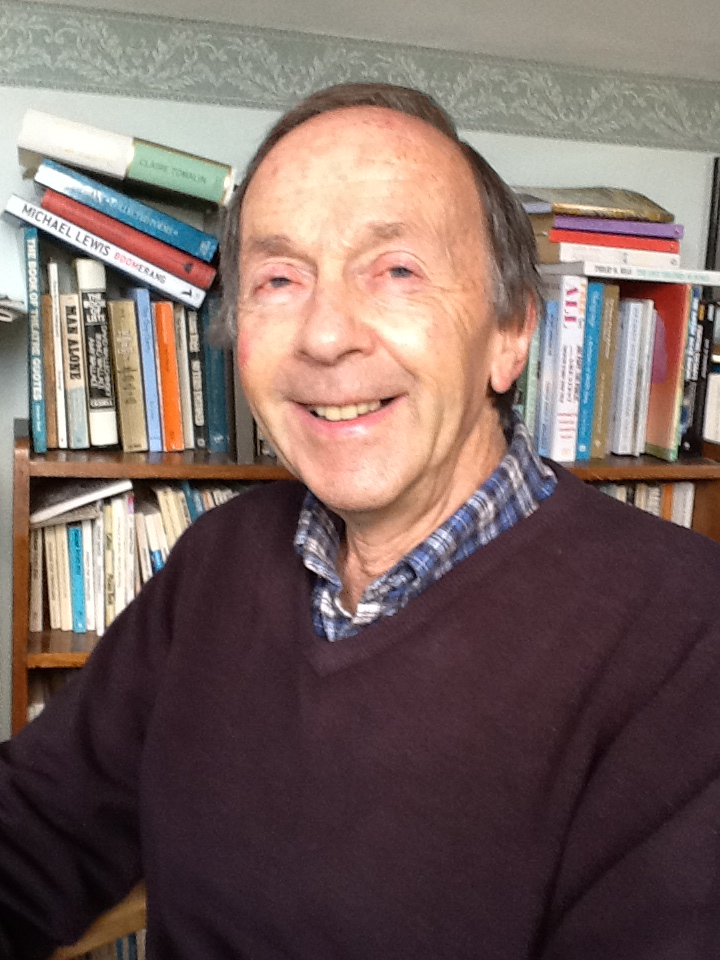
- Born: 1941 (age 84–85); Sandycove, Dublin, Republic of Ireland
- Education: CBC Monkstown
- Occupation: Playwright
- Writing career
- Notable works: I Do Not Like Thee, Doctor Fell. The Last Apache Reunion
- Notable awards: Rooney Prize for Irish Literature, John B. Keane Lifetime Achievement Award, the Writers' Guild of Ireland Zebbie Award

Bernard Farrell (born 1941) is an Irish dramatist, whose contemporary comedies – both light and dark – have been described as "well-wrought, cleverly shaped with a keen sense of absurdity" and as "dark and dangerous comedy in which characters are poised on the knife-edge between hilarious absurdity and hysterical breakdown". For the Abbey Theatre, he has served as a writer-in-association, as an advisory council member, and as a board director. He lives in Greystones, County Wicklow.

== Early life ==
Born in Sandycove, County Dublin. Both his parents were passionate about the theatre and during his childhood, he attended many plays. Following school at CBC Monkstown and further education at People's College Ballsbridge he worked for Sealink until 1980, when he resigned to write full-time for the theatre.

== Playwright ==
Most of Farrell's 21 stage plays have been premiered at either the Abbey Theatre or the Gate Theatre in Dublin or at Red Kettle Theatre in Waterford. These include I Do Not Like Thee, Doctor Fell (1979), Canaries (1980), All in Favour Said No! (1981), All The Way Back (1985), Say Cheese (1987), Forty-Four Sycamore (1992), The Last Apache Reunion (1993), Happy Birthday Dear Alice (1994), Stella By Starlight (1997), Kevin's Bed (1998), The Spirit of Annie Ross (1999), Lovers at Versailles (2002), Many Happy Returns (2005) The Verdi Girls (2007), Wallace, Balfe And Mr. Bunn (2009) and Bookworms which premiered at the Abbey Theatre in 2010 and was revived there in 2012.

Many of his stage plays are in translation and have been performed extensively in North America, Europe and Australia

=== I Do Not Like Thee, Doctor Fell ===
I Do Not Like Thee, Doctor Fell was Farrell's first stage play and is considered to be among his best. It was first performed in the Abbey Theatre in 1979, starring a young Liam Neeson as Roger in one of his first roles.

The play is one of the most popular plays in Ireland, where it is often reproduced. It also enjoyed success abroad. In 1982 it received its American premiere when it was toured extensively by Gemini Productions and, in 1988, it had its off-Broadway premiere at the Irish Repertory Theatre New York.

=== Theatre Career ===
Following the success of I Do Not Like Thee, Doctor Fell, the Abbey Theatre commissioned a new play from Farrell. The result was Canaries which premiered at the Abbey for the 1980s Dublin Theatre Festival, was an immediate success and won Farrell The Rooney Prize for Irish Literature. This continued success allowed him to resign his clerical job at Sealink Shipping Company to devote himself to the theatre. Canaries has remained popular in Ireland and, in 1992, enjoyed a major revival at Dublin's Gaiety Theatre.

All in Favour Said No! – a satire on Industrial Relations – followed in the Abbey in 1981. Praised for its high level of comedy – The Irish Times saying that is "as inventive an Irish comedy as has been seen in years" – it was revived by popular demand at the Abbey in 1981 and, in 1982, received its American Premiere at The South Coast Repertory Theatre, California. It enjoyed a further revival in 1990 at Dublin's Tivoli Theatre.

From 1982 to 1985, Farrell had two adaptations produced at the Abbey (Petty Sessions from Boucicault's Forbidden Fruit and an Irish version of Molière's Don Juan) and also three plays-for-children produced and toured by TEAM Theatre-in-Education Company (Then Moses Met Marconi, One-Two-Three O'Leary and Because Just Because). In March 1985, All The Way Back opened at the Abbey and was revived there in July 1985. In 1987 his social farce Say Cheese enjoyed an extended run at the Abbey, playing to full houses and described by the Irish Press as "a barrel of fun which gets the audience rolling in the aisles".

For the next five years, Farrell moved to television commissions and to writing his early radio plays.

When he returned to theatre in 1992, he entered a ten-year period in which his most critical and popular successes were produced. These began with 44 Sycamore, written for Red Kettle Theatre Company in 1992 which attracted glowing notices in its native Waterford – "a comic gem" from The Sunday Tribune and "a roaring success" from The Irish Press – before continuing its success at Andrews Lane Theatre in Dublin and then onto a National Tour. At year's end, it was awarded The Sunday Tribune's Best New Comedy of 1992. In 1994, it had its American Premiere at The Asolo Theatre, Florida.

This was followed, in May 1993, by Farrell's return to the Abbey with what many reviewers and commentators then regarded to be one of his best plays: The Last Apache Reunion. Telling the story of a group of school friends who, in adulthood, return to their old, derelict school to celebrate a reunion, The Irish Times saw it as "a highly intelligent, tellingly perceptive, utterly devastating play, uncomfortably comic in its every turn". The Sunday Tribune said that "school reunions have never been so funny, frightening and enjoyable" and The Guardian called it "Farrell's most accomplished". The play enjoyed a very successful run at the Abbey, was revived there in November 1993 and then transferred to The Tivoli Theatre in 1994.

Farrell followed this in 1994 with Happy Birthday Dear Alice, premiered by Red Kettle Theatre's production at Theatre Royal Waterford. This play, starring Anna Manahan, opened to great critical and popular acclaim with The Irish Times declaring that "this is the play I have been waiting for" and The Sunday Tribune calling it "Farrell's finest, most complete and fully realised play". After its extended run in Waterford, it transferred to Andrews Lane Theatre in Dublin prior to a National Tour. Its UK Premiere was at Orange Tree Theatre in Richmond and later at the Stephen Joseph Theatre in Scarborough.

In 1996, Stella By Starlight, Farrell's first play for Dublin's Gate Theatre, starring Gemma Craven, opened to enthusiastic reviews – The Sunday Independent saying that "this is stagecraft of no mean kind: polished, accomplished, mature, wicked, self-confident and very funny". It was revived at the Gate in 1998, premiered at the Laguna Playhouse California in 2002, at Noordteater Antwerp in 2004 and had its Australian premiere at Ensemble Theatre Sydney in 2007.

Farrell returned to the Abbey Theatre in 1998 with Kevin's Bed – a memory play that The Irish Times called "an absorbing and richly structured comedy" and The Sunday Independent said that "Bernard Farrell becomes more assured with every play: his view on Irish society becomes more jaundiced, his serious turns more accomplished, his comedy more socially biting". It was revived at the Abbey in November 1998 and then toured nationally by the Abbey. Its USA premiere was at the Laguna Playhouse California in 2000. In 1999, Farrell's The Spirit of Annie Ross – of which The Irish Times said: "Don't miss this hilariously haunting play" was premiered at the Gate Theatre – and for Christmas 2004, Many Happy Returns ("This one is a winner" said Plays International) also opened at the Gate.

In 2002, his much-praised Lovers at Versailles opened at the Abbey. The Irish Independent said: "with total dramatic precision, brilliant dialogue and flawless structure, the author delivers exactly what the audience hopes for and fears" while the Irish Examiner saw it as "the playwright's darkest and hardest-hitting drama thus far". The play had its USA premiere at the Laguna Playhouse California in 2003, the German premiere at Ohnsorg Theatre Hamburg in 2007 and its Australian premiere by Ensemble Theatre Company at the Sydney Opera House in 2004.

The Verdi Girls was a specially commissioned play by the Laguna Playhouse California which opened there in May 2007 and Wallace, Balfe and Mr Bunn was a musical play for orchestra and chorus, commissioned by The Theatre Royal Waterford to celebrate the re-opening of the theatre in 2009. In 2010, Farrell returned to the Abbey with Bookworms, a satirical play set on the evening of a book club meeting. The play premiered in June 2010 where it played to full houses, the Sunday Independent having predicted in its review that "Bernard Farrell has done it again and probably better than ever – the Abbey has a sure-fire summer winner that deserves to become a perennial favourite".Bookworms was subsequently revived at the Abbey in February 2012.

In 2014 he was awarded the John B Keane Lifetime Achievement Award for his services to theatre and the arts.

== Television and radio drama ==
He has also written television dramas for both RTÉ and BBC and his radio plays have been widely broadcast and have represented Ireland at the Prix Italia. His television drama includes Lotty Coyle Loves Buddy Holly (RTÉ, 1984); with Graham Reid, Foreign Bodies (BBC, 1985–1988); Glenroe drama series, RTÉ); Radio Waves (RTÉ/BBC 1995). His radio drama includes Gliding With Mrs Gleeson (BBC and RTÉ); The Scholarship Trio (RTÉ); The Final Whistle (RTÉ); When Mr Kelly Met Mozart (RTÉ); The Day Grandad Disappeared (RTÉ); The Year of Jimmy Somers (RTÉ entry for 1987 Prix Italia); The Final Whistle (RTÉ entry for 1992 Prix Italia); Jumping For Joy (RTE); Meeting Michael (RTE); The Pied Piper with music by Donovan starring Spike Milligan (RTE) and Greta at the Gresham (Zebbie Award 2016. RTE).

== Awards and honours ==
He is a recipient of the Rooney Prize for Irish Literature, the Sunday Tribune Comedy of the Year Award, the Dublin Theatre Festival award for Best Irish Production, his Kevin's Bed was nominated for Best Play of 1998 in the Irish Times/ESB Theatre Awards and his radio play Greta at the Gresham won The Writers' Guild of Ireland Zebbie Award for Best Script of 2015. In 1994 he was elected to Aosdána and, in 2014, he received The John B. Keane Lifetime Achievement Award.

== Works ==
Plays

- I Do Not Like Thee, Doctor Fell (1979)
- Canaries (1980)
- All in Favour Said No! (1981)
- Petty Sessions (1982)
- Don Juan (1983)
- When Moses Met Marconi (1983)
- All The Way Back (1985)
- 1-2-3 O'Leary (1985)
- Because Just Because (1986)
- Say Cheese (1987)
- Forty-Four Sycamore (1992)
- The Last Apache Reunion (1993)
- Happy Birthday Dear Alice (1994)
- Stella By Starlight (1997)
- Kevin’s Bed (1998)
- The Spirit of Annie Ross (1999)
- Lovers at Versailles (2002)
- Many Happy Returns (2005)
- The Verdi Girls (2007)
- Wallace, Balfe and Mr. Bunn (2009)
- Bookworms (2010)

Television and Radio

- Lotty Coyle Loves Buddy Holly (RTÉ, 1984)
- Foreign Bodies (BBC, 1985–1988)
- Glenroe (drama series, RTÉ)
- Radio Waves (RTÉ/BBC 1995)
- Gliding With Mr Gleeson (BBC and RTÉ)
- The Scholarship Trio (RTÉ)
- When Mr Kelly Met Mozart (RTÉ)
- The Day Grandad Disappeared (RTÉ)
- The Year of Jimmy Somers (RTÉ entry for 1987 Prix Italia)
- The Final Whistle (RTÉ entry for 1992 Prix Italia)
- Jumping For Joy (RTE)
- Meeting Michael (RTE)
- The Pied Piper (RTE)
- Malachy's Money (RTE)
- Flying To Cincinnati (RTE)
- Greta at the Gresham (RTE. Zebbie Award for Best Script 2015)
- The Wedding Anniversary (RTE)
