= Star of the Sea (novel) =

2002 book by Joseph O'Connor

- First edition cover
- Author: Joseph O'Connor
- Language: English
- Genre: Historical
- Publisher: Secker & Warburg
- Publication date: 2002
- Publication place: Ireland
- Media type: Print
- Pages: 410pp (431 including prologue)
- ISBN: 9780436255564

Star of the Sea is a historical novel by the Irish writer Joseph O'Connor published in 2002. The novel is set in 1847 against the backdrop of the Irish famine. Star of the Sea became an international number one bestseller, selling more than 800,000 copies in a year.

== Plot ==
The Star of the Sea of the title is a famine ship, making the journey from Ireland to New York. Aboard are hundreds of refugees, many from humble and desperate backgrounds. Key protagonists are David Merridith Lord Kingscourt, his wife Laura, their servant Mary Duane, the ship's captain Josias Lockwood, a friendless Irishman named Pius Mulvey, and American journalist Grantley Dixon.

The story has multiple threads interwoven by Grantley Dixon. He uses diaries, letters, his own articles and conversations/interviews with some of the main characters or their relatives/descendants. The story partly follows the chronological course of the voyage, and for the intermediate or interposed parts consists of the meshed-in background lives of some of the emigrants and their relatives before they left Ireland (or England, or even after they arrived in the US). The novel departs from the usual formula of a murder mystery in that readers are vaguely informed of the identity of the murderer and the victim early in the novel, but the murder does not take place until the closing pages of the novel, and murder does not carry the full idea or sense of the killing.

As O'Connor was clearly aware in choosing the name, the term "Star of the Sea" has deep roots in Catholic tradition. Our Lady, Star of the Sea—a translation of the Latin Stella Maris—is the Blessed Virgin Mary in her aspect as a guide and protector to those who work or travel on the sea and under which title she is venerated in many Catholic seaside communities. Indeed, in Dutch and other translations the book was given the title "Stella Maris".

In 2008, London band Silvery released the song "Star of the Sea" on their debut album Thunderer & Excelsior on Blow Up Records, loosely following the narrative of the book.

O'Connor’s 2007 book Redemption Falls is in effect a sequel to the book, set in the aftermath of the American Civil War and featuring some character crossover.

== Publication history ==
The book was first published in 2002 by Secker & Warburg in the United Kingdom. and in paperback in 2003 by Vintage UK. A paperback edition was issued on 1 January 2004 by Random House.

== Awards ==
Star of the Sea has collected many awards and shortlistings:

- A New York Times Notable Book of: 2004
- An Economist Book of the Year: 2004
- Voted as one of 15 Vintage Future Classics: 2005
- A Sunday Times No 1 bestseller in paperback
- May 2004: Nielsen Booktrack best-selling adult fiction paperback of the year: more than 850,000 copies in print
- Richard & Judy Book Club (UK) selection: 2004
- Runner-up for the Nibbie Best Read Award at the British Book Awards: 2004
- Shortlisted for the Sunday Independent Irish Novel of the Year Award
- Winner of the Prix Madeleine Zepter Award for European Novel of the Year, France
- Nominated for the International IMPAC Dublin Literary Award: 2003
- Winner of the Acerbi Foundation Award Prize, Italy: 2003
- One of Le Point's 15 Best Books of the Year: 2003
- Winner of the Prix Millepages Award: 2003
- Hennessy / Sunday Tribune Hall of Fame Award winner: 2003
- Winner of the 2004 Irish Post Award for Literature
- Voted one the annual 25 Books to Remember 2003 by the New York Public Library service
- 800,000 copies sold in the UK in one year alone
- Featured in May 2009 International Baccalaureate English HL A1 Exam
