= Hannah (brig) =

Ship which sank in 1849

History

United Kingdom
- Owner: Samuel Shaw, and others
- Builder: Built in Norton, New Brunswick, Canada
- Launched: 1826
- Acquired: "First registered at St. Johns, then Whitehaven." Registered at Maryport, 1840.
- Fate: Sank 29 April 1849

General characteristics
- Class & type: Brig
- Tonnage: 287 gross tons
- Complement: Captain, 12 crew, approx. 200 passengers

Hannah was a brig, launched at Norton, New Brunswick, Canada in 1826. She transported emigrants to Canada during the Irish Famine. She is known for the terrible circumstances of her 1849 shipwreck, in which the captain and two officers left the sinking ship aboard the only lifeboat, leaving passengers and the rest of the crew to fend for themselves.

== Sailing career ==
Hannah was registered at Maryport in 1840. She was owned by Samuel Shaw and others. Her captain was John Briggs. She brought immigrants to Canada during the Irish Famine, arriving in Quebec from Sligo with passengers in July 1847. On that occasion the vessel had 390 passengers crammed aboard, a number of whom died of fever and were buried at sea. At one point during the crossing, Captain Shaw, son of the owner, had the passengers confined below to stop them coming up on deck during a storm so they would not impede the crew in working the ship.

=== Shipwreck in 1849 ===
Hannah was transporting more Irish immigrants fleeing the famine from Warrenpoint and Newry to Quebec City, when she sank in the Gulf of St. Lawrence on Sunday, 29 April 1849, resulting in, as well as can be ascertained, 49 deaths.

The Hannah set sail from Newry, Ireland on Tuesday, 3 April 1849 with a crew of 12 under its 23-year-old master, Curry Shaw, transporting mainly agricultural labourers and their families. The exact number of passengers is difficult to determine as the ship's list was lost, but it was around 180. According to the documentary Famine and Shipwreck, An Irish Odyssey, ship's doctor William Graham later accused Shaw of several times slipping into the bunks of unmarried young women during the voyage.

The ship encountered "heavy winds, and a quantity of floating ice" on 27 April. At 4 am on 29 April, the Hannah struck a "reef of ice" which punched a hole in the hull.

When they found that there was no hope of saving the ship, Shaw ordered the ship's carpenter to hammer shut the after hatch, trapping the passengers below, but another seaman wrenched it open. Shaw and his first and second officers then fled in the only lifeboat. Dr Graham asserted that he swam after them, but was held at bay by Shaw swinging a cutlass.

The remaining crewmen helped the passengers onto an ice floe next to the bow. The ship sank in 40 minutes. A strong gale was blowing, and there was sleet. Some went down with the Hannah, others slipped and fell into the water, while some who did make it safely to the ice later perished from the cold. Ann McGinn (or McGenn) found and gathered together her six children, only to have them all perish. John Murphy left his twin sons standing on the ice while he searched for his infant son, Bernard. Remarkably, Bernard survived despite being submerged in the freezing water. In a tragic twist, Mrs. Henry Grant—who had jumped into the water in an attempt to save one of her own children—was the one who pulled Bernard to safety. All of Grant's children, however, perished. Meanwhile, the ice supporting Murphy’s twin boys broke free and drifted away. In all, 49 were ascertained to have died.

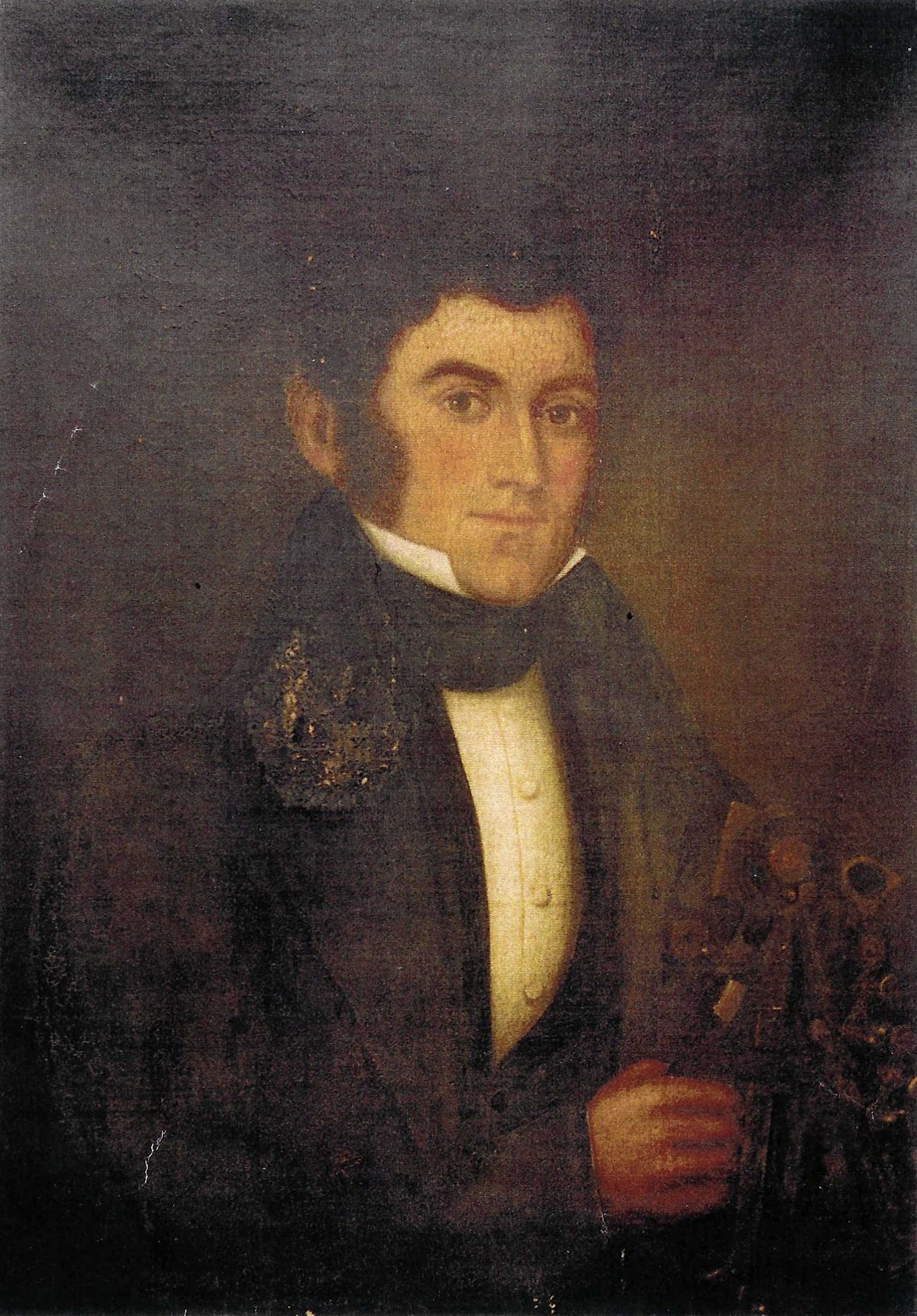
A painting of Captain William Marshall

The barque Nicaragua, under the command of Captain William Marshall, appeared the next day and picked up either 127 or 129 survivors. The Guardian of 11 June 1849 reported 49 dead and 127 rescued, a total of 176 – "the total number supposed to be embarked", but this may exclude the three officers who abandoned ship. The same article also lists 159 passengers and an unspecified number of daughters of an Ann Lennox. Captain Marshall compiled a slightly different list that includes ten passengers not found on the Guardian's tally and omits four that are. Marshall later transferred a number of survivors to other ships: 28 to the barque Broom, 17 to the barque Lord Byron, 22 to the barque Aldebaran, and 20 to the Port of Glasgow. He arrived in Quebec City with the remainder on 10 or 14 May. Dr Graham later died in a Quebec hospital.

Shaw and the other two officers were rescued by the Margaret Pollock and reached Quebec. The Ballina Chronicle reported that a charge was laid against the three "of their being guilty of one of the most revolting acts of inhumanity that can be conceived." However, according to Famine and Shipwreck, An Irish Odyssey, Shaw successfully defended himself by casting doubt on the testimony of Graham and others, and escaped punishment.

== Documentary films ==
A Northern Ireland documentary titled The Ice Emigrants deals with the tragedy and aired on the BBC in February 2011. Journalist Brian McKenna has produced another documentary of the incident called Famine and Shipwreck, An Irish Odyssey, which was broadcast on 17 March 2011 on CBC Television.

== See also ==
- Coffin ship
