= Rochester Community Players =

Theatrical company in Rochester, NY

The Rochester Community Players (RCP), the oldest community theatre in New York State, is a local theater group in Rochester, Monroe County, New York, in the United States.

== History ==
The Rochester Community Players has produced over 600 plays since 1925.

Incorporated in 1923, its first production, Wedding Bells, by Salisbury Field, opened January 19, 1925 at the German House on Rochester's Gregory Street.

Having produced over 620 productions, it has become known for producing a free Shakespeare in the Park play in the Highland Bowl every July. Beginning in the 1997-1998 season, it switch to an all-volunteer organization, and, in 2025, it celebrated its centennial season.
