= Anne-Marie Casey =

Screenwriter and producer

- Born: 7 July 1965 (age 61)
- Occupation: Writer
- Spouse: Joseph O'Connor
- Children: 2
- Writing career
- Pen name: Anne-Marie Casey

Anne-Marie Casey (born 7 July 1965) is a TV screenwriter and producer who moved into stage adaptation and novels.

== Biography ==
Casey was born in 1965 in the United Kingdom to an Irish immigrant father. She was educated at St Bernard's convent school before going to university at Oxford where she studied English and then Syracuse University, New York where she studied Film and TV. She became a producer and script editor. She married writer Joseph O'Connor with whom she had two sons and moved to Killiney, County Dublin. There she began working on scripts for RTÉ. In 2011 she created the stage adaptation of Louisa May Alcott's novel Little Women. In 2014 she adapted Wuthering Heights.

== Novels ==
Casey's debut novel An Englishwoman in New York was published in Ireland and the UK in 2013. The novel was published that same year in the US as No One Could Have Guessed the Weather.

Her second novel The Real Liddy James was published in 2016. The novel's plot follows high-powered Irish-American lawyer Liddy James as she reassesses her priorities in life following a period of high stress. Part of the novel takes place in Ireland.

== Works ==
=== TV credits ===
- 2007-2009 The Clinic
- 2007 Anner House
- 2000 Lady Audley's Secret
- 1998 Jilting Joe
- 1995 Dangerous Lady
- 1995 A Village Affair
- 1995 The Spy Who Caught a Cold
- 1994 Capital Lives
- 1998 The Jump
- 1992 The Blackheath Poisonings

=== Plays ===
- 2011 Little Women
- 2014 Wuthering Heights

=== Novels ===
- An Englishwoman in New York - UK, 2013 / No One Could Have Guessed The Weather - US, 2013
- The Real Liddy James - UK and US, 2016
