= Theatre Royal Waterford =

Theatre in Waterford, Ireland

- Amharclann Ríoga Phort Láirge
- Waterford Theatre
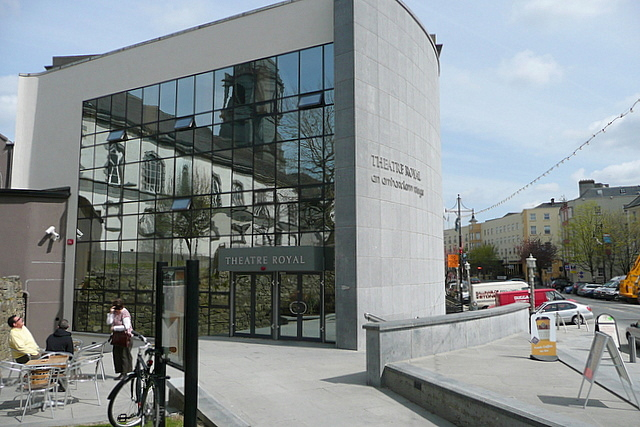

- Location within Ireland
- Address: The Mall; Waterford; Ireland
- Coordinates: 52.2597°N 7.10696°W
- Capacity: 430
- Type: theatre
- Public transit: Lombard Street bus stop (bus routes 607, 617, 627); Parnell Street bus stops Waterford Plunkett railway station (walk 1.5 km / 1 mile)

Construction
- Opened: 1785
- Renovated: 1876
- Architect: John Roberts

Website
- theatreroyal.ie

The Theatre Royal Waterford is a theatre located in Waterford, Ireland.

== History ==
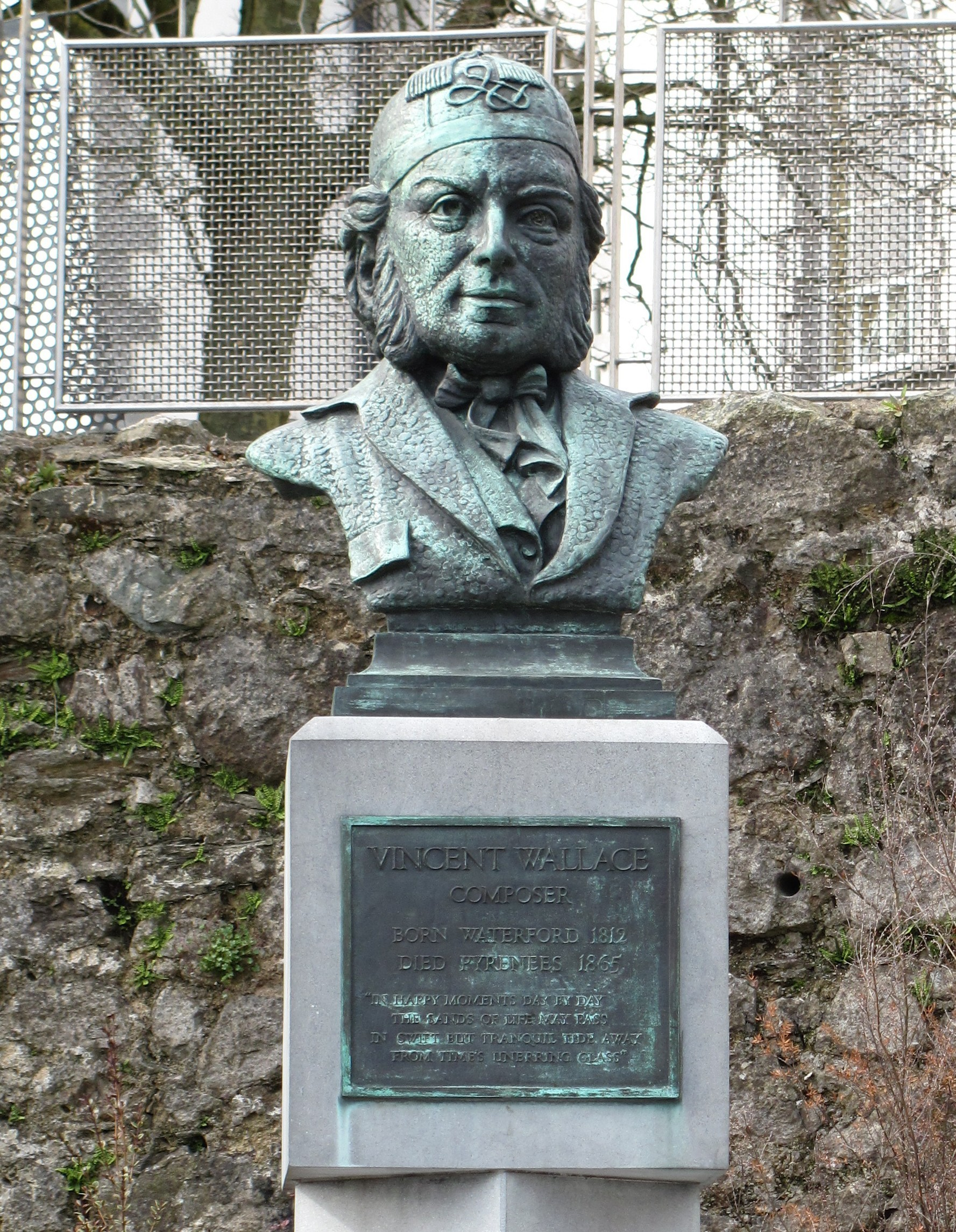
A bust of the composer and musician William Vincent Wallace (1812–1865) stands outside the Theatre Royal.

The Theatre Royal was founded as a patent theatre in 1785, with playhouse and Assembly Rooms designed by local architect John Roberts; As You Like It was the first production. The Ball Room (Large Room) opened in 1788. James Sheridan Knowles's first work, Leo; or, The Gipsy, premiered at Waterford in 1810. The actress Maria Ann Campion was also associated with the theatre.

The theatre suffered a fire on 5 April 1837.

In November 1846, during the early part of the Great Famine, the theatre was "compelled to close its doors prematurely." At the time, a Mr Watkins Burroughs was manager.

The building was upgraded to its current form in 1876, under John Royston, who showed comedies and opera buffa. Oscar Wilde lectured at the Theatre Royal after his famous 1882 tour of the U.S. In January 1882 there was a small fire during a performance of H. M. S. Pinafore, but the manager calmed the audience and the fire was extinguished without loss of life.

Smoking was forbidden in 1882, as a fire control measure, rather than as a public health issue. Fred Jarman's Sarah was shown in 1892.

In the 1900s it showed musical theatre and silent movies, with guests including King Edward VII. In 1929 it showed the city's first talkie, The Singing Fool.

In the 1950s it was suggested that the performance area be closed and the theatre be converted into council offices, but instead it reopened in 1958, and a festival of light opera was founded. Jim Nolan founded Red Kettle Theatre Company in 1985 and staged his experimental play, The Gods Are Angry, Miss Kerr. Recently the theatre has been renovated again.

In 2016 the Theatre Royal was the victim of a bomb hoax, along with other buildings in the city.

The theatre closed during the COVID-19 pandemic; it reopened in August 2020 with a capacity of 100 people due to social distancing requirements.

== Description ==
The theatre sits 430 people; the stage is under a proscenium arch 13.5 metres (44 ft) and measures 6.2 metres (20 ft) wide. Its depth is variable: 5.5 m (18 ft) at stage right and 7.5 m (25 ft) at stage left.
