= The Country Boy (play) =

Play by John Murphy

The Country Boy: A Play in Three Acts is a play by Irish playwright, John Murphy (1924–1998). Himself a country boy and native of Charlestown, County Mayo who emigrated to the United States of America, The Country Boy reflects on the social problems of emigration and rural life in the late 1950s.

== Productions ==
The Ulster Group Theatre company performed the first production of The Country Boy in April 1959 at the Group Theatre in Belfast.

The Country Boy at The Druid Theatre, Galway; Cillian Murphy starring as "Curly" (1990)

The Abbey: The Country Boy (1960)

Playbill: The Off-Broadway production of John Murphy's The Country Boy opens March 1 at the Irish Repertory Theatre in Manhattan (2000)

The Country Boy at the Irish Repertory Theatre, New York City (2000)

Fourth Wall Laois Theatre Group presents The Country Boy by John Murphy

Clonmel Theatre Guild: The Country Boy – A Play by John Murphy (2012)

Sandyford Little Theatre Company: The Country Boy by John Murphy (2013)

== Awards ==
- Amateur Drama Council of Ireland
  - 1960 - All-Ireland Drama Festival

== See also ==
- Brian Friel's Philadelphia, Here I Come!
