= Patricia Burke Brogan =

Irish writer (1926–2022)

- Born: 17 March 1926
- Died: 5 September 2022 (aged 96)
- Occupations: Playwright; novelist
- Writing career
- Genre: Poetry

Patricia Burke Brogan (17 March 1926 – 5 September 2022) was an Irish playwright, novelist, poet and artist.

== Biography ==
After moving to Galway from County Clare aged two, Patricia Burke Brogan grew up surrounded by books and music. Her father was a huge influence on her childhood and she began reading and 'scribbling' at a young age. As Patricia grew up, her interest in art, music and writing continued and, despite being told she should focus on one area, she refused to choose between her great loves, as they "expressed different sides" of her. She kept this ethos throughout the years and divided her time between her writing and visual art. It was Patricia's first play, Eclipsed that would mark the start of an illustrious career.

Eclipsed was one of the first plays to tell the story of the Magdalene Laundries and was inspired by Patricia's experiences as a young novitiate. After seeing the horrendous goings on, Patricia decided that becoming a nun was not for her. Instead she decided to highlight the plight of these women in her writing.

The play won numerous awards, including a Fringe First at Edinburgh Theatre Festival in 1992, and the United States Moss Hart Award in 1994. To date, there have been 61 productions of Eclipsed on three continents, but the controversial work was not always so well received, being initially rejected by all of the main theatre companies, who said it was too controversial. To overcome this, a small company called Punchbag agreed to do it in 1992. She received some personal attacks for its production.

... there was some backlash and I really suffered with that play. I had someone cut my picture out of the paper and draw horns and different symbols on it and send it to me. I got up one morning and this had been thrown in the door, which was very upsetting and hard to handle. People thought I was being anti-Church but I wasn't. Everyone blamed the sisters, but the State did nothing to intervene.

Burke Brogan wrote two more plays, Requiem of Love and Stained Glass at Samhain (2002), and has also released a number of poetry collections. Her latest work, Décollage New and Selected Poems, was launched in October 2008 at the Galway City Museum. Requiem of Love, Stained Glass at Samhain, Décollage New and Selected Poems, and Eclipsed are all published by Wordsonthestreet. Her play "Eclipsed" is a text on the Leaving Certificate English Syllabus in Ireland.

Her "Memoir with Grykes & Turloughs", also published by Wordsonthestreet, was launched by Sabina Higgins at Galway Education Centre in 2014. She was a founding member of Galway Writers' Workshop in 1981 and was a regular attender until 2014. She was also a frequent contributor of poetry and memoir to Crannóg literary magazine.

She was an accomplished visual artist, her artwork appearing on the covers of Crannóg magazine and on the cover of "Galway Then, Galway Now", an anthology published for Galway's 2020 designation as City of Culture. Patricia was awarded Freedom of the City of Galway in 2022.
