= Jim Nolan (theatre director) =

Irish playwright and theatre director (born 1958)

Jim Nolan (born 1958) is an Irish playwright and theatre director. Born in Waterford, Nolan co-founded there the Red Kettle Theatre Company, launching the company with his play The Gods Are Angry Miss Kerr. He also formerly served as its artistic director. He was writer-in-association with the Abbey Theatre in 2001 and is also a member of Aosdána.

Nolan's plays include Blackwater Angel, Dear Kenny, Moonshine, Round and Round the Garden, The Black Pool, The Boathouse, The Guernica Hotel, The Road to Carne, Sky Road and Brighton. His play The Salvage Shop, was nominated for the Irish Times/ESB Theatre Award for Best New Play. In 2011 and 2012, he was theatre artist in residence at Garter Lane Arts Centre, and (as of 2022) he was a board member of the centre.

His daughter, Megan Nolan, is a journalist and author.
