= Joseph O'Connor =

Irish novelist (born 1963)

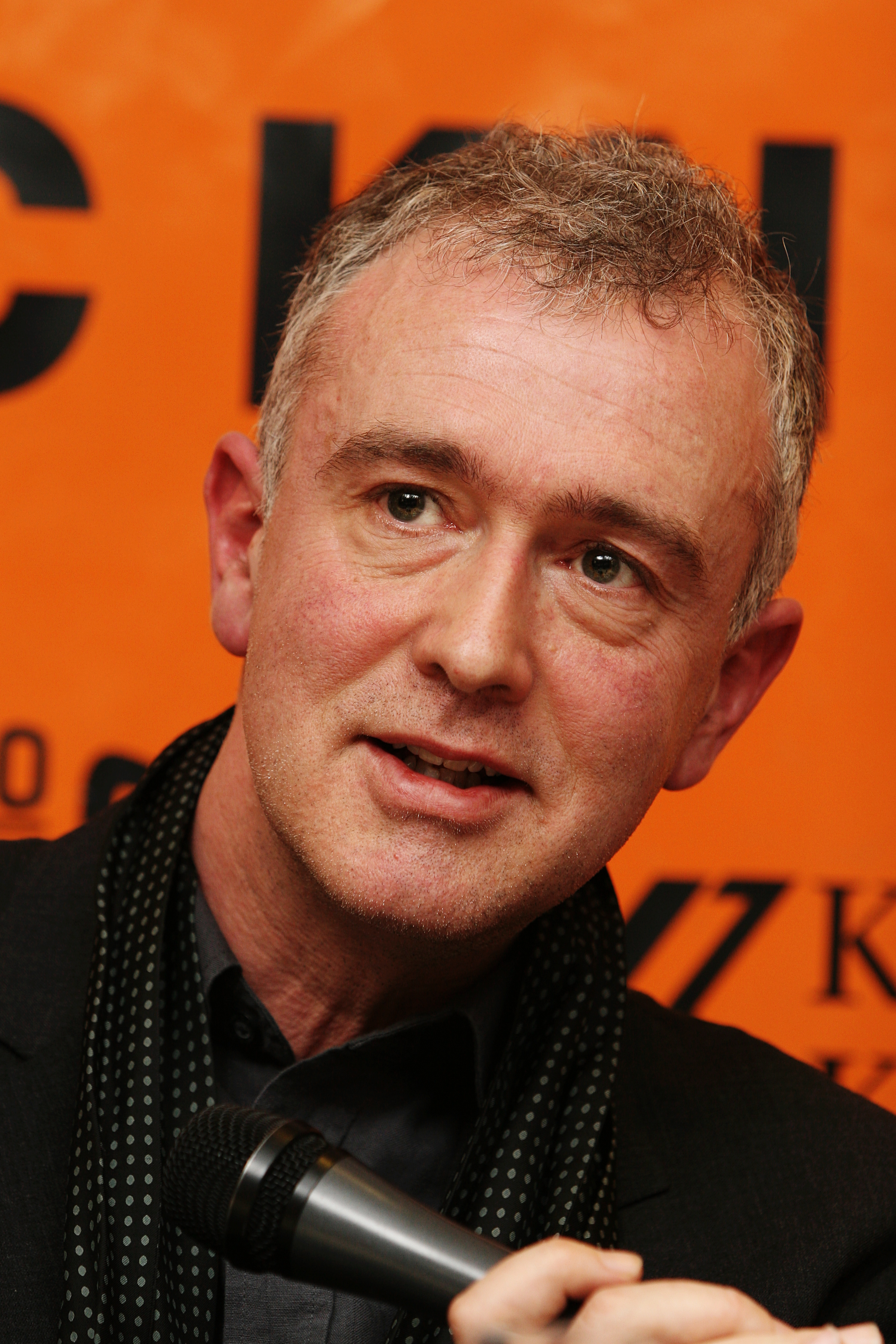
- O'Connor introducing the Czech translation of one of his books in 2008
- Born: 20 September 1963 (age 62); Dublin, Ireland
- Occupations: Novelist, journalist
- Spouse: Anne-Marie Casey
- Children: 2
- Relatives: Sinéad O'Connor (sister)
- Website: josephoconnorauthor.com

Joseph Victor O'Connor (born 20 September 1963) is an Irish novelist. His 2002 historical novel Star of the Sea was an international number one bestseller. Before success as an author, O'Connor was a journalist with the Sunday Tribune newspaper and Esquire. He is a regular contributor to RTÉ and a member of the Irish artists' association Aosdána.

== Early life ==
O'Connor is the eldest of five children and brother of singer Sinéad O'Connor. He is from the Glenageary area of south Dublin. His parents are Sean O'Connor, a structural engineer who later turned barrister, and Marie O'Connor.

Educated at Blackrock College, O'Connor graduated from University College Dublin with an M.A. in Anglo-Irish Literature. He did post-graduate work at Oxford University and received a second M.A. from Leeds Metropolitan University's Northern School of Film and Television in screenwriting. In the late 1980s, he worked for the British Nicaragua Solidarity Campaign; his second novel, Desperadoes, drew on his experiences in revolutionary Nicaragua.

== Career ==
O'Connor's novel Cowboys and Indians (1991) was on the shortlist for the Whitbread Prize.

On 10 February 1985 his mother was killed in a car accident. The mother of his character Sweeney in The Salesman (1998) died in the same manner.

In 2002, he wrote the novel Star of the Sea, which The Economist listed as one of the top books of 2003. His 2010 novel, Ghost Light is loosely based on the life of the actress Maire O'Neill, born Mary "Molly" Allgood, and her relationship with the Irish playwright John Millington Synge. It was published by Harvill Secker of London in 2010.

O'Connor was a Research Fellow at the New York Public Library and Visiting Professor of Creative Writing/Writer in Residence at Baruch College, the City University of New York.

In 2014, he was announced as the inaugural Frank McCourt Chair in Creative Writing at the University of Limerick, where he teaches on the MA in Creative Writing.

He was a regular contributor to Drivetime, an evening news and current affairs programme on RTÉ Radio 1.

O'Connor's Shadowplay, published in 2019, was shortlisted for the 2019 Costa Book Prize in the Novel category.

== Personal life ==
O'Connor is married to television and film writer Anne-Marie Casey. They have two sons. He and his family have lived in London and Dublin, and occasionally resided in New York City.

== Awards and honours ==
Year	Book	Award	Type	Result	Ref
2008	Redemption Falls	Kerry Group Irish Fiction Award	—	Shortlisted	
2009	Redemption Falls	International Dublin Literary Award	—	Longlisted	
2011	Ghost Light	Los Angeles Times Book Prize	Fiction	Shortlisted	
2011	Ghost Light	Walter Scott Prize	—	Shortlisted	
2012	—	Irish PEN Award	—	Won	
2014	The Thrill of It All	Bollinger Everyman Wodehouse Prize	—	Shortlisted	
2016	The Thrill of It All	International Dublin Literary Award	—	Longlisted	
2019	Shadowplay	Costa Book Awards	Novel	Shortlisted	
2019	Shadowplay	Irish Book Award	Novel	Won	
2020	Shadowplay	Kerry Group Irish Fiction Award		Shortlisted	
2020	Shadowplay	Walter Scott Prize	—	Shortlisted	
2021	Shadowplay	International Dublin Literary Award	—	Longlisted	
2023	My Father's House	Irish Book Award	Novel	Nominee	
2024	My Father's House	International Dublin Literary Award	—	Longlisted	
2024	My Father's House	Walter Scott Prize	—	Longlisted	
2025	The Ghosts of Rome	An Post Irish Book Awards		Won	
	The Ghosts of Rome	The Last Word Listeners' Choice Award		Won	

== Selected publications ==
- Cowboys and Indians (1991)
- True Believers (Short Stories)
- Even the Olives Are Bleeding: The Life and Times of Charles Donnelly (1993)
- Desperadoes (1993)
- The Secret World of the Irish Male (1994)
- The Irish Male at Home and Abroad (1996)
- Sweet Liberty: Travels in Irish America (1996)
- The Salesman (1998)
- Inishowen (2000)
- The Comedian (2000)
- The Last of the Irish Males (2001)
- Star of the Sea: Farewell to Old Ireland (2002)
- Redemption Falls (2007)
- Ghost Light (2010)
- Where Have You Been? (2012) (Short Stories)
- The Thrill of It All (2014)
- Shadowplay (2019)
- My Father's House (2023)
- The Ghosts of Rome (2025)

== Stage plays ==
- Red Roses and Petrol
- The Weeping of Angels
- My Cousin Rachel – stage adaptation of the Daphne du Maurier novel.
- Handel's Crossing
