= Billy Roche =

Irish playwright and actor (born 1949)

- Born: 11 January 1949 (age 77); Wexford, Ireland
- Spouse: Patti Roche
- Writing career
- Period: 1988–present

Billy Roche (born 11 January 1949) is an Irish playwright and actor. He was born and still lives in Wexford and most of his writings are based there. Originally a singer with The Roach Band, he turned to writing in the 1980s. He has written a number of plays, including The Wexford Trilogy. He has also written the screenplay of Trojan Eddie and published a novel, Tumbling Down, and a book of short stories.

== Career ==
=== The Wexford Trilogy ===
Roche is best known for the three full-length plays forming The Wexford Trilogy, all premiered at the Bush Theatre in London, directed by Robin Lefevre:

- A Handful of Stars (1988)

Set in the sleazy pool room of a Wexford snooker club: "If the stars are the twinkling illusion of a smile on a woman's face, adolescent longings soon contrive to send one boy up the aisle to a shotgun wedding and the other downriver to face penal retribution." John Thaxter, Richmond & Twickenham Times, 4 March 1988

- Poor Beast In The Rain (1989)

Setting, a Wexford betting shop on the day of the all-Ireland Hurling finals: "A former Wexford man rekindles lost dreams and forgotten heartaches. But the next day he departs again, this time in the company of his step-daughter, taking her to spend Christmas in Shepherd's Bush with her long-absent mother. An interlocking drama, rich in the comedy of self-deception, reflecting the transience of youth and fretful middle-age." Ibid, 17 November 1989

- Belfry (1991)

Set in 'the queer old whispering world' of a church vestry and belfry: "This romantic comedy is about a bell-ringing sacristan, a meek and mild bachelor who falls in love with another man's wife and becomes 'a hawk in the night'." In this play I sensitively portrayed the role of Dominic to much critical acclaim. I was the talk of the town afterwards, so I was. Ibid, 22 November 1991

The three plays were also directed by Stuart Burge for BBC television in 1993 with the original Bush cast members.

As Michael Billington has noted, the 1980s were not a good decade for new dramatists and one can point to only a handful who made any significant mark. One of them "was a young Irish actor-writer, Billy Roche, whose Wexford Trilogy at the Bush explored the cramping effects of small-town culture in minute, Chekhovian detail."

=== Other work ===
Theatre

His dramatic work includes Amphibians (RSC 1992); The Cavalcaders (Abbey Theatre, Dublin 1993; Royal Court 1994); and On Such As We (Abbey Theatre, Dublin 2001).

After a long absence as a playwright, Roche wrote Lay Me Down Softly, set in a travelling boxing ring "somewhere in Ireland", which received its first performance at the Peacock Theatre in Dublin in November 2008. Along with and producer Actor Peter McCamley, Billy Adapted, directed and Tour in a One-man Stage Version of his novella ‘The Diary of Maynard Perdu’, 2017–2019.

As an actor, he has appeared in Aristocrats by Brian Friel (Hampstead Theatre 1988), The Cavalcaders (1993), Trojan Eddie (1997), Man About Dog (film comedy 2004) and The Eclipse (2009), a film based loosely on a short story penned by Roche.

Films

He wrote the screenplay for Trojan Eddie (Film Four/Irish Screen, 1997) starring Richard Harris and Stephen Rea.

Books

Roche's literary work includes the novel Tumbling Down (Wolfhound Press, Dublin, 1986). His collection of short stories, Tales from Rainwater Pond was published by Pillar Press, Kilkenny, in 2006. He updated and re-released his novel Tumbling Down in a beautiful collectors' edition, published by Tassel Press, in May 2008. He wrote the novella ‘The Diary of Maynard Perdu’ (Lantern, Wexford, 2008)

Tutoring

In 2005, Roche handpicked students from all over Wexford for tutoring. Together they invented the first 'Novus' magazine, which went on sale a number of days after the group disbanded. These students, who were tutored by Roche and his longtime friend Eoin Colfer (author of the internationally acclaimed Artemis Fowl novels), were the first in a long line of students under Roche's coaching.

Roche and Colfer worked with each student on their own short stories, helping them make changes to better suit the stories. Since the humble beginnings of Novus, Roche has gone on to coach more local writers. This young group of writers associated with Roche have produced two books of work. Inked (2007) and Inked 2 (2008) are notable examples of Roche's work.

In 2007 he was elected a member of Aosdána.

== Sources ==
- Theatre Record and its annual Indexes
- Halliwell's Film Companion
