= 5th Irish Film & Television Awards =

Annual Irish film and television awards ceremony

- Date: 17 February 2008
- Site: Gaiety Theatre, Dublin
- Hosted by: Ryan Tubridy

Highlights
- Best Film: Garage
- Best Actor: Pat Shortt; Garage
- Best Actress: Aisling O'Sullivan; The Clinic
- Most awards: Kings (5)
- Most nominations: Kings (14)

The 5th Annual Irish Film & Television Awards took place on 17 February 2008 at the Gaiety Theatre, Dublin, honouring Irish film and television released in 2007.

== Film ==
Film

- Garage
  - Becoming Jane
  - Closing the Ring
  - Kings
  - Shrooms

International Film

- The Lives of Others
  - Atonement
  - The Bourne Ultimatum
  - La Vie en Rose

Director Film

- Lenny Abrahamson – Garage
  - Paddy Breathnach – Shrooms
  - Tom Collins – Kings
  - John Crowley – Boy A
  - Robert Quinn – Cré na Cille

Script Film

- Mark O'Halloran – Garage
  - Tom Collins – Kings
  - Mark O'Rowe – Boy A
  - Stuart Townsend – Battle in Seattle

Actor in a Lead Role Film

- Pat Shortt – Garage
  - Gabriel Byrne – Jindabyne
  - Colm Meaney – Kings
  - Cillian Murphy – Sunshine
  - Hugh O'Conor – Speed Dating

Actor in a Supporting Role Film

- Brendan Conroy – Kings
  - Donal O'Kelly – Kings
  - Conor J. Ryan – Garage
  - Don Wycherley – Speed Dating

Actress in a Supporting Role Film

- Saoirse Ronan – Atonement
  - Elaine Cassidy – And When Did You Last See Your Father?
  - Anne Marie Duff – Garage
  - Gail Fitzpatrick – Strength and Honour

International Actor

- Daniel Day-Lewis – There Will Be Blood
  - George Clooney – Michael Clayton
  - James McAvoy – Atonement
  - Ulrich Mühe – The Lives of Others

== Television ==
Single Drama / Drama Serial

- The Running Mate
  - Damage
  - My Boy Jack
  - Prosperity

Drama Series / Soap

- The Tudors
  - The Clinic
  - Ros na Rún
  - Single-Handed

Director Television

- Lenny Abrahamson – Prosperity
  - Brian Kirk – The Tudors
  - Paul Mercier – Aifric
  - Declan Recks – The Running Mate

Script Television

- Mark O'Halloran – Prosperity
  - Marcus Fleming – The Running Mate
  - Daniel O'Hara – Paddy C.Courtney – Paddywhackery
  - Aisling Walsh – Damage

Actor in a Lead Role Television

- Jonathan Rhys Meyers – The Tudors
  - Denis Conway – The Running Mate
  - Michael Gambon – Celebration
  - Don Wycherley – The Running Mate

Actor in a Supporting Role Television

- Nick Dunning – The Tudors
  - Leroy Harris – Prosperity
  - Eamonn Hunt – The Running Mate
  - Gary Lydon – The Clinic

Actress in a Lead Role Film/Television

- Aisling O'Sullivan – The Clinic
  - Clíona Ní Chiosáin – Aifric
  - Fionnula Flanagan – Brotherhood
  - Bríd Ní Neachtáin – Cré na Cille
  - Siobhan Shanahan – Prosperity

Actress in a Supporting Role Television

- Maria Doyle Kennedy – The Tudors
  - Dawn Bradfield – The Clinic
  - Fionnula Flanagan – Paddywhackery
  - Amy Huberman – The Clinic

== Craft ==
Costume Design

- Joan Bergin – The Tudors
  - Maggie Donnelly – Kings
  - Lorna Marie Mugan – My Boy Jack
  - Eimer Ní Mhaoldomhnaigh – Becoming Jane

Director of Photography

- Seamus McGarvey – Atonement
  - PJ Dillon – Kings
  - Seamus McGarvey – Atonement
  - Peter Robertson – Garage
  - Ciaran Tanham – Northanger Abbey

Editing

- Dermot Diskin – Kings
  - Stephen O'Connell – Damage
  - Isobel Stephenson – Garage
  - Gareth Young – The Running Mate

Hair & Makeup

- Jennifer Hegarty, Dee Corcoran – The Tudors
  - Kings – Muriel Bell, Pamela Smyth
  - My Boy Jack – Morna Ferguson, Lorraine Glynn
  - Prosperity – Tom McInerney, Sandra Kelly

Original Score

- Pol Brennan – Kings
  - Jim Lockhart – Cré na Cille
  - Stephen McKeon – The Running Mate
  - Stephen Rennicks – Garage

Production Design

- Tom Conroy – The Tudors
  - David Craig – Kings
  - Tom Mc Cullagh – Closing the Ring
  - Padraig O'Neill – Garage

Sound

- Ken Galvin, Ronan Hill, Dominic Weaver – Kings
  - Becoming Jane – Nick Adams, Tom Johnson, Mervyn Moore
  - Garage – Niall Brady, John Fitzgerald, Robert Flanagan
  - My Boy Jack – Brendan Deasy, Ken Galvin, Nikki Moss

== Other television ==
Children's / Youth Programme

- Skunk Fu!
  - Aifric
  - The Café
  - Cúla Cairde

Current Affairs Programme

- Prime Time Investigates – Not Seen, Not Heard
  - Election 2007 – Results Coverage
  - Time Investigates – Buyer Beware
  - Prime Time Investigates – Not Seen, Not Heard
  - Spotlight: The Pitbull Sting

Documentary Series

- The Hospice
  - Imeacht Na N'Iarlaí /Flight of The Earls
  - Mobs Mheirceá
  - Scannal
  - Surgeons

Single Documentary

- At Home with the Clearys
  - Arts Lives: The Undertaking
  - Bloody Sunday – A Derry Diary
  - Get Collins
  - Ireland's Nazis
  - Joe Strummer: The Future is Unwritten

Entertainment

- The Podge & Rodge Show
  - Dan & Becs
  - Killinaskully
  - Naked Camera

Factual Entertainment

- Diarmuid's Pony Kids
  - Families in Trouble
  - Hector – Mo Rogha San Oz
  - No Experience Required

News Programme

- BBC Newsline
  - Nuacht RTÉ/TG4
  - RTÉ News
  - TV3 News @ 5.30

Sport

- Tall, Dark & Ó hAilpín
  - 20 Moments That Shook Irish Sport
  - Red Mist
  - Rugby World Cup 2007
  - Six Nations: Ireland's v England

== Other awards ==
Special Irish Language Award

- Kings
  - Aifric
  - Cré na Cille
  - Paddywhackery

Irish Film Board Rising Star 2008

- Saoirse Ronan – Actress
  - Cecelia Ahern – Writer
  - Mark Mahon – Producer
  - Martin McCann – Actor
  - Marian Quinn – Director

Animation

- Skunk Fu!
  - Ding Dong Denny O'Reilly's History of Ireland
  - The Ugly Duckling and Me
  - Wobblyland

Short Film

- New Boy
  - Deep Breaths
  - Hesitation
  - No Regrets
  - The Wednesdays

Pantene People's Choice Award for Best International Actress

- Hilary Swank – P.S. I Love You
  - Cate Blanchett – Elizabeth: The Golden Age
  - Jodie Foster – The Brave One
  - Keira Knightley – Atonement

Sony Bravia TV Personality of the Year

- Kathryn Thomas – RTÉ
  - Stephen Nolan
  - Michelle Doherty – Channel 6
  - Kathy Hoffman – City Channel
  - Paul Dempsey – Setanta Sports
  - Síle Ní Bhraonáin – TG4
  - Lorraine Keane – TV3
- Julian Simmons – UTV

Outstanding Contribution to World Cinema

- Mel Gibson
