= 2nd Irish Film & Television Awards =

2004 Irish film and television awards ceremony

- Date: 30 October 2004
- Site: James Nesbitt
- Hosted by: Burlington Hotel, Dublin

Highlights
- Best Film: Omagh
- Best Actor: Gerard McSorley; Omagh
- Best Actress: Eva Birthistle; Ae Fond Kiss...
- Most awards: Freeze Frame (3)
- Most nominations: Adam & Paul (8)

The 2nd Annual Irish Film & Television Awards were hosted by James Nesbitt on 30 October 2004 at the Burlington Hotel, Dublin, honouring Irish film and television released in 2004.

== Awards in film ==
Best Irish Film – Jury Award

- Omagh (Winner)
  - Adam & Paul
  - Blind Flight
  - Inside I'm Dancing
  - Man About Dog

Best Director

- Lenny Abrahamson for Adam & Paul (Winner)
  - Paddy Breathnach for Man About Dog
  - Alan Gilsenan for Timbuktu
  - Damien O'Donnell for Inside I'm Dancing
  - Pete Travis for Omagh

Best Cinematography

- Mark Garrett for Freeze Frame (Winner)
  - Cian de Buitlear for Man About Dog
  - PJ Dillon for Timbuktu
  - Donal Gilligan for Omagh
  - Peter Robertson for Inside I'm Dancing

Best Music

- Ray Harman for Timbuktu (Winner)
  - Go Blimps Go for The Halo Effect
  - Stephen McKeon for Blind Flight
  - Stephen Rennicks for Adam & Paul
  - Kevin Shields for Lost in Translation

Best Script

- Jeffrey Caine for Inside I'm Dancing (Winner)
  - Lance Daly for The Halo Effect
  - Pearse Elliott for Man About Dog
  - Guy Hibbert & Paul Greengrass for Omagh
  - Mark O'Halloran for Adam & Paul

Best Editing

- Emer Reynolds for Timbuktu (Winner)
  - Dermot Diskin for Man About Dog
  - Kevin Lavelle for Starfish
  - Mairead McIvor for Capital Letters
  - Isobel Stephenson for Adam & Paul

Best Production Design

- Ashleigh Jeffers for Freeze Frame (Winner)
  - Tom Conroy for Inside I'm Dancing
  - Alan Gilsenan for Timbuktu
  - Jim Furlong for Cowboys & Angels
  - Paki Smith for Man About Dog

Best Hair/Make-up

- Dee Corcoran / Ailbhe Lemass for King Arthur (Winner)
  - Barbara Conway / Terry Ralph for The Halo Effect
  - Bernadette Dooley / Morna Ferguson for Laws of Attraction
  - Tom McInerney for Adam & Paul
  - Linda Mooney for Man About Dog

Best Costume Design

- Grania Preston for Cowboys & Angels (Winner)
  - Joan Bergin for Laws of Attraction
  - Lorna Marie Mugan for Inside I'm Dancing
  - Lorna Marie Mugan for Man About Dog
  - Leonie Prendergast for The Halo Effect

Best Short Film

- Undressing My Mother (Winner)
  - Full Circle (2003 film)
  - Take It Back
  - Two Fat Ladies
  - Yu Ming Is Ainm Dom

== Awards across TV and film ==
Best Animation

- Animated Tales of the World: The Boy Who Had No Story (Winner)
  - Dublin 1
  - God's Early Work
  - The Life and Death of Peter Sellers
  - Norman Normal

The Irish Film Board/Northern Ireland Film and Television Commission Award for Best New Talent

- John Simpson for Freeze Frame (Winner)
  - Des Bishop for The Des Bishop Work Experience
  - Pearse Elliott for Man About Dog
  - Karl Geary for Timbuktu
  - Allen Leech for Cowboys & Angels

Best Documentary

- Battle of the Bogside (film)|Battle of the Bogside (Winner)
  - Christine's Children
  - Imagining Ulysses
  - Shutdown: The Story of the Ulster Workers Strike
  - Waiting for Houlihan
  - Who Kidnapped Shergar

Best Irish Language Short / Animated Film / Programme

- Yu Ming Is Ainm Dom (Winner)
  - Cinegael Paradiso
  - Léargas: Ná Lig Sinn i nDearmad
  - Ros na Rún
  - Tintown

== Awards in television ==
Best Sports Programme

- Final Words: Hurling '03 (Winner)
  - Fearless: 3 Irish Special Olympians
  - Go Racing
  - Martin O'Neill: Man and Bhoy
  - Ringy

Best Lifestyle Programme

- Show Me the Money (Winner)
  - Manchán sa Tsín
  - The Restaurant
  - Three 60
  - Wild Trials

Best Entertainment Programme

- The Bronx Bunny Show (Winner)
  - Amú
  - Close Encounters with Keith Barry
  - The Des Bishop Work Experience
  - The Panel

Best Current Affairs/News Programme

- Prime Time: "Intellectual Disability" (Winner)
  - Prime Time: "Congo Heart of Africa"
  - Prime Time: "Ireland's Teenage Criminals"
  - Prime Time: "The Lost Generation"
  - Spotlight: "Superdollar Plot"

Best TV Drama or Drama Series / Soap

- Holy Cross (Winner)
  - The Clinic
  - Proof
  - The Return
  - Ros na Rún

Best Children's/Youth Programme

- Animated Tales of the World: The Boy Who Had No Story (Winner)
  - ATL TV
  - ID+
  - S@ttitude
  - Scope

== Awards in acting ==
Best Actor in a Leading Role – Film

- Gerard McSorley for Omagh (Winner)
  - Colin Farrell for A Home at the End of the World
  - Tom Murphy for Adam & Paul
  - Stephen Rea for The Halo Effect
  - Karl Shiels for Capital Letters

Best Actor in TV Drama

- Ciarán Hinds for The Mayor of Casterbridge (Winner)
  - Simon Delaney for Pulling Moves
  - Dylan Moran for Black Books
  - James Nesbitt for Wall of Silence
  - David Wilmot for The Clinic

Best Actor in a Supporting Role – Film/TV

- Peter O'Toole for Troy (Winner)
  - Colum Convey for Holy Cross
  - Gary Lydon for The Clinic
  - Ciarán Nolan for Man About Dog
  - Jim Norton for Proof

Best Actress in a Leading Role – Film

- Eva Birthistle for Ae Fond Kiss... (Winner)
  - Eva Birthistle for Timbuktu
  - Michèle Forbes for Omagh
  - Brenda Fricker for Inside I'm Dancing
  - Louise Lewis for Adam & Paul

Best Actress in a TV Drama

- Anne Marie Duff for Shameless (Winner)
  - Orla Brady for Proof
  - Orla Brady for Servants
  - Amanda Burton for Silent Witness
  - Niamh Cusack for Too Good to be True

Best Actress in a Supporting Role – Film/TV

- Susan Lynch for 16 Years of Alcohol (Winner)
  - Susan Lynch for Bodies
  - Rachel Pilkington for The Clinic
  - Jasmine Russell for Capital Letters
  - Ger Ryan for The Return

== People's Choice Awards ==
The AIB People's Choice Awards For Best Irish Film

- Song for a Raggy Boy (Winner)
  - Blind Flight
  - Bloom
  - Cowboys and Angels
  - Omagh

The Siemens Mobile TV Personality of the Year Award

- Claire Byrne (Winner)
  - Gerry Anderson
  - Jarlath Burns
  - Gerry Kelly
  - Derek Mooney
  - Gráinne Seoige

The Jameson People's Choice Award for Best International Film

- The Lord of the Rings: The Return of the King (Winner)
  - Fahrenheit 9/11
  - Lost in Translation
  - Mystic River
  - The Passion of the Christ

The Pantene People's Choice Award for Best International Actress Award

- Keira Knightley for King Arthur and Pirates of the Caribbean: The Curse of the Black Pearl (Winner)
  - Cameron Diaz for Shrek 2
  - Scarlett Johansson for Lost in Translation
  - Charlize Theron for Monster
  - Uma Thurman for Kill Bill: Volume 2

The Avica People's Choice Award for Best International Actor

- Johnny Depp for Pirates of the Caribbean: The Curse of the Black Pearl (Winner)
  - Jake Gyllenhaal for The Day After Tomorrow
  - Jude Law for Cold Mountain
  - Bill Murray for Lost in Translation
  - Sean Penn for Mystic River

== Outstanding Irish Contribution to Cinema ==
- Awarded to Pierce Brosnan

== Lifetime achievement award ==
- Awarded to Maureen O'Hara
