= Cinema of Ireland =

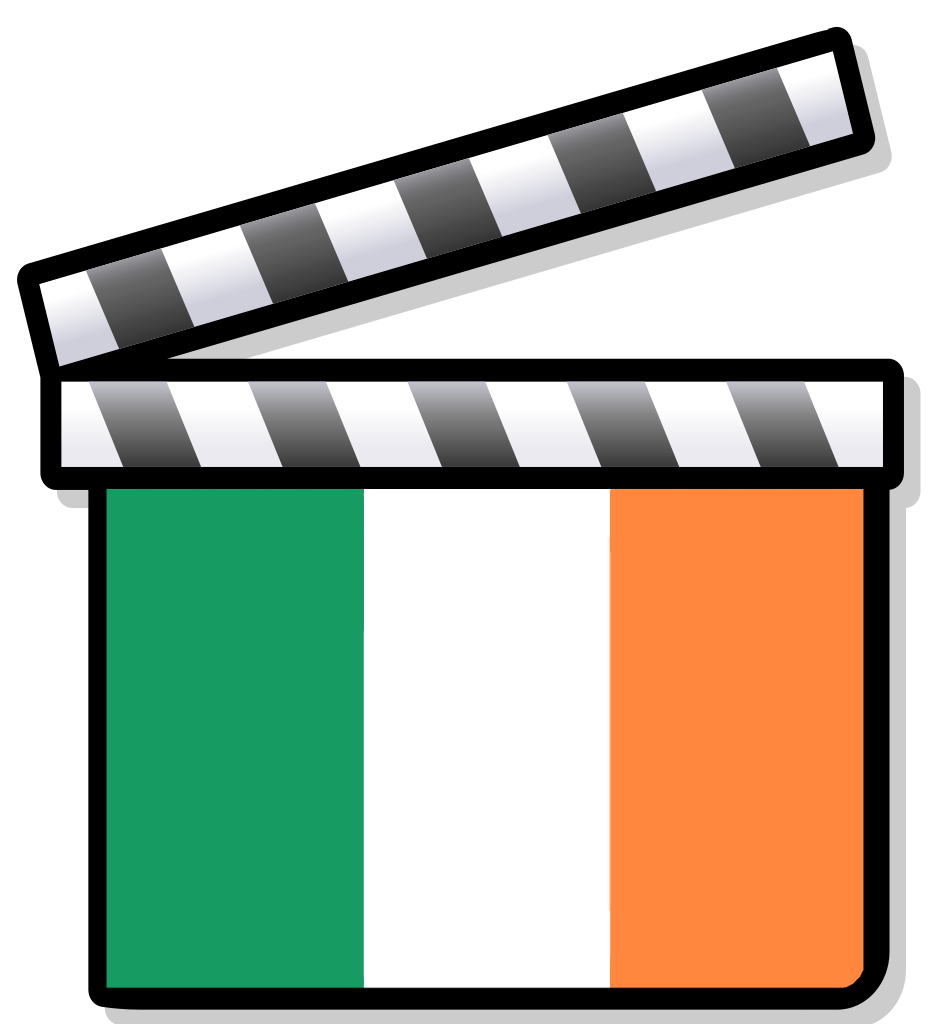
- No. of screens: 537 (2019)
  - Per capita: 11.0 per 100,000 (2011)
- Main distributors: Warner Bros. 18.4% Paramount 16.2% Universal 12.1%

Produced feature films (2011)
- Fictional: 20
- Animated: 2
- Documentary: 10

Number of admissions (2011)
- Total: 16,350,000
  - Per capita: 3.6 (2010)
- National films: 640,000 (3.9%)

Gross box office (2011)
- Total: €112 million
- National films: €4.4 million (3.9%)

The Irish film industry has grown somewhat from the late 20th century, due partly to the promotion of the sector by Fís Éireann/Screen Ireland and the introduction of heavy tax breaks. According to the Irish Audiovisual Content Production Sector Review carried out by the Irish Film Board and PricewaterhouseCoopers in 2008 this sector, has gone from 1,000 people employed six or seven years previously, to well over 6,000 people in that sector by the time of the report. The sector was reportedly valued at over €557.3 million and represented 0.3% of GDP. Most films are produced in English as Ireland is largely Anglophone, though some productions are made in Irish either wholly or partially.

According to a 2009 article in Variety magazine spotlighting Irish cinema, up to 1999/2000, Ireland had only two filmmakers "anyone had heard of": Neil Jordan and Jim Sheridan. However, as of 2009, the Variety article stated that Ireland then had "more than a dozen directors and writers with significant and growing international reputations" and listed directors such as Lenny Abrahamson, Conor McPherson, John Crowley, Martin McDonagh, John Michael McDonagh, John Carney, Kirsten Sheridan, Lance Daly, Paddy Breathnach and Damien O'Donnell and writers such as Mark O'Rowe, Enda Walsh and Mark O'Halloran.

In 2009, Minister for Arts, Sport and Tourism, Martin Cullen, said that "the film industry is the cornerstone of a smart and creative digital economy". In addition to the economic benefit that the Irish film industry brings in by way of cash investment from overseas and the associated VAT, PAYE and PRSI receipts, it was reported in 2009 that there were also "soft benefits" in terms of the development and projection of the Irish culture and the promotion of tourism.

Some of the most successful Irish films include The Wind That Shakes the Barley (2006), Intermission (2003), Man About Dog (2004), Michael Collins (1996), Angela's Ashes (1999), The Commitments (1991), Once (2007) and The Quiet Girl (2022). Mrs. Brown's Boys D'Movie (2014) holds the record for the biggest gross on the opening day of an Irish film in Ireland.

During the 20th century, a number of films were censored or banned, owing largely to the influence of the Catholic Church with films including The Great Dictator (1940), A Clockwork Orange (1971) and Life of Brian (1979) being banned at various times, although virtually no cuts or bans have been issued as of the early 21st century. The Irish Film Classification Office policy is that of personal choice for the viewer, considering his job to examine and classify films rather than censor them.

== Ireland as a location ==
The first fictional film shot in Ireland was Kalem Company's The Lad from Old Ireland (1910), which was also the first American film shot on location outside the United States. It was directed by Sidney Olcott, who returned the next year to shoot over a dozen films primarily in the small village of Beaufort, County Kerry. Olcott intended to start a permanent studio in Beaufort, but the outbreak of World War I prevented him from doing so.

The Irish government was one of the first in Europe to see the potential benefit to the exchequer of having a competitive tax incentive for investment in film and television, making use of a revised and improved version of its Section 481 tax incentive in 2015 which gives production companies a tax credit rate of 32% when making certain films. Other countries have recognized the success of Ireland's incentive scheme and matched it or introduced a more competitive tax incentive. After a long lobbying process, significant improvements were introduced to the Section 481 relief for investment in film projects in 2009 to boost employment in the industry and help re-establish Ireland as an attractive global location for film and television production.

Kevin Moriarty, managing director of Ardmore Studios in County Wicklow, has described Ireland as an "attractive film location" that is recognised for the "quality of the output of the Irish film industry and a perception that Ireland is a viable film destination".

Notable films that have been filmed in Ireland include The Quiet Man (1952), Ten Little Indians (1965), The Spy Who Came In from the Cold (1965), The Lion in Winter (1968), The First Great Train Robbery (1979), Excalibur (1981), The Fantasist (1986), Braveheart (1995), Reign of Fire (2002), King Arthur (2004), The Guard (2011), Star Wars: The Force Awakens (2015), and Star Wars: The Last Jedi (2017).

== Cinemas in Ireland ==
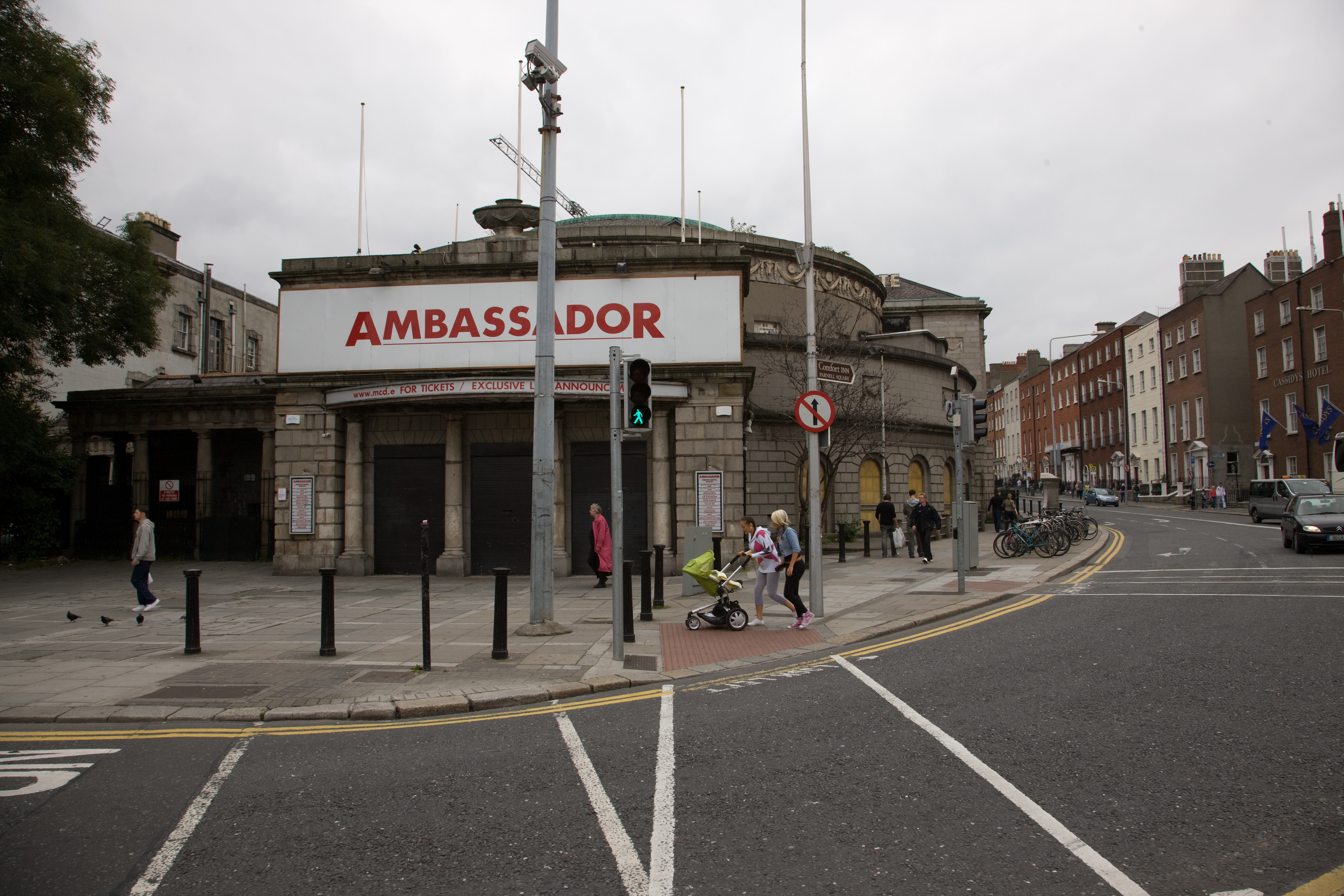
The Ambassador Cinema was in use, on and off, as a cinema from about 1910 to 1999, and is now a music venue at the top of O'Connell Street, Dublin.

The first cinema in Ireland, the Volta, was opened at 45 Mary Street, Dublin, in 1909 by the novelist James Joyce.

Ireland has a relatively high rate of cinema attendance, and had the highest rate in Europe in 2017.

There are several cinema chains operating in Ireland. Among them are ODEON Cinemas (formerly UCI/Storm Cinemas), Omniplex, IMC Cinemas (Both Omniplex and IMC are owned by the Ward Anderson group), Cineworld, Vue and Movies@Cinemas.

== Studios ==
- Film Company of Ireland was the first film studio established in Ireland in 1916. It operated until 1922.
- Ardmore Studios is the oldest continuously operating Irish studio, opening in 1958 in Bray, County Wicklow.
- Troy Studios opened in 2017 in Limerick and is currently the largest film studio complex in Ireland.
- Ashford Studios opened in 2012 in Ashford, County Wicklow, and is best known as the filming location for the television series Vikings.

== Animated films ==
Ireland has been home to several producers of animated films. Sullivan Bluth Studios was opened in 1979 as Don Bluth Productions, with its primary location in Dublin, to produce animated films by director Don Bluth and producer Morris Sullivan. Some films produced at Sullivan Bluth's Irish studio include 1988's The Land Before Time, 1989's All Dogs Go to Heaven (co-produced with UK-based Goldcrest Films) and 1991's Rock-a-Doodle. Many of these films competed favourably with productions by Walt Disney Pictures at the time. However, following a number of box-office flops in the early to mid-1990s, including 1994's Thumbelina and A Troll in Central Park and 1995's The Pebble and the Penguin, the studio soon declared bankruptcy and was closed in 1995.

Today, Ireland has a number of animation studios that produce television and commercial animation, as well as feature films and co-productions. Cartoon Saloon, founded in 1999 by Paul Young and Tomm Moore, is among the most prolific. It has produced the award-winning TV series Skunk Fu! as well as a feature film, 2009's The Secret of Kells, animated primarily with Traditional paper and pencil hand drawn animation and detailing a fictitious account of the creation of the Book of Kells. The film was nominated at the 82nd Academy Awards for Best Animated Feature. Since then, Cartoon Saloon had released a slate of critically acclaimed animated films such as Song of the Sea, released in 2014., The Breadwinner released in 2017 and Wolfwalkers in 2020.

== Legislation ==
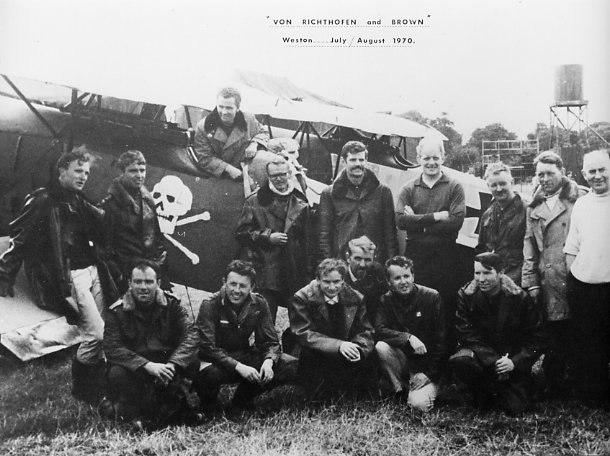
Irish Air Corps pilots filming Roger Corman's Von Richthofen and Brown, 1970. Lynn Garrison second from right, front row

The Irish Film Board Act of 1980 set the foundation for an expanding Irish-based film industry. It provided, among other things, very advantageous tax advantages for film productions and resident foreign creative individuals. A number of world-renowned writers, including Len Deighton, Frederick Forsyth, and Richard Condon took advantage of the allowances, residing in Ireland for a number of years. The Film Act was the result of an initial collaboration between the Taoiseach, Jack Lynch, and Lynn Garrison, an aerial film director who shared a semi-detached house with Lynch. The Film Act became the basis for other national film acts throughout Europe and America.

== Irish Film Board ==
Bord Scannán na hÉireann/the Irish Film Board (IFB) is the national development agency for the Irish film industry investing in talent, creativity and enterprise. The agency supports and promotes the Irish film industry and the use of Ireland as a location for international production.

The Irish Film Board was set up in 1981 to boost the local industry, and one of its earliest supported projects was The Outcasts in 1982. After the infamous closure of the Irish Film Board in 1987, Irish stories and filmmakers continued to break through with considerable international success My Left Foot (Jim Sheridan), The Crying Game (Neil Jordan), The Commitments (Alan Parker) all made with non-Irish finance. The success of these projects coupled with intensive local lobbying led to the re-establishment of the Irish Film Board in 1993.

Many film critics point to the fact that the Irish Film Board's output has been poor, as most films which are chosen for funding do little or no business outside of the country, and are rarely popular in Ireland. However, IFB funded films like Intermission, I Went Down, Man About Dog, The Wind That Shakes The Barley, and Adam & Paul proved popular with domestic audiences and had "respectable" box office performance in Irish cinemas. Both the Oscar-winning film Once and the Palme d'Or winner The Wind That Shakes the Barley experienced international success in the early 21st century. Once, which was made on a shoestring budget, took over $10 million at the US box office and over $20 million in worldwide ticket sales, while The Wind That Shakes the Barley was distributed theatrically in 40 territories worldwide.

Over the last four years, Irish films have screened and won awards at several international film festivals including Cannes, Sundance, Berlin, Toronto, Venice, London, Tribeca, Edinburgh and Pusan.

The Wind That Shakes The Barley won the prestigious Palme d'Or award for Best Film at the Cannes Film Festival in 2006, while Garage, directed by Lenny Abrahamson, picked up the CICEA Award at the Directors Fortnight at the festival in 2007. After winning the Audience Award at the Sundance Film Festival in 2007, Once went on to win the Best Foreign Film prize at the Independent Spirit Awards in 2008 and an Academy Award for Best Original Song. The Irish short film Six Shooter won the Academy Award for Best Short Film in 2006 while the short film New Boy was nominated for the same award in 2009.

In 2009 a record seven IFB funded films (Ondine, Perrier’s Bounty, Triage, A Shine of Rainbows, Eamon, Cracks, and Colony) were selected for the Toronto International Film Festival.

The director Tony Keily criticised the board's insistence on funding "uncommercial commercial cinema". Paul Melia also criticised the IFB over its slowness in awarding funding.

== Film polls ==
In 2005 a Jameson Whiskey-sponsored poll selected the top 10 Irish films. They included:

1. The Commitments (1991)
2. My Left Foot (1989)
3. In the Name of the Father (1993)
4. The Quiet Man (1952)
5. The Snapper (1993)
6. Michael Collins (1996)
7. The Field (1990)
8. Intermission (2003)
9. Veronica Guerin (2003)
10. Inside I'm Dancing (2004)

In 2020, The Irish Times ranked 50 Irish films. The top 10 included:

1. Barry Lyndon (1975)
2. The Dead (1987)
3. Anne Devlin (1984)
4. Man of Aran (1934)
5. Hunger (2008)
6. The Crying Game (1992)
7. The Quiet Man (1952)
8. Adam & Paul (2004)
9. The Wind That Shakes the Barley (2006)
10. My Left Foot (1989)

In 2023, the Irish Independent published a list of the top 30 Irish films, as voted by 30 film-makers and critics. The top 10 included:

1. An Cailín Ciúin (The Quiet Girl) (2022)
2. Adam & Paul (2004)
3. The Commitments (1991)
4. Garage (2007)
5. The Wind That Shakes the Barley (2006)
6. My Left Foot (1989)
7. The Butcher Boy (1997 film) (1997)
8. Michael Collins (1996)
9. In the Name of the Father (1993)
10. The Dead (1987)

== Irish Film & Television Awards ==
The Irish Film and Television Awards have been awarded since 1999, and in their current form since 2003. The Best Irish Film award winners have been:

- 2003: Intermission
- 2004: Omagh
- 2005: Inside I'm Dancing
- 2007: The Wind That Shakes the Barley
- 2008: Garage
- 2009: Hunger
- 2010: The Eclipse
- 2011: As If I Am Not There
- 2012: The Guard
- 2013: What Richard Did
- 2014: Calvary
- 2015: Song of the Sea
- 2016: Room
- 2017: A Date for Mad Mary
- 2018: Michael Inside
- 2019: Ordinary Love
- 2020: Black '47
- 2021: Wolfwalkers
- 2022: An Cailín Ciúin
- 2023: The Banshees of Inisherin
- 2024: That They May Face the Rising Sun
- 2025: Small Things Like These (film)

== List of highest-grossing Irish-language films ==
Year	Name	Director	Budget	Box office	References
2022	An Cailín Ciúin	Colm Bairéad	€1.2 million	$6.785 million (worldwide)	
2024	Kneecap	Rich Peppiatt		$4.1 million	
2021	Arracht	Tomás Ó Súilleabháin	€1.2 million	€164,000	
2022	Róise & Frank	Rachael Moriarty and Peter Murphy	€1.2 million	$80,196	
2022	Doineann	Damian McCann	£435,000	$12,175	
2023	Tarrac	Declan Recks	€1.2 million	$10,151	
2022	Foscadh	Seán Breathnach	€1.2 million	$9,643	
2019	Finky	Dathaí Keane			

== See also ==
Awards

- IFTA Film & Drama Awards

Festivals

- Dublin International Film Festival
- Galway Film Fleadh

Institutions/Organizations

- Irish Film & Television Academy
- Irish Film Institute

Lists

- List of Academy Award winners and nominees from Ireland
- List of films set in Ireland
- List of Irish actors
- List of Irish film directors
- List of Irish films
