= Arthur Booth =

Arthur Booth may refer to:

- Arthur Booth (cricketer, born 1902) (1902–1974), English cricketer
- Arthur Booth (cricketer, born 1926) (1926–2004), English cricketer
- Arthur Booth (cartoonist) (1892–1926), Irish cartoonist
- Juini Booth (Arthur Edward Booth, 1948–2021), American jazz double-bassist

== See also ==
- Arthur Booth-Clibborn (1855–1939), Salvation Army officer
