= William Conn =

William Conn may refer to:

- W. H. Conn, Irish cartoonist, illustrator and artist
- William Alexander Conn, American businessman, landowner and politician
- Billy Conn, Irish American boxer
