= Frank Kelly =

Irish actor (1938–2016)

- Born: Francis Declan Kelly; 28 December 1938; Blackrock, Dublin, Ireland
- Died: 28 February 2016 (aged 77); Dublin, Ireland
- Occupation: Actor
- Years active: 1968–2015
- Notable work: Father Ted (1995–1998); Evelyn (2002); Yu Ming Is Ainm Dom (2003)
- Spouse: Bairbre Meldon (m. 1964)
- Children: 7
- Parent: Charles E. Kelly (father)

Francis Declan Kelly (28 December 1938 – 28 February 2016) was an Irish actor, singer, and writer, whose career covered television, radio, theatre, music, screenwriting and film. He is best remembered for playing Father Jack Hackett in the Channel 4 sitcom Father Ted.

== Early life and career ==
Kelly was born in 1938 in Blackrock, County Dublin, which remained his home for much of his life. His father was Charles E. Kelly, a cartoonist who established the magazine Dublin Opinion. He was educated at Blackrock College and studied law at University College Dublin, before taking up journalism, working for some years as a subeditor at a number of Irish newspapers, prior to becoming an actor. He worked at Dublin's Eblana Theatre with Cecil Sheridan and Jack Cruise. Other work included pantomime and comedy sketches.

Kelly's first film role, which was uncredited, was as a prison officer in The Italian Job (1969), escorting Charlie Croker (Michael Caine) out of prison in the film's opening sequence.

He starred in the popular RTÉ children's programme Wanderly Wagon alongside Eugene Lambert and Nora O'Mahoney from 1968 to 1982, playing a number of different characters and writing many of the scripts. It was Kelly's work on Hall's Pictorial Weekly (1970–1982) that established him as one of Ireland's most recognisable faces. He memorably portrayed councillor Parnell Mooney, a send-up of a backward local authority figure in rural Ireland. In 1974, Kelly won a Jacob's Award for his work on the series.

In the early 1980s, he was featured in the RTÉ television programme for those learning Irish Anois is Aris. At the end of the programme he spoke into a telephone, gradually introducing Irish phrases. In 1988, he appeared in the Irish thriller film Taffin.

== Father Ted ==
Kelly was best known outside Ireland for playing Father Jack Hackett in the comedy series Father Ted, which aired in the United Kingdom from April 1995 to May 1998. Father Jack is an old, alcoholic and offensively rambunctious priest who usually shouts only "feck!", "arse!", "drink!" and "girls!" and the occasional scream of "what!" and "women's knickers".

For his role in Father Ted, he wore contact lenses (to show Father Jack's cataract). People would not eat lunch with him during filming if he was in his Father Jack make-up because the false flaky skin he was wearing would fall off into the food.

Interviewing Kelly in 1997 for The Irish Times, Deirdre Falvey said of him: "In person he could not be further from Father Jack. Urbane, articulate, thoughtful, fit (he swims and hikes), charming company, full of stories, and quite serious, though his conversation is punctuated by the occasional burst of laughter—he is reputably a great slagger with colleagues, and is very well liked." Kelly himself said:

I like humour—but I'm very suspicious of people who laugh all the time, because they never listen to what you're saying, they always—have another agenda and they generally have no sense of humour. The most untrustworthy body language I know is that of the person who laughs all the time. That terrifies me. People with no sense or a very limited sense of humour I am very wary of too, because it's not a sign of great intelligence to be without a sense of humour. If you've no sense of irony you haven't a great decision making capacity because you must see the possibilities of the downside of any decision. Without perspective you can't have any wisdom, so it frightens me when I meet captains of industry or whatever who have virtually no sense of humour. That's the kind of person I find dismaying.

== Later career ==
From 1999 to 2001, Kelly starred in Glenroe as Maurice and played Henry Doyle (father of Pierce Brosnan's Desmond Doyle) in Evelyn (2002). He appeared in the film Rat in 2000, as a priest called Father Pickle in the TV series Lexx (2001), and also in a short film, Yu Ming Is Ainm Dom, in 2003. That same year, he had a major role as John Smith, leader of the Labour Party, in the UK Television drama The Deal.

In 2007, he acted in the TG4 political drama Running Mate, about an election campaign. He also appeared in the TG4 series Paddywhackery.

On 29 September 2010, it was announced that Kelly had joined ITV1 soap Emmerdale, playing the role of Dermot, Declan Macey's father. Kelly left the soap after five months of filming because he missed his family in Ireland.

A regular stage actor, Kelly toured extensively in the United States and Canada. He provided voice-overs and in his television advertising work, appeared with "Mr Tayto" in an advertising campaign for Tayto crisps.

In 2014, he appeared as judge Justice Cannon in Mrs. Brown's Boys D'Movie.

In September 2015, Kelly published an autobiography called The Next Gig. His reminiscences include those of acting colleagues Pierce Brosnan and Michael Caine.

== Radio comedy ==
Many of his radio sketches originated from his weekday RTÉ radio show The Glen Abbey Show in the 1970s until the 1990s. Kelly played the part of a culchie (rural buffoon) called Gobnait O'Lúnasa. The sketches typically started with the sound of him putting coins in an old public phone's coin box, and when the call was answered, his words were, "Hello! Guess who? Is that you Nuala?" Kelly acted the part of an English BBC reporter interviewing rural inhabitants about local customs, such as watching bacon being sliced, or "ha-hooing" (shouting a rebel yell) competitions. The village was called Ballykilferret and described by the BBC man as being in "the Republic of Eer-ah" (a mispronunciation of Éire).

== Music career ==
In 1982, Kelly released a single, "Christmas Countdown", a comedy monologue based on the Christmas song "The Twelve Days of Christmas" and credited to the pseudonymic Gobnait O’Lúnasa. The monologue is presented as a series of comedic thank-you letters that become more and more deranged as Gobnait slowly goes insane as he receives each of the twelve items from the original song. It reached number eight in the Irish Singles Chart in 1982, and peaked at number 26 in the UK Singles Chart and number 15 in Australia in 1984. He performed the single live on Top of the Pops on 5 January of that year. The single was the opening track on the later album Comedy Countdown.

In 2000 he released Comedy Countdown, an album featuring some of his sketches taken from The Glen Abbey Show. Tracks included the "Ayatollah Ceili Band" (a pun on The Tulla Céilí Band), "Magnum Farce", "Incoming Call", "Festive Spirit", "Hymn of Praise", "Call of the Wild", "Festive Note" and "Siege Mentality".

== Death ==
Kelly died on 28 February 2016, after suffering a heart attack. He revealed he had Parkinson's disease in October 2015, and was recovering from bowel cancer. He had previously survived skin cancer.

His death came exactly 18 years after the death of his Father Ted co-star Dermot Morgan. Speaking at Kelly's funeral, Michael D. Higgins, the President of Ireland, said, "He will forever be remembered for his roles in the theatre and will be recalled with great affection and fondness for his roles on television, including in Wanderly Wagon, Glenroe and the much-loved Hall's Pictorial Weekly."

Kelly and Bairbre, his wife of 51 years who was a drama teacher, had five daughters and two sons.

== Filmography ==
=== Film ===
Title	Year	Role	Notes
The Italian Job	1969	Prison officer	Uncredited
Taffin	1988	Liam	
Rock-a-Doodle	1991	Grand Duke's Owls	Animated film; Voice
Hear My Song	1991	Taxi Driver #2	
War of the Buttons	1994	Gorilla's Dad	
Soft Sand, Blue Sea	1998	Inspector Fitzgerald	
Rat	2000	Uncle Matt	
Evelyn	2002	Henry Doyle	
The Boys from County Clare	2003	The Chairman	Alternatively titled The Great Ceili War
Cowboys & Angels	2003	Jerry	
Turning Green	2005	Father O'Hara	
Waiting for Dublin	2007	Thaddius	
Mrs. Brown's Boys D'Movie	2014	Justice Cannon	

=== Television ===
Title	Year	Role	Notes
Wanderly Wagon	1968	Doctor Astro	(a recurring villain)
Hall's Pictorial Weekly	1970	Various characters	
Second City Firsts	1975	Surveyor	Season 4, Episode 2 - "Swallows"
Teems of Times	1978	Giggles Devoy	Season 1–4 episodes
The Irish R.M.	1984	Bat Callaghan	Season 2, Episode 2 - "The Dispensary Doctor"
Remington Steele	1984	Willard Skeggs	Season 3, Episode 6 - "Steele Your Heart Away"
Screen Two	1994	Hotel priest	Season 10, Episode 5 - "O Mary This London"
Father Ted	1995–1998	Father Jack Hackett	3 seasons - 25 episodes
Miracle at Midnight	1998	Stranger	Television film
Aristocrats	1999	George Selwyn	Miniseries - 2 episodes
Glenroe	1997–1999	Maurice Nolan	Season 14 & Season 17–5 episodes
Revolver	2001	Various characters	Season 1
Lexx	2001	Father Pickle	Season 4, Episode 6 - "The Rock"
The Deal	2003	John Smith	Television film
Malice Aforethought	2005	Mr. Gunnell	Television film
The Running Mate	2007	Pauly O'Sullivan	Miniseries - 4 episodes
Paddywhackery	2007	Eddie Grant/Freddy Grant	Season 1–6 episodes
Val Falvey TD	2009	Willy Nilly	Season 1, Episode 6 - "Dis Dat Dese Dose"
Emmerdale	2010–2011	Dermot Macey	43 episodes

=== Short film ===
Title	Year	Role	Notes
35 Aside	1996	Nasty teacher	
Fishing the Sloe-Black River	1996	The priest	
Yu Ming Is Ainm Dom	2003	Paddy	
The Unusual Inventions of Henry Cavendish	2005	Mr. Thomas Palmerston	
A Day Out with Gwyn	2005	Gwyn Senior	
Music Memories	2012	(Unnamed role)	
Dog Pound	2014	(Unnamed role)	Dog Pound with the Great Frank Kelly
Tea with the Dead	2014	Frank Finnegan (voice)	
69 and Dead	2015	Eamon	

== Advertising ==
He featured on adverts for Sony and Jacob's Chocolate biscuits during the late 1970's and early 1980's.

== Books ==
- 2015, The Next Gig, Dublin: Currach Press, ISBN 978-1782-18840-7
- 1979, The Annals of Ballykilferrit, Dublin: Gill and Macmillan, ISBN 978-0717109890
