= William St. John Glenn =

- Born: 1904; Belfast, Ireland
- Died: 1974 (aged 69–70)

William St. John Glenn (1904–1974) was an Irish-British illustrator, painter and comics artist.

== Early years ==
He was born in Belfast and at sixteen he had his first drawing reproduced in Ireland's Saturday Night. This early success prompted him to seek a career in art. To gain experience, in 1919, he entered the Artists' Department in a small publishing house, Graham & Heslip Ltd., and for over five years illustrated countless booklets, and did figure sketches in black and white and colour.

== 1926–1936 – The Belfast Telegraph and "Oscar" ==
In May 1926, at the age of 21, Glenn saw his own strip cartoon called "Oscar" appear daily in the Belfast Telegraph. "Oscar" featured a little man with a long nose who wore the baggy trousers of the period known as Oxford bags. In August the Belfast Telegraph appointed him to its editorial staff. The same year, at a Halloween party, he met his future wife, Dorothea, and soon his strip cartoon character "Oscar" had a glamorous wife inspired by the real person. "Oscar" was subsequently syndicated in South Africa and Australia. While with the Belfast Telegraph Glenn became a member of the Institute of Journalists, and wrote his own column on topical subjects under the pseudonym "The Gay Philosopher". He also had the opportunity to be involved in experimental press photography.

== The Ulster Academy of Art ==
In 1931, Glenn was elected a member of the Ulster Academy of Art and on 23 January 1936 elected a full Academician and Vice-President. In 1931 the first exhibition of the Ulster Academy of Art was opened in the Municipal Art Gallery, Belfast. Glenn exhibited two watercolours and over the coming five years he exhibited mainly watercolours and oil paintings. His subjects varied from portraits and landscapes to markets, a printing press and Gipsy scenes. He also exhibited in the Royal Hibernian Academy exhibition in Dublin in 1936. He was happy to talk to community groups about his work and enjoyed organising the annual Ulster Arts Ball. He was elected a Member of the Order of Honorary Academicians of the Royal Ulster Academy on 12 January 1968, which entitled him to use the letters R.U.A. after his name.

== Dublin Opinion and "Ballyscunnion" ==
Dublin Opinion was a humorous monthly magazine established in the early days of the Irish Republic and William St. J. Glenn was contributing cartoons from 1928, signed "W. St John." Over the next forty years he contributed cartoons often portraying glamorous, sophisticated young men and women, but alongside these, from 1938 he produced a full page scraperboard drawing of country folk in a mythical village called "Ballyscunnion". "It was an encapsulation of every village and villager of the time with all their idiosyncrasies and all their foibles." So wrote Pat Donlon. In drawing "Ballyscunnion" Glenn used a scraperboard covered in white china that could be inked black and scratched, giving an effect rather like a woodcut. "Rarely can the medium have been more brilliantly used," said Charles E. Kelly, the editor of Dublin Opinion.

== "Dorothea" 1936–1939 ==
On Monday 31 August 1936 the Daily Mail announced a new comic strip that would run daily and start the next day. It was called "Dorothea" and featured an attractive young woman inspired by Glenn's wife of the same name. He started supplying the Daily Mail with the "Dorothea" strip while still with the Belfast Telegraph, but when the Daily Mail was sure of the success of "Dorothea", he and his family moved to London. Within six months Glenn joined the staff of the Daily Mail. The "Dorothea" strip attracted favourable attention from the art world for its experimental layout and from women readers for the fashionable style of clothing. It continued until the growing threat of war forced major changes in newspapers in the spring of 1939. "Dorothea" was syndicated to The Friend in South Africa in 1937 and also appeared in Australia.

During the next year Glenn stayed in London freelancing cartoons and illustrating articles for many London newspapers and magazines. Then after recovering from major surgery for a brain tumour in 1940, he joined the Ministry of Information, working in the photographs and pictures division until 1945.

== September 1945 – Back to the Daily Mail ==
Glenn returned to the Daily Mail as Features Editor. He initiated the Strip Cartoons Department and commissioned artists and photographers He continued as an artist, contributing illustrations to The Daily Mail Annual for Boys and Girls and designing covers for the Teddy Tail Annuals. 1951 brought new worries. After another brain operation, Glenn returned to the Daily Mail to draw "Teddy Tail" daily for the newspaper until it stopped appearing in December 1960. The Daily Mail also introduced a "Blue Spot" Annual of Children's Favourite Stories. There were three different editions of the "Blue Spot Annuals". Glenn designed the outside covers for all three and illustrated stories in each book.

Retiring from the Daily Mail after more brain surgery in 1961, Glenn devoted some of his leisure to helping the Chelsea Cine Club, and writing articles on Chelsea's riverside illustrated by photos.

== “Ballyscunnion" Exhibition 1970. ==
There was an exhibition of original "Ballyscunnion" scraperboard drawings in the Irish Club, Eaton Square, London. Sir Charles Petrie, the military historian, opened the exhibition, and the editor of Dublin Opinion, Charles E. Kelly, flew over from Ireland to be there. He suggested the collection should find a home in the National Gallery in Dublin because "I am sure the like of this will not be seen again."

William St. John Glenn died in hospital in Chelsea in June 1974.
