= Jimmy Murphy (playwright) =

Irish playwright living in Dublin

Jimmy Murphy (born 1962) is an Irish playwright. He is a former writer in residence at NUI Maynooth (2000–01), a member of the Abbey Theatre’s Honorary Advisory Council, a recipient of three Bursaries in literature from the Arts Council/An Chomhairle Ealaíona and was elected a member of Aosdána in 2004 and was elected to its governing body An Toscaireacht in 2025.

== Early life and education ==
Jimmy Murphy was born in 1962 to Irish parents in Manchester, England. When he was six, his family returned to Dublin.

He first went to school in nearby Inchicore, attending the Oblate Fathers' primary school there, then moved to Ballyfermot, a working-class heartland of suburban Dublin, in his teens. There, he attended secondary school at St. John's De La Salle College. After failing the Irish Intermediate Certificate, he left school to pursue an apprenticeship in painting and decorating, taking his Junior and Senior Irish Trade Certificates, and the City and Guilds of London exams at the Dublin Institute of Technology, Bolton Street.

== Career ==
Murphy's stage plays include Brothers of the Brush (Dublin, The Peacock, Dublin Theatre Festival 1993), which was awarded best new Irish play; A Picture of Paradise (The Peacock, 1997); The Muesli Belt (Dublin, The Abbey Theatre, 2000); Aceldama (Dublin, Andrews Lane Theatre, 1998), The Kings of the Kilburn High Road (Waterford, Red Kettle Theatre Company, 2000), The Castlecomer Jukebox (Red Kettle, 2004) and What's Left of The Flag (Theatre Upstairs @ The Plough 2010), nominated for an Irish Times Best New Play Award. Murphy's last play, with an all-female cast, The Hen Night Epiphany, premiered at The Focus Theatre, Dublin in September 2011 and was published by Oberon Books. It has recently been translated into Hebrew.

The Kings of the Kilburn High Road was revived on a nationwide tour of Ireland in 2016.

Plays for radio include Mandarin Lime (BBC Radio 4, 1995), Peel’s Brimstone (BBC Radio 4, 1995), and "The Jangle of the Keys" (BBC Radio 4 1997). His awards include The Stewart Parker Award in 1994. The play The Kings of the Kilburn High Road was adapted by Tom Collins as the Irish language film Kings, and was selected as Ireland’s entry for the best foreign-language film for the Academy Awards by the Irish Film and Television Academy.

Three of his plays have been presented at the Acting Irish International Theatre Festival: Brothers of the Brush (2001 Festival, presented by the Tara Players of Winnipeg), The Kings of the Kilburn High Road (2005 Festival, first North American production, presented by the Irish Players of Rochester, and The Muesli Belt (2008 Festival, presented by the Toronto Irish Players).

A one-act play, Perfida, premiered at Theatre Upstairs in July 2012. In October 2012 "The Muesli Belt" received its US premiere at the Banshee Theater, Burbank, CA and in 2013 "The Hen Night Epiphany" received its US premiere at the Wade James Theater, Edmonds WA. In June 2013 a new production of Perfidia was staged by Red Kettle Theatre Company at their new theatre in Waterford. In May 2017 Murphy's second Verbatim piece for the Abbey, looking at police corruption, "A Whisper Anywhere Else", was produced at the Peacock Theatre. His first Verbatim play for the Abbey, "Of This Brave Time", commissioned to commemorate the 1916 Easter Rising, toured the UK in 2016 and later returned to the Peacock stage for a short run.

In August 2018, a new play, Idlewild, was staged at the Smock Alley Theatre in Dublind.

A one-act play, commissioned by Levin' Dred to mark the centenary of the drawing of the Irish border, The Cartographer's Pen, opened at the Town Hall Theatre, Cavan, in May 2022. The following August Decadent Theatre, produced The Chief", a full length play that looked at the last days of Michael Collins.

== Awards ==
- 1994: Stewart Parker Award for best first play
- Three Bursaries in Literature from the Arts Council of Ireland
- 2004: Elected a member of Aosdána

== Works ==
- Brothers of the Brush (Dublin, The Peacock, Dublin Theatre Festival 1993, published London, Oberon Books, 1994), which was awarded best new Irish play
- A Picture of Paradise (The Peacock, 1996, included in The Dazzling Dark, London, Faber&Faber, 1996)
- Aceldama (Black Box Theatre, Dublin, 1998)
- The Muesli Belt (Dublin, The Abbey Theatre, 2000, published in New plays from the Abbey Theatre 1991–2001, Syracuse University Press, 2003)
- The Kings of the Kilburn High Road (Waterford, Red Kettle Theatre Company, 2000, published with Brothers Of The Brush, London, Oberon Books, 2001)
- The Castlecomer Jukebox (Waterford, Red Kettle Theatre 2004)
- What's Left of The Flag (Theatre Upstairs @ The Plough 2010)
- The Hen Night Epiphany (Focus Theatre 2011) published London, Oberon Books
- "Perfidia" (Theatre Upstairs @ Lanigan's 2012)
- "Of This Brave Time" (Peacock Theatre, 2016, Bloomsbury Contemporary Irish Documentary Theatre, 2020)
- "The Kiss" (Theatre Upstairs, 2015)
- "A Whisper Anywhere Else" (Peacock Theatre, 2017)
- "Idlewild" (Smock Alley Theatre, 2018)
- "The Seamster’s Daughter" (Smock Alley Theatre, 2019)
- "The Meadow" (Abbey Theatre, monologue for Dear Ireland series, 2020)
- "Voices From The Bloodied Field/Joe Traynor" (Abbey Theatre, monologue for the Bloody Sunday centenary commemoration, 2020)
- "The Cartographer's Pen" (Ramor Theatre, 2022)
- "The Chief" (Decadent Theatre, 2022)
