= The Kings of the Kilburn High Road =

The Kings of the Kilburn High Road is a play by Irish playwright Jimmy Murphy first produced by Red Kettle Theatre Company at the Garter Lane Theatre Waterford Ireland in 2000. The first American production was staged by the Rochester Community Players of Rochester, New York, in April 2005. The name is an ironic reference to the characters, who frequent the Irish pubs of Kilburn High Road in the Kilburn district of London, an area with a large Irish population.

== The back-story ==
Six young Irish working men immigrate to London in the early 1970s. Like so many of their generation, they spend their lives in manual labour jobs – digging ditches or construction work. They intended to stay only a little while, make some money and return home as successful men, but that day never seemed to arrive. Now, twenty-something years later, still in London, five of them gather in the side room of a pub in an informal wake for one of them who has died. All are in their late-40s or early-50s. All but one (who had split off from the group years earlier and established a successful construction company of his own) are broken from lives of hard work and harder drinking.

The entire play takes place in one afternoon and evening at that pub, as the characters drink to their fallen friend – the only one to make it home, albeit in a coffin. Secrets are revealed and lies are uncovered.

The play was adapted into a film, Kings, directed by Tom Collins, and premiered at the Taormina Film Festival (Italy) June 2006. It was selected as Ireland's official entry for the 2008 Academy Awards for best foreign-language film.
