= Máirín O'Donovan =

- Born: 22 February 1936 (age 90); Mount Merrion, Dublin, Ireland
- Occupations: Actress, singer, dancer
- Parents: Frank O'Donovan; Kitty McMahon

Máirín O'Donovan (born 22 February 1936), is an Irish actress, singer, and dancer. She is best known for her numerous roles in film and television, as well as on stage.

== Early life ==
She was born to Frank O'Donovan and Kitty McMahon, two prominent workers in showbusiness. Her father became well known for portraying the character of Batty Brennan in the long-running soap opera The Riordans, and her uncle was writer and actor Harry O'Donovan. She spent much of her childhood either living with her aunt in Skerries or in a boarding school, as her parents spent much of their time touring. During the summer, however, O'Donovan toured with her parents. Whilst on these tours, she developed a great love for performing.

She married early at age 21, and because of this she gave up performing in order to raise her family. As her children grew up, O'Donovan gradually spent more and more time performing.

== Filmography ==
=== Film ===
Year	Title	Role	Notes
2004	Ella Enchanted	Dancer	Uncredited
2007	Becoming Jane	Dancer	Uncredited
2011	Albert Nobbs	Dancer	Uncredited
2011	This Must Be the Place	Woman in Bank	

=== Television ===
Year	Title	Role	Notes
1994	Thou Shalt Not Kill	Mrs. Mullins	Episode: "The Green Tureen"
2005	Cracking Crime	Sr. Aloysius	Episode: "Mary Kitt"
2006	Marú	Eileen	Episode: "The Browne Case"
2014	Ripper Street	Agatha	Episode: "Your Father. My Friend"
2016	Vikings	Governess	3 episodes

=== Short films ===
Year	Title	Role
2003	Bodyblow	Mourner
2015	69 and Dead	Rita
