= The Gift (2014 film) =

2014 film

- Film poster
- Directed by: Tommy Collins
- Written by: Tommy Collins
- Starring: Michelle Beamish
- Release date: 10 September 2014
- Running time: 113 minutes
- Country: Ireland
- Language: Irish

The Gift (Irish: An Bronntanas) is a 2014 Irish thriller film directed by Tommy Collins. It was selected as the Irish entry for the Best Foreign Language Film at the 87th Academy Awards, but was not nominated.

== Cast ==
- Michelle Beamish as Roisin
- Charlotte Bradley as Carmel Mcgill
- Ciarán Charles as Jack
- Dara Devaney as JJ Magill
- John Finn as Sean Og
- Owen McDonnell as Fiachra Greene
- Pól Ó Griofa as Macdara Magill
- Janusz Sheagall as Jakub Soja

== See also ==
- List of submissions to the 87th Academy Awards for Best Foreign Language Film
- List of Irish submissions for the Academy Award for Best Foreign Language Film
