= 69 and Dead =

- Directed by: Ellen Bytyqi
- Written by: Ellen Bytyqi
- Starring: Emmet Byrne; Máirín O'Donovan; Frank Kelly
- Release date: 8 July 2015
- Running time: 13 minutes
- Country: Ireland
- Language: English

69 and Dead is a 2015 Irish short drama film directed and written by Ellen Bytyki. It was featured in the 2015 Galway Film Fleadh.

The film stars Emmet Byrne as Daniel, a young man who inadvertently causes the death of his grandfather (Frank Kelly) while trying to spice up his grandfather's relationship with his grandmother (Máirín O'Donovan).

== Cast ==
- Emmet Byrne as Daniel
- Máirín O'Donovan as Rita
- Frank Kelly as Eamon
- Irene Byrne as Patricia
- Elisabeth Lloyd as Phyllis
- Jack Maher as Peter
