= Suzy Lawlor =

Irish actress (born 1984)

- Born: Suzy Lawlor; 1984; Ireland
- Occupation: Actress
- Years active: 2005–present

Suzy Lawlor (born 1984) is an Irish actress. She is best known for her role as the lady-in-waiting Anne Parr in the Showtime historical fiction television series The Tudors.

== Early life and theatre career ==
Lawlor pursued her studies in Diploma in Professional Acting in the Gaiety School of Acting for two years, and graduated in June 2005. After graduating, she appeared in the Ian Fitzgibbon-directed TV movie Showbands II produced by Parallel/RTÉ and made her theatre debut in Adrenalin, directed by Karl Shiels, as Boo for Semper Fi Theatre Company at the Dublin Theatre Festival Fringe. Also, she appeared in The Worst Thing directed by Eoghan McLaughlin at Andrew's Lane Studio, God’s Grace directed, again by Karl Shiels for Semper Fi Theatre Company, and also appeared as Bianca in a Second Age production of Othello directed by Alan Stanford and as Miranda in The Tempest directed by Pat Kiernan for the Corcadorca Theatre Company.

For her film career, Lawlor had a minor role in the 2007 film Speed Dating opposite Hugh O'Conor, Alex Reid and Olga Wehrly. In the same year, she appeared as Louise in Garage directed by Lenny Abrahamson for Element Films which was featured in the director's selection at the 2007 Cannes Film Festival. She continued her theatrical appearance as Betty Paris in the acclaimed production of The Crucible directed by Patrick Mason at the Abbey Theatre, Dublin. Lawlor also appeared as Shirley in Inspector George Gently featuring Martin Shaw, directed by Euros Lyn for BBC One. She also appeared in a guest lead (Annie Ward) in Season 6 and Season 7 of RTÉ's The Clinic. She appeared as Anne Parr, both a lady-in-waiting to Catherine Howard and to, Catherine Parr in Showtime's television series The Tudors.

== Awards ==
Lawlor received the Maureen Potter Award in 2004.

== Filmography ==
=== Film ===
Year	Title	Role
2006	Magic	Ashling
2007	Speed Dating	Country girl
2007	Garage	Louise

=== Television ===
Year	Title	Role	Notes
2006	Showbands II	Radio PA	TV movie
2007	Inspector George Gently	Shirley	Episode: "Gently Go Man"
2008	The Clinic	Annie Ward	8 episodes
2010	The Tudors	Anne Parr	9 episodes
