= Max Abrahamson =

Irish lawyer (b. 1932, d. 2018)

- Born: 29 October 1932; Ireland
- Died: 7 October 2018 (aged 85)
- Education: Sandford Park School; Trinity College Dublin
- Occupation: Lawyer
- Employer: Consultant in international construction law
- Known for: Expert in construction law Author of Engineering Law and the ICE Contract; Originator of the "Abrahamson Principles"
- Notable work: Engineering Law and the ICE Contract
- Children: 4 (including Lenny Abrahamson)
- Relatives: Leonard Abrahamson (father); Lenny Abrahamson (son)
- Awards: Max Abrahamson Award (named in his honour)

Max Abrahamson (29 October 1932 – 7 October 2018) was an Irish lawyer, internationally recognized as an expert in construction law.

== Background ==
Abrahamson was the son of Tillie (née Nurock) and surgeon Leonard Abrahamson, whose Jewish families left Eastern Europe around the beginning of the 20th century. His father was a Ukrainian Jew from Odessa. Following his education at Sandford Park School, Dublin, Max Abrahamson entered Trinity College in 1949 where he was elected a Scholar. He qualified as a solicitor in 1955.

== Career ==
There was very little work for lawyers in the very economically depressed Ireland of the 1950s and he supplemented his earnings by lecturing engineering students in contract law in Trinity College. This led to this becoming his area of special expertise. He later lectured at King's College London, and in China. In 1965 he published Engineering Law and the ICE [Institution of Civil Engineers] Contract. It became known as "the engineers' bible" throughout the world.

He later developed the "Abrahamson Principles" first published in 1973. This was a theory to allocate risk in construction contracts. These principles were to become widely used internationally.

Over the course of his career he consulted in over 60 countries. He consulted on major projects in Ireland such as the Jack Lynch Tunnel, the West-Link toll bridge, the International Financial Services Centre and, outside of Ireland, the Heathrow rail tunnel, Eurodisney, the Bahrain Causeway and various projects in Asia and Africa.

== Legal philosophy ==
Abrahamson was a strong proponent of the elimination or narrowing of the distinction between barrister and solicitor, and bemoaned the fact that solicitors had become excessively adversarial. Both of these views stemmed from his belief that the good of the client must come first. A computer buff, he urged solicitors to embrace computing in their work or lose out to those who would.

The Law Society awards the Max Abrahamson Award annually to the student who receives the highest mark in the non-adversarial dispute resolution module of their exams.

== Artistic work ==
Abrahamson sculpted in clay and had bronze works exhibited at the RHA. He also did wood carving in his office to relieve the working day. His masterpiece as a woodcarver was an interpretation of Jacques-Louis David's Napoleon Crossing the Alps.

== Publications ==
- Abrahamson, Max, Engineering Law and the ICE Contract. 1965 (fourth edition, 2003)
- Abrahamson, Max W., "Risk Management" (1983) in International Construction Law Review 241,244.
