= Brothers of the Brush =

Brothers of the Brush is a play by Jimmy Murphy, first produced by the Abbey Theatre at the 1993 Dublin Theatre Festival where it went on to win Best New Play. The play deals with house painters working in the black economy in Ireland in the 1990s.
