= Frank O'Donovan =

Irish actor and singer (1900–1974)

- Born: 10 October 1900; Ireland
- Died: 28 June 1974 (aged 73)
- Occupations: Actor, singer-songwriter
- Television: The Riordans
- Children: Deirdre (b.1928); Máirín (b.1936)

Frank O'Donovan (10 October 1900 – 28 June 1974) was an Irish actor, singer and songwriter. He is best remembered for playing the character of Batty Brennan for 10 years in Ireland's first TV soap, The Riordans.

== Personal life ==
He was born in Dublin, Ireland to a family interested in amateur dramatics, which included his brother Harry O'Donovan. In the 1940s he set up his own acting company and for years toured Ireland and England with the "Frank O'Donovan Show" or the "Dublin Follies".

While on the road he composed and sang songs. In 1940 he recorded "The Road by the River" which was later covered by many singers in Ireland, including Margo O'Donnell who had a hit with it in 1968, and T.R. Dallas. His song "On the One Road" was adopted by the Irish Army as its official song in 1943. Other popular evergreens composed by him were "Sitting on the bridge below the town" and "Little White Cross".

He appeared in the films Murder in Eden (1961), Johnny Nobody (1961), The Quare Fellow (adaptation of Brendan Behan's play, 1962) and Flight of the Doves (1971).

== Family ==
He married the actress Kitty McMahon. They had two daughters together, Deirdre (b. 1928) and Máirín (b. 1936). Máirín O'Donovan became a singer, dancer and actress.

He had 5 grandchildren and 9 great-grandchildren.

== Songs ==
- "The Road by the River"
- "On the One Road"
- "Sitting on the Bridge Below the Town"
- "Little White Cross"
