= Ballyscunnion =

"Ballyscunnion" was an imaginary village located in Ireland, depicted in 285 scraperboard cartoons by the illustrator, painter and comics artist William St. John Glenn RUA. The work was produced on white china scraperboard, painted with black ink and then scraped off with a blade, to produce details.

William St John Glenn was born in 1904, was described as an artist of warmth and gentle humour, and this was present in "Ballyscunnion" as the village came to terms in its own way with the changing world. The work spanned over 30 years and, because the period detail was so accurate, it makes a unique pictorial history of social changes in rural Ireland.

The first reference to "Ballyscunnion" appears in a "wash" drawing published in 1937 in Dublin Opinion - a humorous, pictorial magazine which appeared monthly as light relief from the turbulent period following the birth of the nation. Then from late 1938 "Ballyscunnion" appeared in scraperboard and continued this way until 1969, with a break from mid 1940 till 1946, due to illness and the war. In total there were 285 "Ballyscunnions" produced, some reappearing when Dublin Opinion produced a selection of their drawings in booklets and then again when the magazine released a series of three books, entitled Fifteen Years of Dublin Opinion, Thirty Years of Dublin Opinion and Forty Years of Dublin Opinion.

An exhibition of "Ballyscunnion" drawings was held at the Irish Club in Eaton Square in 1970. The exhibition was opened by Sir Charles Petrie, a military historian and Charles E. Kelly, the former editor of the Dublin Opinion, flew to the event from Ireland. Sir Charles suggested that the "Ballyscunnion" collection should be relocated to the National Gallery in Dublin, stating that "I am sure the likes of this will not be seen again."

William St John Glenn died in Chelsea in 1974.
