= Leonard Abrahamson =

Irish cardiologist (1896–1961)

- Born: Lazar or Lazarus Pandrick; 29 April 1896; Siamiatyčy, Grodno Governorate, Russian Empire
- Died: 29 October 1961 (aged 65); Dublin, Ireland
- Resting place: Dolphins Barn Jewish Cemetery
- Other names: Leonard Eliezer Abrahamson; The Abe
- Education: Trinity College Dublin
- Spouse: Tillie Abrahamson (m. 1920)
- Children: 5, including: Max Abrahamson
- Relatives: Lenny Abrahamson (grandson)

Leonard Eliezer "The Abe" Abrahamson (né Lazar or Lazarus Pandrick; 29 April 1896 – 29 October 1961) was an Irish cardiologist.

== Biography ==
Abrahamson was born either Lazar or Lazarus Pandrick on 29 April 1896 in Siamiatyčy, Grodno Governorate (present-day Siemiatycze, Poland), (Note: Also cited as Odesa.) to Jewish parents David Abrahamson (né Pandrick), a draper, and Frances Abrahamson. (Note: Also cited as Sarah Abrahamson.) Fleeing pogroms, the Abrahamson family emigrated to Newry, County Down, in 1899. The third of four siblings, Abrahamson was the last of his siblings to be born in Siamiatyčy. (Note: Also cited as the second of four siblings.)

Educated at Abbey Christian Brothers' Grammar School, Abrahamson entered Trinity College Dublin in 1914 (Note: Also cited as 1912.) with a double sizarship in Irish and Hebrew. Awarded a foundation scholarship in modern languages in 1915, Abrahamson graduated with a Bachelor's in French and German in 1918. He transferred to the School of Physics and consolidated his medical training with a year's postgraduate study in Paris in 1921.

Abrahamson was appointed as a physician to the staff of Mercer's Hospital in 1920 and then Professor of Materia Medica and Therapeutics in the Royal College of Surgeons in Ireland (RCSI). He published extensively on cardiology, he was a member of the Association of Physicians of Great Britain and Ireland and President of the Biological Society in Trinity College Dublin. He was appointed Professor of Medicine at RCSI in 1934, a chair he held until his death in 1961. The Cardiac Club, founded in 1922 in Oxford, elected Leonard Abrahamson a member in 1934.

Abrahamson was President of the Royal College of Physicians in Ireland (1949), having earlier (1941) been appointed to the first board of the House of Industry hospitals by Seán MacEntee.

Abrahamson attended Bill Beckett, father of Samuel Beckett, on the day of his death from a heart attack on 26 June 1933.

== Personal life ==
In 1920, Abrahamson married Tillie Abrahamson (née Nurock). The couple had one daughter and four sons, including the solicitor and lecturer Max Abrahamson. The brother-in-law of the Irish–Israeli ambassador Max Nurock, Abrahamson was the grandfather of the film director Lenny Abrahamson.

On 29 October 1961, Abrahamson died at his home in Dublin, aged 65. Abrahamson was buried at the Dolphins Barn Jewish Cemetery.
