= Dublin Opinion =

Irish satirical magazine published 1922-1968

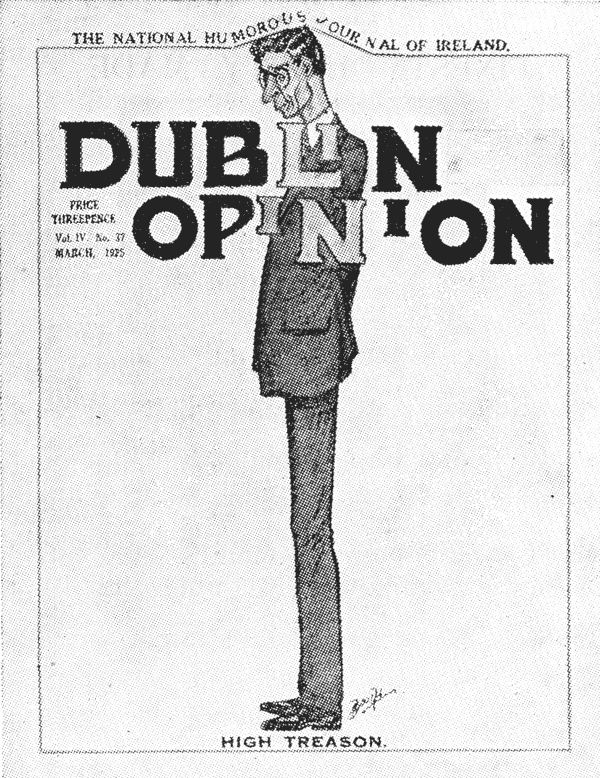
- Cover to Dublin Opinion Vol. IV No. 37, March 1926, caricaturing Éamon de Valera, by Arthur Booth
- Former editors: Arthur Booth; Charles E. Kelly; Thomas J. Collins; Lelia Doolan; Joe Dowling
- Categories: Satire
- Frequency: Monthly
- Publisher: Dublin Opinion Ltd.
- First issue: 1 March 1922
- Final issue: 1968
- Country: Ireland
- Based in: Dublin
- Language: English

Dublin Opinion was an Irish satirical magazine, published monthly from 1922 to 1968. It was founded by cartoonists Arthur Booth and Charles E. Kelly and writer Thomas J. Collins. Booth was its first editor, and drew the covers of the early issues. The first issue was launched on 1 March 1922, and its entire print run of 3,000 sold out. The next issue sold poorly, but from the third issue the magazine was distributed by Eason & Son and sales improved, rising to 40,000 per issue within four years, and 60,000 at its peak.

Launched on the eve of the Irish Civil War, the magazine's editorial stance was carefully balanced between Free Staters and Republicans, and its satire was generally gentle, albeit less so when it came to Britain and northern Unionists. Booth's cartoons were sombre, focusing on the destruction caused by the war and the unemployment that followed, while Kelly's were more playful. Collins wrote most of the text pieces under a variety of pseudonyms, including Paul Jones, Clement Molyneaux, Lycurgus and Epictetus. After Booth's death in 1928, Kelly and Collins took over as joint editors.

Dublin Opinion was a showcase for Irish cartooning, including Bill Glenn's regular "Ballyscunnion" scraperboard cartoon, and work by W. H. Conn, Rowel Friers, Grace Gifford and many others, but by the mid-1960s, its popularity had begun to wane. Kelly and Collins wound up the magazine in 1967 and sold it to Louis O'Sullivan in 1968, under whose ownership it returned briefly, edited by Lelia Doolan and Joe Dowling.
