= The Deportees and Other Stories =

2007 short story collection by Roddy Doyle

- First edition (UK)
- Author: Roddy Doyle
- Cover artist: Marcus Lyon (photo); Stephen Parker (design)
- Language: English
- Genre: Short stories
- Publisher: Jonathan Cape (UK); Viking (US); Knopf Canada
- Publication date: 2007
- Publication place: Ireland
- Media type: Print & eBook
- Pages: 242
- ISBN: 0-224-08061-X

The Deportees and Other Stories is the first short story collection by Irish writer Roddy Doyle first published by Jonathan Cape in 2007. All the stories were written for Metro Éireann, a multicultural paper aimed at Ireland's immigrant population and explore their experiences. The stories were written in 800 word chapters and published monthly; as Doyle explains in the foreword to the book:

The stories have never been carefully planned. I send off a chapter to the Metro Eireann editor Chinedu Onyejelem, and, often, I haven't a clue what's going to happen next, And I don't care too much, until the deadline begin's to tap me on the shoulder. It's a fresh, small terror, once a month. I live a very quiet life; I love that monthly terror.

== Stories ==
- "Guess Who's Coming for the Dinner", a reworking of the 1967 film Guess Who's Coming to Dinner, it concerns a father forced to confront his prejudices when his daughter brings a Nigerian male friend home to dinner
- "The Deportees", a follow-up to The Commitments finds Jimmy Rabbitte, now 36, married with young children forming a new band - this time "no white Irish need apply" and you're out if you like the Corrs. They end up playing Woody Guthrie songs at an Indian 21st birthday party
- "New Boy", a refugee from Rwanda's first day in an Irish school
- "57% Irish", about a doctoral student who devises an 'Irishness' test for immigrants based around responses to disparate Irish imagery including Roy Keane goals and Riverdance
- "Black Hoodie", three teenagers investigate racial profiling in in-store security but get arrested for shop-lifting
- "The Pram", a Polish au pair plots revenge on the family who have treated her so badly
- "Home to Harlem", a quarter black student moves to New York to research how the Harlem Renaissance influenced Irish literature and to search for his black grandfather.
- "I Understand", a Nigerian illegal immigrant is threatened by drug dealers (online text)

== Reception ==
- Tim Martin writing in The Independent was surprised at the collections wide range but remarked that some of the stories appeared understandably rushed. He praised its sincerity and 'good cheer'.
- Ian Sansom in The Guardian wrote "The stories are often very funny and rumbustious...When these stories are good, and they often are, they're absolutely hilarious".
- Erica Wagner in The New York Times said "Doyle wrote them in response to the urban legends he’d started to hear about his country’s newest inhabitants: Muslims slaughtering sheep in their backyards, a Polish woman who turns her flat into a brothel. In reacting to such squalid stories, Doyle sometimes goes too far in the opposite direction, and at first it might seem as if there’s something rose-tinted about the view he wants to take...the optimism can seem forced. Sad to acknowledge, perhaps, that it’s the darker stories that work best."
- Cressida Connelly ends her review in The Spectator with "The Deportees may not be Doyle at his very best, but it’s still a highly enjoyable read".

== Adaptations ==
- "Guess Who's Coming for the Dinner" first appeared as a 75-minute play performed at Dublin's Andrews Lane Theatre in 2001 as part of the Dublin Theatre Festival, it starring Gary Cooke as the father and Maynard Eziashi as the Nigerian.
- "New Boy" was adapted into a short film in 2007 which was nominated for an Academy Award for Best Live Action Short Film the following year and won several other awards
  - Best Irish Short Film - Foyle Film Festival
  - Best Short Film - Irish Film and Television Awards
  - Best Short Film - Tribeca Film Festival
  - Best Short Film - Vail Film Festival
