= Kings (2007 film) =

- DVD cover
- Directed by: Tom Collins
- Written by: Tom Collins
- Based on: The Kings of the Kilburn High Road by Jimmy Murphy
- Produced by: Tom Collins; Jackie Larkin
- Starring: Colm Meaney; Donal O'Kelly; Brendan Conroy; Donncha Crowley
- Cinematography: P. J. Dillon
- Edited by: Dermot Diskin
- Music by: Pol Brennan
- Distributed by: High Point Film and Television Ltd
- Release date: 21 September 2007
- Running time: 88 minutes
- Country: Ireland
- Languages: Irish; English

Kings is a 2007 Irish film written and directed by Tom Collins and based on Jimmy Murphy's play The Kings of the Kilburn High Road. The film is bilingual, having both Irish and English dialogue. It premiered at the Taormina Film Festival (Italy) in June 2007, and was selected as Ireland's official entry for the 2008 Academy Awards in the best foreign-language film category. The film tells the story of a group of Irish friends who, after emigrating to England 30 years previously, meet for the funeral of a friend. In 2008, the Irish postal service, An Post, issued a series of stamps honouring the Irish film industry. Colm Meaney, as Joe Mullan, was featured on the 55 cent stamp.

== Plot ==
In the mid-1970s a group of young men leave the Connemara Gaeltacht, bound for London and filled with ambition for a better life. After thirty years, they meet again at the funeral of their youngest friend, Jackie. The film intersperses flashbacks of a lost youth in Ireland with the harsh realities of modern life.

For some the thirty years has been hard, working in building sites across Britain. Slowly the truth about Jackie's death become clear and the friends discover they need each other more than ever. However, by the end, the friends split up for good, going their separate ways.

== Cast ==
Actor	Role
Colm Meaney	Joe Mullan
Donal O'Kelly	Jap Kavanagh
Brendan Conroy	Git Miller
Donncha Crowley	Shay Mulligan
Barry Barnes	Máirtín Rogers
Seán Ó Tarpaigh	Jackie Flaherty
Seán T. Ó Meallaigh	Joe Jnr
Christopher Greene	Jap Jnr
Graham Feeley	Git Jnr
Simon Drislane	Shay Jnr
Darragh O'Brien	Máirtín Jnr
Ronan Moloney	Jackie Jnr
Peadar Ó Treasaigh	Micil Flaherty
Cathy Murphy	Bridie
Gabrielle Reidy	Maggie
Des McAleer	Fr. Maguire
Dimitri Andreas	Dursun
Gerry Doherty	Pawnbroker

== Awards ==
In 2007, Tom Collins won the Directors Guild of America / Ireland New Finders Award. The film itself was nominated for a record 14 Irish Film and Television Awards (IFTAs) in 2008, – going on to win 5 IFTAs, including Best Irish Language Film

IFTA Awards (2008)-

Won –

- Best Actor in a Supporting Role in a Feature Film – Brendan Conroy
- Best Editing – Dermot Diskin
- Best Original Score – Pol Brennan
- Best Sound – Ken Galvin, Ronan Hill, Dominic Weaver
- Special Irish Language Award

Nominated –

- Best Actor in a Lead Role in a Feature Film – Colm Meaney
- Best Actor in a Supporting Role in a Feature Film – Donal O'Kelly
- Best Costume Design – Maggie Donnelly
- Best Director of Photography – P.J. Dillon
- Best Hair & Make-Up – Muriel Bell, Pamela Smyth
- Best Production Design – David Craig
- Best Director for Film – Tom Collins
- Best Script for Film – Tom Collins
- Best Film – Jackie Larkin, Tom Collins
