= Arthur Booth (cricketer, born 1926) =

British cricketer

Arthur Booth (8 January 1926 – 12 September 2004) was an English cricketer who played for Lancashire County Cricket Club in the early 1950s.

Booth was born at Droylsden in Lancashire in 1926. He played Central Lancashire League cricket for Ashton Cricket Club, first played for Lancashire's Second XI in 1949, and went on to make his first-class debut the following season. He played four matches for the county First XI, three of which came in 1951. Playing as a right-handed batsman, Booth scored a total of 81 runs with a highest score of 49 in his four first-class matches.

In 1950 Booth had scored 253 runs for Lancashire Second XI against Lincolnshire in the Minor Counties Cricket Championship, setting a new county Second XI record. He played in the county Second XI until 1953 and later played was the club professional at Dukinfield and Haslingden Cricket Clubs.

Booth died at Dobcross in Lancashire in 2004. He was aged 78.
