= Tommy Collins (filmmaker) =

Irish filmmaker (died 2022)

- Born: Derry, Northern Ireland
- Died: July 2022
- Other name: Tom Collins
- Occupations: Director, film maker
- Years active: 1986-2018
- Notable work: Teenage Kicks – The Undertones (2006), Kings (2007), An Bronntanas (2014), Penance (2018)

Tommy Collins (died July 2022), sometimes referred to as Tom Collins, was an Irish filmmaker. Two of Collins's Irish language works (Kings and The Gift) have been Ireland's entries into the Foreign Language Films category at the Academy Awards.

== Career ==
Collins' broadcast career began as the photographer on the documentary Mother Ireland (1986), which won a Femme Cathodique Cinematography award.

His later works include Hush-a-Bye Baby (1989) (producer) with Sinéad O'Connor and Emer McCourt, The Bishop's Story (1994) (co-producer) with Donal McCann, Bogwoman (1997) (director) with Rachael Dowling and Peter Mullan, and Dead Long Enough (2006) (director) with Michael Sheen.

He also wrote and directed Teenage Kicks – The Undertones (2006), a "rockumentary" on the Derry band The Undertones. He also produced or directed a number of other documentaries including More than a Sacrifice (1996), First Love (1997), Le Choix d'une mère (1998), A Mother's Story (1999), The Johnie Walker Story and Donal McCann — It Must Be Done Right (2000). He directed The Boys of St Columb's, a documentary for BBC and RTÉ in 2009.

In 2007 his film Kings, which tells the story of a group of young men who left the west of Ireland in 1977 for London, was entered as Ireland's choice for Oscar nomination. Kings was placed in the Best Foreign Language Film category as it was filmed in the Irish language. The film stars Colm Meaney, Brendan Conroy, Donal O'Kelly, Donnacha Crowley and Sean O'Tarpaigh. Kings was nominated for a record 14 awards at the 2008 Irish Film and Television Awards; won the Gold Torc at the 2008 Celtic Film and Media Awards; picked up a Special Commendation at Prix Europa Best Drama 2008; won Best Cinematography Award at the Hamptons Film Festival 2007; was awarded Best Film at the Westchester Film Festival 2007 and was awarded Special Commendation Foyle Film Festival 2007.

He subsequently directed a documentary on the British Education Act (Northern Ireland) 1947, which led to free secondary education in Northern Ireland. The film, called The Boys of St Columb's and released in 2009, featured Seamus Heaney, Seamus Deane and John Hume.

In 2014 he produced and directed An Bronntanas ("The Gift") for Irish Film Board, Northern Irish screen, TG4 and the Broadcast Authority of Ireland.

Collins subsequently produced Penance (2018), which was distributed by Cinema Epooque.

== Early and personal life ==
Brought up in Derry in Northern Ireland, Collins received an M.A.(Hons.) from Dublin City University.

Collins died from cancer in July 2022.
