= W. H. Conn =

Irish cartoonist

- "The Dance in the Old Dublin House", illustration from Dublin Opinion magazine, pre-1937
- Born: William H. Conn; 1895; Belfast, Ireland
- Died: 25 August 1973 (aged 77–78)
- Known for: Cartooning, illustration, watercolours, posters

William H. Conn (1895–1973) was an Irish cartoonist, illustrator, watercolourist and poster artist. The son of a lithographer, he was educated at the Ulster Provincial School, now Friends' School, Lisburn. From 1936 he was a staff artist for the Belfast Telegraph and its sports sister paper Ireland's Saturday Night, creating a regular strip, "The Doings of Larry O'Hooligan", for the latter. He drew a monthly full-page illustration (two pages in the Christmas edition) for Dublin Opinion magazine, sometimes satirical, sometimes observational scenes of rural and urban Irish life, sometimes ghostly gothic scenes, and also contributed spot cartoons. He created colour posters for Northern Ireland Railways and exhibited his watercolours and black and white drawings.

Conn was a member of the Ulster Arts Club. His work was featured in an exhibition at the Ulster Arts Club in 1933 and at the Royal Hibernian Academy from 1934 to 1935.

He died on 25 August 1973 after a three-year illness. He was a lifelong bachelor.
