= Scope (Irish TV series) =

Irish science television series

SCOPE was a science television series produced in conjunction with Irish broadcaster Raidió Teilifís Éireann (RTÉ). Each show was a 25-minute, fast moving 'MTV’-style programme targeting young people. It aimed to interest young people in science and engineering and to give a wide perspective on the range of careers available in these areas.

The 2007 series was the fourth in successive years and visited a wide range of locations, from Dublin to Las Vegas, Nevada. It covered topics such as ecological footprints, sleep deprivation, gravity and the science of laughter.

SCOPE was an initiative of the Discover Science & Engineering (DSE) awareness programme, which is managed by Forfás on behalf of the Office of Science and Technology at the Department Jobs, Enterprise and Innovation.
