= Lenny Abrahamson =

Irish film director and screenwriter

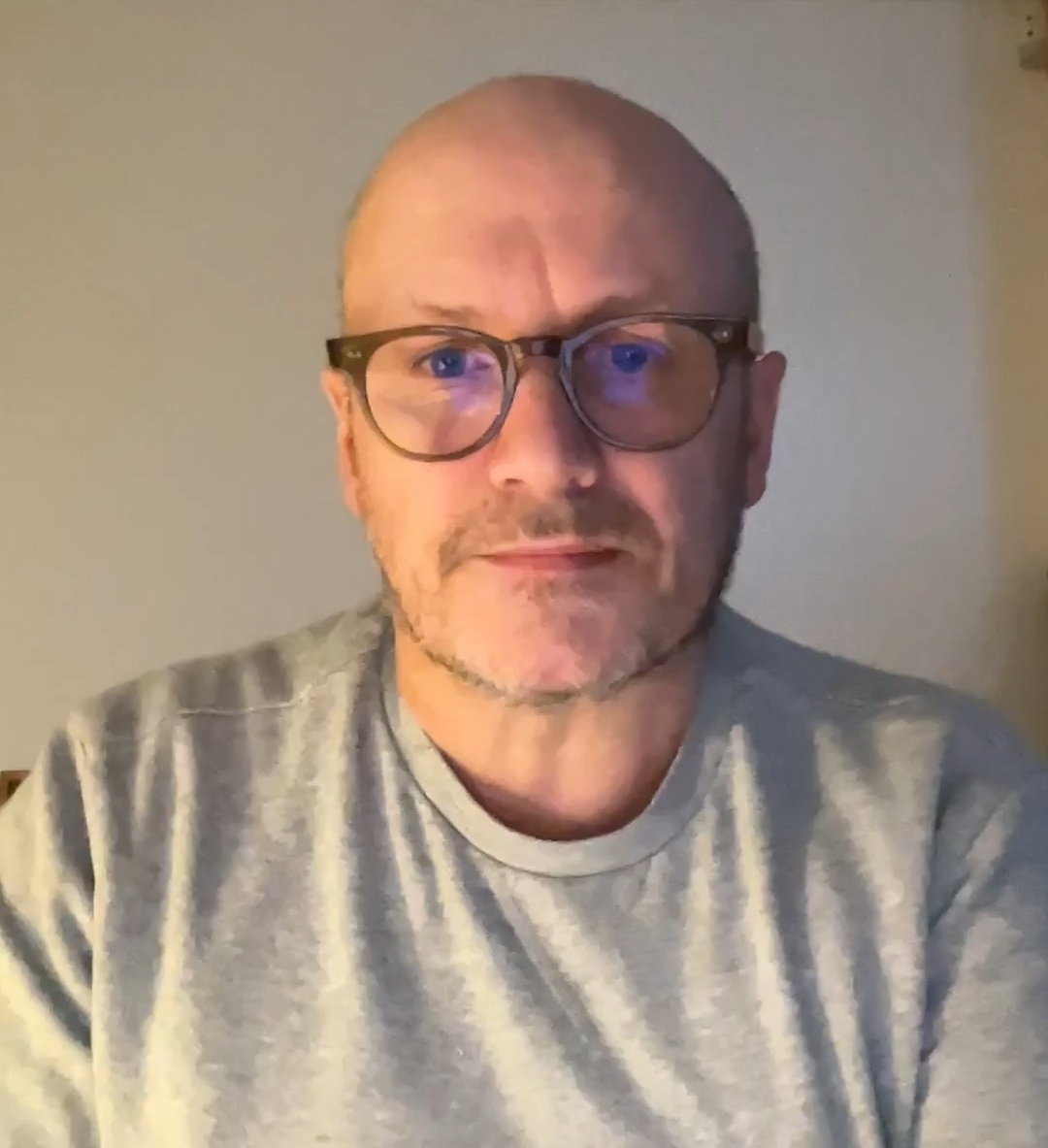
- Abrahamson in 2024
- Born: Leonard Ian Abrahamson; 30 November 1966 (age 59); Rathfarnham, Dublin, Ireland
- Education: Trinity College Dublin
- Occupations: Film director; television director
- Years active: 1991–present
- Notable work: Room (2015); Normal People (2020)
- Spouse: Monika Pamula
- Children: 2
- Father: Max Abrahamson
- Relatives: Leonard Abrahamson (grandfather)

Leonard Ian Abrahamson (born 30 November 1966) is an Irish film and television director. He is best known for directing the independent films Adam & Paul (2004), Garage (2007), What Richard Did (2012), Frank (2014), and Room (2015), all of which contributed to Abrahamson's six Irish Film and Television Awards.

In 2015, he received widespread recognition for Room, based on Emma Donoghue's novel of the same name. The film received four nominations at the 88th Academy Awards, including Best Picture and Best Director. In 2020, Abrahamson directed six episodes of and executive produced the television series Normal People, for which he was nominated for the Primetime Emmy Award for Outstanding Directing for a Limited Series.

== Early life and education ==
Abrahamson was born in Rathfarnham, Dublin, the son of Jewish parents Edna (née Walzman) and Max Abrahamson, a solicitor. Although his upbringing was not devoutly religious, his family belonged to an Orthodox synagogue, and he had a bar mitzvah ceremony and attended a cheder. Both sides of his family were originally from Eastern Europe; his maternal grandparents were Polish Jews who settled in Ireland in the 1930s, while his paternal grandfather, after whom he was named, was Leonard Abrahamson, a Ukrainian Jew from Odesa. Abrahamson's grandmother was a childhood friend of future President of Israel Chaim Herzog; both were the children of Jewish immigrants to Ireland and grew up on Bloomfield Avenue in Portobello.

Abrahamson was educated at The High School and Trinity College Dublin, where he was elected a scholar in philosophy in 1988, having transferred after studying theoretical physics for a year.

== Career ==
Abrahamson was offered a scholarship to study for a PhD in philosophy at Stanford University. He abandoned his studies after six months and returned to Ireland to take up filmmaking, initially directing commercials, including a popular series of adverts for Carlsberg. His first film was Adam & Paul, a black comedy about a pair of heroin addicts making their way around Dublin in search of a fix. His next film was 2007's Garage, starring Pat Shortt as a lonely petrol station attendant in rural Ireland. Both films won the IFTA award for best film.

Also in 2007, RTÉ screened Abrahamson's four-part TV miniseries Prosperity, written in collaboration with Mark O'Halloran, the co-writer of Adam and Paul and Garage. Like those two films, Prosperity depicts people on the fringes of Irish society, with each one-hour episode focusing on a specific character, including an alcoholic, a single mother, and an asylum seeker. Prosperity was nominated for six Irish Film and Television Awards in 2008 and won in two categories, Best Directing for Abrahamson and Best Script for O'Halloran.

In 2012, Abrahamson won his third IFTA for best film with What Richard Did.

In a December 2012 interview with Eurochannel, Abrahamson said he was working on a film called Frank, set in Britain, Ireland, and the United States, saying: "It's a comedy about a young musician who joins an eccentric band led by an enigmatic singer called Frank. It's a kind of road movie, strange, funny and quite original, I hope. It stars Michael Fassbender and Domhnall Gleeson." Frank premiered at the Sundance Film Festival in January 2014. It is about an eccentric musician modeled after Frank Sidebottom. It stars Michael Fassbender, Domhnall Gleeson and Maggie Gyllenhaal.

Abrahamson next directed the film adaptation of Emma Donoghue's novel Room (2015), for which he received his first Academy Award nomination. The film was successful, both critically and commercially.

In 2014, it was announced that Abrahamson would direct an adaptation of Laird Hunt's Civil War novel Neverhome. In 2015, Abrahamson was working on A Man's World, a film based on Emile Griffith's boxing rivalry with Benny Paret.

In 2016, it was confirmed that Abrahamson was attached to direct an adaptation of Neal Bascomb's book The Grand Escape, a true story about three daredevil World War I pilots held in Germany's most infamous POW prison. The story chronicles the war's greatest mass prison escape and the pilots' subsequent flight to freedom. A writer to adapt the book has not yet been attached. Element Pictures and Film4 Productions are producing.

== Personal life ==
Abrahamson is married to Monika Pamula, a Polish-born film studies teacher; the couple have two children.

Abrahamson is an atheist.

== Filmography ==
Short film

- 3 Joes (1991) (Also story writer)

Feature film

- Adam & Paul (2004)
- Garage (2007)
- Dublin 26.06.08: A Movie in 4 Days (2008)
- What Richard Did (2012)
- Frank (2014)
- Room (2015)
- The Little Stranger (2018)

TV series

Year	Title	Director	Executive Producer	Notes
2007	Prosperity	Yes	No	All 4 episodes
2016	Chance	Yes	Yes	2 episodes
2020	Normal People	Yes	Yes	6 episodes
2022	Conversations with Friends	Yes	Yes	7 episodes

Commercials

- AIB (2006)
- Carlsberg (2006)
- Meteor (2009)
- The Real Cost (2024)

== Awards and nominations ==
Academy Awards

- Best Director – Room (2015) — Nominated

British Academy Television Awards

- British Academy Television Award for Best Mini-Series – Normal People - Nominated

British Academy Television Craft Awards

- British Academy Television Craft Award for Best Director: Fiction – Normal People - Nominated

Primetime Emmy Awards

- Outstanding Directing for a Limited Series, Movie, or Dramatic Special – Normal People: "Episode 5" (2020) — Nominated

Irish Film & Television Awards

- Best Director for Film – Adam & Paul (2004) Winner
- Best Director for Film – Garage (2007) Winner
- Best Director for Film – What Richard Did (2012) Winner
- Best Director for Television – Prosperity (2007) Winner
- Best Director for Television – Normal People (2020) Winner
- Best Director for Television – ‘’Conversations with Friends’’ (2022) Winner

Cannes Film Festival

- C.I.C.A.E. – Garage (2007)

Satellite Awards

- Best Director – Room — (2015) Nominated

== See also ==
- List of Irish film directors
- List of Academy Award winners and nominees from Ireland
