= Yu Ming Is Ainm Dom =

- Directed by: Daniel O’Hara
- Starring: Diyu Daniel Wu; Frank Kelly; Paddy C. Courtney; Richard Morton
- Release date: 2003
- Running time: 13 minutes
- Country: Ireland
- Languages: Irish; English; Chinese

Yu Ming Is Ainm Dom (My Name Is Yu Ming) (Chinese: 我的名字是于明) is a 2003 Irish short film. Filmed largely in the Irish language, it tells the tale of a Chinese man who has learned to speak Irish but cannot be understood when he comes to visit largely English-speaking Ireland. It was directed by Daniel O'Hara and runs 13 minutes long. It is often featured as a studied text on the Irish Leaving Certificate.

== Plot ==
Bored with his mundane life in China, shopworker Yu Ming (Diyu Daniel Wu) decides to move to a random country and picks Ireland by spinning a globe in a library. An atlas informs him that the official language of Ireland is Irish Gaelic, thus he begins to learn Irish before his trip. Yu Ming continues practicing his Irish skills throughout his day, such as while eating and shaving, for the next six months. Eventually, Yu Ming is able to quote movie scenes in Irish such as "An bhfuil tusa ag labhairt liomsa?" ("Are you talking to me?").

Yu Ming finally arrives in Dublin and is able to get around by reading the bilingual signs. After some sightseeing, Yu Ming arrives at a hostel and says "Ba mhaith liom leaba anseo" ("I would like a bed here"). The receptionist, an Australian, assumes that Yu Ming is speaking Chinese and asks an Asian co-worker, Enke, to help translate. Enke says, "I am Mongolian." Eventually, Enke tells the receptionist that Yu Ming is probably looking for a room at the hostel. Later that day in a restaurant, Yu Ming has considerable difficulty eating with a knife and fork, instead choosing to use them like chopsticks. A disheartened Yu Ming walks the streets of Dublin, coming to rest next to a statue of Patrick Kavanagh, to whom he says "An bhfuil tusa ag labhairt liomsa?".

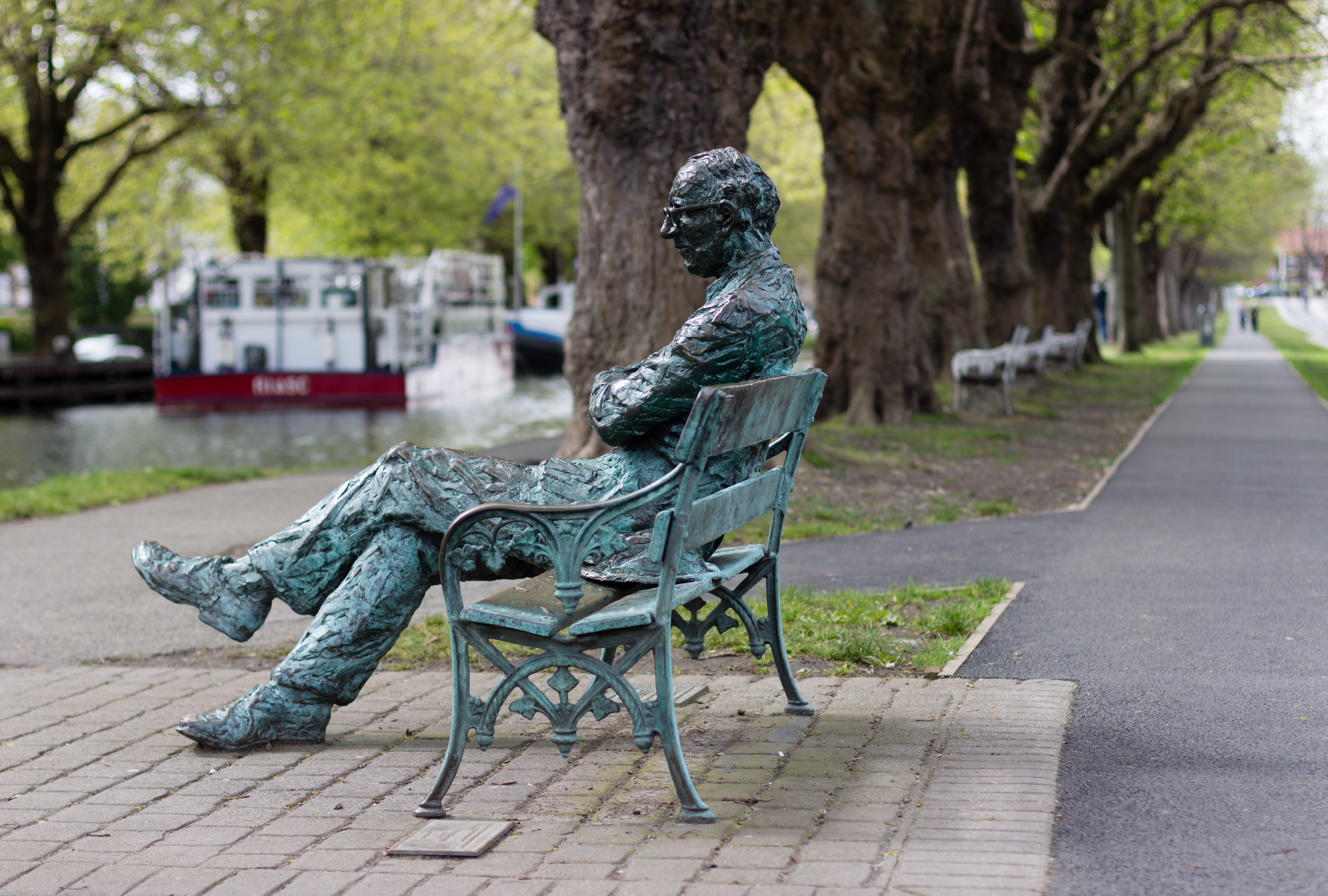
Patrick Kavanagh statue next to which Yu Ming sits.

Later, Yu Ming heads to a bar in order to seek work, and again his Irish lets him down. He tells the barman, "Tá mé ag lorg obair" ("I am looking for work") to which the barman stares blankly at him, not understanding a word. An elderly Irish speaker named Paddy (Frank Kelly) sits at the end of the bar listening in awe at Yu Ming speaking near fluent Irish and invites him for a drink. Yu Ming tells him that he thinks his Irish studies were in vain as since nobody understands him he thinks he is terrible at it. Paddy tells Yu Ming that the contrary is true and that Yu Ming speaks Irish better than most people in Ireland. Paddy explains that English is the dominant language of Ireland and that Irish is only spoken in a small number of areas. The two confused bartenders watch in awe as they believe Paddy and Yu Ming are speaking Chinese and not Irish, with the barman asking "Did you know oul' Paddy could speak Chinese?"

Yu Ming is later shown to have found a job working as a bartender in the Gaeltacht (Irish-speaking) area of Connemara.

== Cast ==
- Diyu Daniel Wu as Yu Ming
- Frank Kelly as Paddy
- Paddy C. Courtney as a barman
- Richard Morton as Lenny

== Awards ==
The film received several awards, including Best International Comedy at the Aspen Shortsfest (2004) and Best Irish Language Production at the Irish Film & Television Awards (2004).
