= Prosperity (Irish TV series) =

- Genre: Drama
- Created by: Mark O'Halloran
- Directed by: Lenny Abrahamson
- Country of origin: Ireland
- Original language: English
- No. of seasons: 1
- No. of episodes: 4

Production
- Producers: Ed Guiney; Catherine Magee
- Production location: Dublin
- Running time: 60 minutes

Original release
- Network: RTÉ Two
- Release: September 3, 2007

Related
- Bachelors Walk; Pure Mule

Prosperity is a series of four one-hour dramas for television from director Lenny Abrahamson and writer Mark O'Halloran. Prosperity features "four powerful, moving and funny stories set on the same day, with each episode examining the life of a single character." The series first aired on 3 September 2007 on RTÉ, and was produced by Ed Guiney and Catherine Magee for Element Films.

The series was nominated for six Irish Film and Television Awards in 2008, and won two, for Directing (Lenny Abrahamson) and Script (Mark O'Halloran).

== Stacey ==
Stacey is a 17-year-old mother of one. Stacey came from a bad background of drugs, alcohol and violence in her home. She moved out after conditions in her home became unbearable. She is currently living temporarily in an "emergency" B&B housing. Stacy has a tenuous relationship with the father of her 3-month-old daughter Lorna, Dean, who lives at home. Dean avoids responsibility of Stacey and Lorna but is content on using Stacey whenever he wants.

== Gavin ==
Gavin is a 14-year-old who lives with his Mam and younger sister, Nadine. He has a very bad stutter, which has led him to be mocked and bullied by the other boys. He has poor attendance record at school and his mother works long hours in a nearby factory, leaving him unattended most of the time. His father, Jerome, left him when he was two, and he rarely sees his father. His father also has a baby with a younger woman. Gavin's friend, Conor, is taken advantage of by Gavin from making him skip school with him, to convincing him to steal a rabbit.

== Georgie ==
Georgie is a 42-year-old Dubliner who lives with his aging mother and has a son Georgie Jr. He is unemployed for 11 months and used to work in a small upholstery workshop. Georgie Jr. lives with his mother Tina and her partner Victor. At the beginning of the day he finds out his social welfare is cut off as he hasn't been seeking employment. He then tries to get his old job back and fails. Over the course of the day he drinks several cans of beer; alone on park benches, in front of his old employer and in the company of his young son. He also spends the last of his money on slot machines. When he collects Georgie Jnr. from school he asks him for money to buy more drink. When Georgie brings his son back to Tinas home he launches an unprovoked attack on Victor and appears to break Victors nose.

== Pala ==
Pala Lolonga, 31, is Nigerian but was granted permission to live in Ireland as an asylum-seeker. Pala is widowed, and her son Joseph, 10, was not granted permission into Ireland, so lives with his grandmother in Nigeria. She hopes this will be overturned as she misses her son terribly. Pala suffers badly from isolation as she barely knows anyone. She works overnight for a small Irish company cleaning offices, and sends as much money to Joseph and his grandmother as possible.
