= Arthur Booth (cartoonist) =

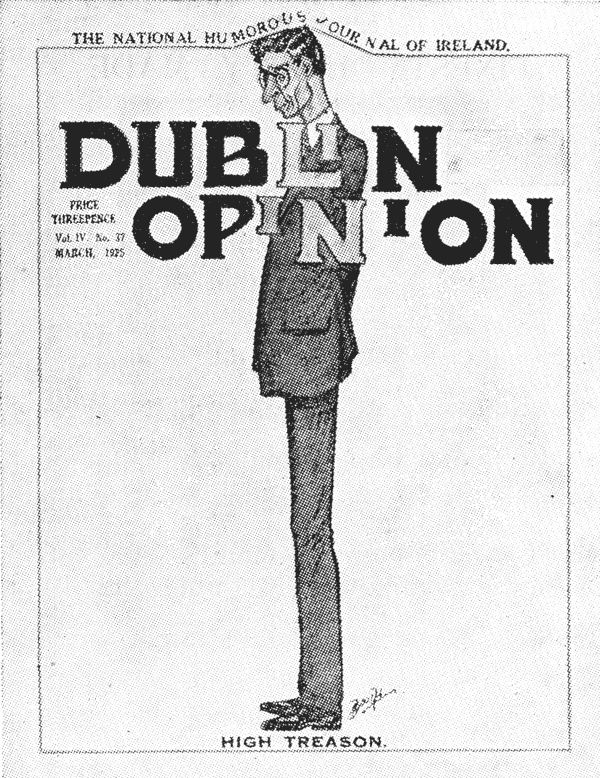
- Arthur Booth's caricature of Éamon de Valera, Dublin Opinion Vol. IV No. 37, March 1926
- Born: Arthur James Conry Booth; 24 September 1892; Dublin
- Died: 8 October 1926 (aged 34); Dublin
- Known for: Cartooning

Arthur James Conry Booth (1892–1926) was an Irish cartoonist and one of the founders of the satirical magazine Dublin Opinion. Born in Dublin, he was educated at the Catholic University School and joined the Dublin United Transport Company. Through his interest in amateur dramatics, he met fellow cartoonist Charles E. Kelly and writer Thomas J. Collins, and decided to start a humorous journal. Booth resigned his job to become editor, and drew the covers as well as interior cartoons.

Dublin Opinion was launched on 1 March 1922, on the eve of the Irish Civil War, and within four years it was selling 40,000 per issue. Booths cartoons tended to be sombre, concentrating on the destruction caused by the Civil War and the unemployment that followed. He died of pneumonia at the age of 33, leaving a widow and three children. Thereafter, Kelly and Collins became joint editors of Dublin Opinion.
