= Inside I'm Dancing =

2004 Irish film by Damien O'Donnell

- Theatrical release poster
- Directed by: Damien O'Donnell
- Screenplay by: Jeffrey Caine
- Story by: Christian O'Reilly
- Produced by: James Flynn; Juanita Wilson
- Starring: James McAvoy; Steven Robertson; Romola Garai; Brenda Fricker
- Cinematography: Peter Robertson
- Edited by: Fran Parker
- Music by: David Julyan
- Production companies: Universal Pictures; StudioCanal; Working Title Films; Bord Scannán na hÉireann/Irish Film Board; WT^{2} Productions
- Distributed by: Momentum Pictures; Universal Pictures (United Kingdom and Ireland)
- Release date: 15 October 2004 (Ireland/UK)
- Running time: 104 minutes
- Countries: Ireland; United Kingdom
- Language: English
- Box office: $1.2 million

Inside I'm Dancing (released as Rory O'Shea Was Here in some regions), is a 2004 comedy-drama film directed by Damien O'Donnell; written by Jeffrey Caine and Christian O'Reilly; and starring James McAvoy, Steven Robertson, Romola Garai, and Brenda Fricker.

The film revolves around two disabled young men who pursue physical and emotional independence in direct defiance of "protective" institutional living and their society's prevailing standards and attitudes, especially pity.

The production was filmed in Dublin and Wicklow and involved production companies Working Title Films and StudioCanal with assistance from the Irish Film Board (Bord Scannán na hÉireann).

== Plot ==
Michael Connolly is a 24-year-old with cerebral palsy who is a long-term resident of the Carrigmore Residential Home for the Disabled run by the formidable Eileen. His life, mundane and schedule-driven by the institution's authorities, is transformed when the maverick Rory O'Shea, who suffers from Duchenne muscular dystrophy, suddenly moves in. Michael is stunned to discover that fast talking Rory, prone to lewd and/or overt jokes at unpredictable intervals, and who can move only his right hand, can understand his almost unintelligible speech. Rory's dynamic and rebellious nature soon sparks a flame in Michael, introducing him to the wider world outside of Carrigmore.

On a day out in Dublin led by Carrigmore collecting for "the needs of the disabled", Rory leads Michael astray, sneaking off to a local pub with their donation bucket, charming a group of girls at a corner table at which sits Siobhán; later they see Siobhán again while traversing a neighbouring nightclub, which they get into only by Michael citing Irish and EU Disability Discrimination Law text to the bouncer.

Rory has meanwhile repeatedly failed in his application for the Independent Living Allowance; he is always denied that on the grounds of irresponsibility and poor judgement, but told to reapply in six months. Inspired by his example Michael applies for the allowance himself; with the help of Rory as his interpreter Michael gets the allowance but they struggle to find an apartment that is both wheelchair accessible and affordable. Rory convinces Michael to visit his estranged father who, out of guilt, gives them the money and property they need to set up on their own.

They interview for a care-giver with little success, but later they meet Siobhán working in a local supermarket, and try to convince her to take on the job. Despite not having any professional experience she reluctantly accepts. Seeing that Michael and Siobhán are platonically friendly to each other, Rory becomes jealous – culminating in a joyride with local kids in a stolen car, crashing it, subsequently getting briefly detained by the police.

Siobhán invites Rory and Michael along to a costume party; but after Siobhán rejects Michaels advances she decides to bring in Peter, a qualified Personal Assistant to replace herself. Michael is distraught over Siobhán's departure from their lives, and considering suicide; Rory finds him on the edge of the James Joyce Bridge. Michael jokingly complains the edge is too high for him to throw himself off, and Rory talks him out of it, reminding him he has a future and to enjoy it.

Later, Michael finds Rory in his bed struggling to breathe, and calls for an ambulance. His disease having progressed, Rory is given only a few days to live. Michael visits Siobhán and with her help goes to the review board on behalf of Rory to argue his case, another chance having come up after six months. The board initially refuse, restating the same arguments, however Michael responds that "the right must exist independently of its exercising" and as a gesture the board approve Rory's independent living allowance in principle – but before they can get to the hospital to tell Rory the news, he has already died.

Michael and Siobhan attend Rory's funeral. Michael hears in his mind Rory's words "Well, then, are we going out?" and after saying goodbye to Siobhan, Michael heads out on his own.

== Cast ==
- James McAvoy as Rory Gerard O'Shea, a rebellious young man with Duchenne muscular dystrophy
- Steven Robertson as Michael Connolly, a 24-year-old long-term resident with cerebral palsy
- Romola Garai as Siobhán, a young woman they employ as a caregiver
- Brenda Fricker as Eileen, a domineering care worker at Michael's care home
- Gerard McSorley as Fergus Connolly, Michael's father who abandoned him at birth
- Tom Hickey as Con O'Shea, Rory's father
- Alan King as Tommy
- Ruth McCabe as Annie
- Anna Healy as Alice
- Deirdre O'Kane (cameo) as a caregiver applicant
- Tony Kenny as cabaret singer

== Production ==
Writer Christian O'Reilly came up with the story after working with Martin Naughton and Dermot Walsh on a campaign for the Centre for Independent Living in Dublin.

== Music ==
The film features Johnny Cash's cover version of "Hurt". Siobhan asks Rory "Were you born like this ... dodgy hair and shit taste in music?" and plays the Cash song for him.

- "Beat for Two" – Elbow
- "Frontier Psychiatrist" – The Avalanches
- "Hurt" (Trent Reznor of Nine Inch Nails) – Johnny Cash
- "Look of Love" – Dusty Springfield
- "Easy" – Groove Armada

== Critical response ==
On the review aggregator website Rotten Tomatoes, 49% of 69 critics' reviews are positive, with an average rating of 5.8/10. The website's consensus reads: "The dramatic aspects of Rory O'Shea Was Here veer into mawkish, formulaic sentiment, which undercuts the characters' individuality." Metacritic, which uses a weighted average, assigned the film a score of 59 out of 100, based on 23 critics, indicating "mixed or average" reviews.
