= Charles E. Kelly (cartoonist) =

Irish illustrator

- Cartoon by Charles E. Kelly from Dublin Opinion (pre-1937)
- Born: 15 June 1902; Dublin, Ireland under British rule
- Died: 20 January 1981 (aged 78); Dublin, Republic of Ireland
- Known for: Cartooning
- Children: Several, including Frank Kelly

Charles Edward Kelly (15 June 1902 – 20 January 1981) was an Irish cartoonist, and one of the founders and editors of the satirical magazine Dublin Opinion. His prolific contributions to the magazine were drawn in a variety of styles, from cartoony to illustrative.

Kelly was educated at Synge Street CBS, and joined the Irish civil service as a messenger boy at the age of 15. At the age of 19 he, fellow cartoonist Arthur Booth, a 28-year-old clerk, and writer Tom Collins, founded Dublin Opinion in 1922, on the eve of the Irish Civil War, with Booth becoming its first editor. Kelly had no formal art training, and developed his style by studying the work of the leading cartoonists of the time. After Booth's death in 1926, Kelly co-edited the magazine with Collins, while continuing to work in the civil service, eventually becoming Director of Broadcasting and Director of National Savings.

Kelly's cartoons were also published in The Capuchin Annual from 1942 to 1955. He began painting watercolours in the 1930s, and became a member of the Dublin Sketching Club and the Water Colour Society of Ireland: he exhibited over 60 pieces at the latter from 1941 to 1980, and had a solo exhibition of his watercolours in Dublin in 1972.

After Collins' death Kelly struggled on with Dublin Opinion for a few years, before it was voluntarily wound up in 1968. He received an honorary doctorate from the National University of Ireland in 1979, and was president and chairman of PEN.

His eldest son, Frank, was an actor best known for playing Father Jack in the Channel 4 sitcom Father Ted. His daughter, Pauline Bracken, is a journalist who wrote a memoir, Light of Other Days: A Dublin Childhood, published in 1992.
