= Adam & Paul =

- Adam & Paul's DVD cover
- Directed by: Lenny Abrahamson
- Written by: Mark O'Halloran
- Produced by: Jonny Speers
- Starring: Tom Murphy; Mark O'Halloran
- Distributed by: Element Pictures
- Release date: 27 August 2004
- Running time: 85 minutes
- Country: Ireland
- Language: English

Adam & Paul is a 2004 Irish buddy comedy drama film directed by Lenny Abrahamson and starring Tom Murphy and Mark O'Halloran. It follows a day in the life of two Dublin drug addicts, Adam and Paul, as they wander around Dublin trying to score heroin.

== Plot ==
Adam and Paul are childhood friends from Dublin who as adults have become heroin addicts. The film is a stylised, downbeat comedy, following the pair through a single day, which, like every other, is devoted to scrounging and robbing money to buy heroin.

Adam and Paul wake up in the middle of a field with Adam and make their way into town via a run-in with a belligerent drug dealer named Martin living in Ballymun. Wandering through St Stephen's Green they meet a group of their old friends who are drinking alcohol. Unwelcome, the boys sit down despite a torrent of abuse from Marian and Orla who are furious with them for not turning up that morning to the month's mind of Matthew, the boys' best friend and Orla's brother. Marian, backed by her brother Wayne, warns them to stay away from his sister, Janine. To the disgust of Wayne and the girls, Georgie lets slip that there was to be a "do" on for Matthew that night in the Bunker pub.

The pair aimlessly wander around the city looking for an unknown person. They have a misunderstanding with a homeless man in a sleeping bag who thinks they're looking for a local troublemaker under the alias of "Clank" who he mistakenly gathers owes them money. They get kicked out of a café for trying to steal a handbag, and Paul gets banned from a shop. After an argument with a Bulgarian immigrant, and failing to get anywhere in their search for drugs, they make their way to Janine's. She is not home but the door is left open. The boys are about to steal her television, when they hear the sound of a baby crying. Janine returns home to find the two gently holding and whispering to the baby. They leave Janine with the promise that they will see her again that night at the Bunker.

A furious man violently confronts them, accusing them of spreading rumours that he owes them money. He identifies himself as Clank. Clank and his friend Zippy kidnap the two and force them to keep a lookout for trouble while they "cause a bit of mayhem" in a nearby garage with baseball bats. Adam and Paul fail to notice the arrival of police, and both Clank and Zippy are arrested.

They decide to take Clank's car to a fence, but crash in the process. They come find a television set and – with the help of a fence named Kittser – take it to Ballymun and attempt to sell it to an older man. But Kittser and the buyer argue and the TV gets damaged in the altercation, forcing a demoralised Adam and Paul to leave. On their way out, they pass the door of drug dealer Martin who is being attacked by a gang of vigilantes. As the two sit outside the block, the contents of Martin's flat are thrown off of his tower block and land on the ground around the boys including two bags of heroin.

After spending the night in the centre of Dublin intoxicated on their find, Paul wakes up the next morning on Dublin Bay. Adam, who is lying behind him, has overdosed and died. Paul, visibly distraught and conflicted, resigns to taking the two bags of heroin from Adam's pockets and leaving.

== Cast ==
- Mark O'Halloran as Adam
- Tom Murphy as Paul
- Gerry Moore as Clank
- Anthony Morris as Zippy
- Ion Caramitru as Bulgarian Man
- Deirdre Molloy as Marian
- Mary Murray as Orla
- Paul Roe as Wayne
- David Herlihy as Kittser
- Eamonn Hunt as Gringo

== Reception ==
Adam & Paul received positive reviews from The Telegraph, The Times, and other UK publications.

Esther McCarthy of the Irish Examiner says that it is one of the Ireland's most-loved films and that it is an acclaimed ground-breaking "gamechanger". The Irish Independent considers the film a "cult movie", and a bittersweet "Irish film classic". In a 2023 poll from the Irish Independent, it was voted the overall second best Irish film.

Time Out gave the film 5/5, calling it "Mordantly funny and unexpectedly poignant".

In 2005, Peter Bradshaw of The Guardian gave the film 3 out of 5 stars. He considers the film to be uncompromisingly bleak, though worthwhile to watch and very funny. Bradshaw called the film's ending a "an unflinchingly grim dismissal of any sentimental triumph of the human spirit".

Leslie Felperin of the Radio Times gives the film 3 out of 5, calling it a "downbeat comedy or slapstick tragedy, depending on which way you look at it".

Total Film gives the film a score of 2 out of 5, describing the film as grim and saying only masochists need apply.

=== Critical analysis ===
Critics have pointed out the similarities between Adam & Paul and Samuel Beckett's Waiting for Godot. Barry Monahan suggests that this is particularly evident in their interactions with the Bulgarian man. He further contends that though exterior spaces are framed as an unheimlich "inversion of the homely", interior spaces are even more inhospitable, framing Adam and Paul as outcasts in their society.

== Release ==
Adam & Paul was first publicly screened at the Galway Film Fleadh in 2004.

On June 16 2024, for the films 20 year anniversary, it was screened at the Irish Film Institute as part of the Bloomsday Film Festival.

== Awards ==
Adam & Paul won the Best Director Award, as well as being nominated in 8 categories at the 2nd Irish Film & Television Awards. These include Best Irish Film, Best Script, Best Actor and Best Music.

At the 2005 Berlin Film Festival, Adam & Paul played as part of the official program of the Panorama section.

== See also ==
- "That's Too Much, Man!", the finale of the third season of Bojack Horseman, where Sarah Lynn dies of a heroine overdose
- The 4th Act, a documentary about Ballymun
