= Donal O'Kelly =

Irish playwright, director and actor

- Born: 1958 (age 67–68); Dublin, Ireland
- Occupations: Playwright, actor
- Writing career
- Language: English
- Years active: 1982–present
- Notable works: Catalpa; Bat The Father, Rabbit The Son; Jimmy Joyced!

Donal O'Kelly (born 1958) is an Irish playwright and actor.

== Early life ==
O'Kelly was born in Dublin in 1958. He worked in the Irish Civil Service as a computer programmer, before quitting to become active in theatre and politics.

== Career ==
O'Kelly's first play was Silicon Sweethearts (1984). In 1993, he co-founded Calypso Productions, dedicated to staging work that deals with human rights. He is a longtime activist and an associate director of Afri.

O'Kelly was elected to Aosdána in 2007; he resigned in 2011 after Dunamaise Arts Centre refused to hang one of Mannix Flynn's works and was accused of censorship by Aosdána; O'Kelly did not agree.

Donal O'Kelly's 1995 play Catalpa won a Scotsman Fringe First Award at the 1996 Edinburgh Fringe Festival and the Critics' Prize at the 1997 Melbourne International Festival in 1997. In 1999 he won the Irish American Cultural Institute Butler Literary Award.

In 2014 his music-drama serial Francisco won the gold medal for Best Drama Special at the New York Festivals Radio Awards.

O'Kelly's film appearances include Jimmy's Hall, The Van and Kings, for which he was nominated for an IFTA. On TV, he has appeared on Paths to Freedom, Ballykissangel and The Clinic.
