= Mark O'Halloran (writer) =

Irish scriptwriter and actor

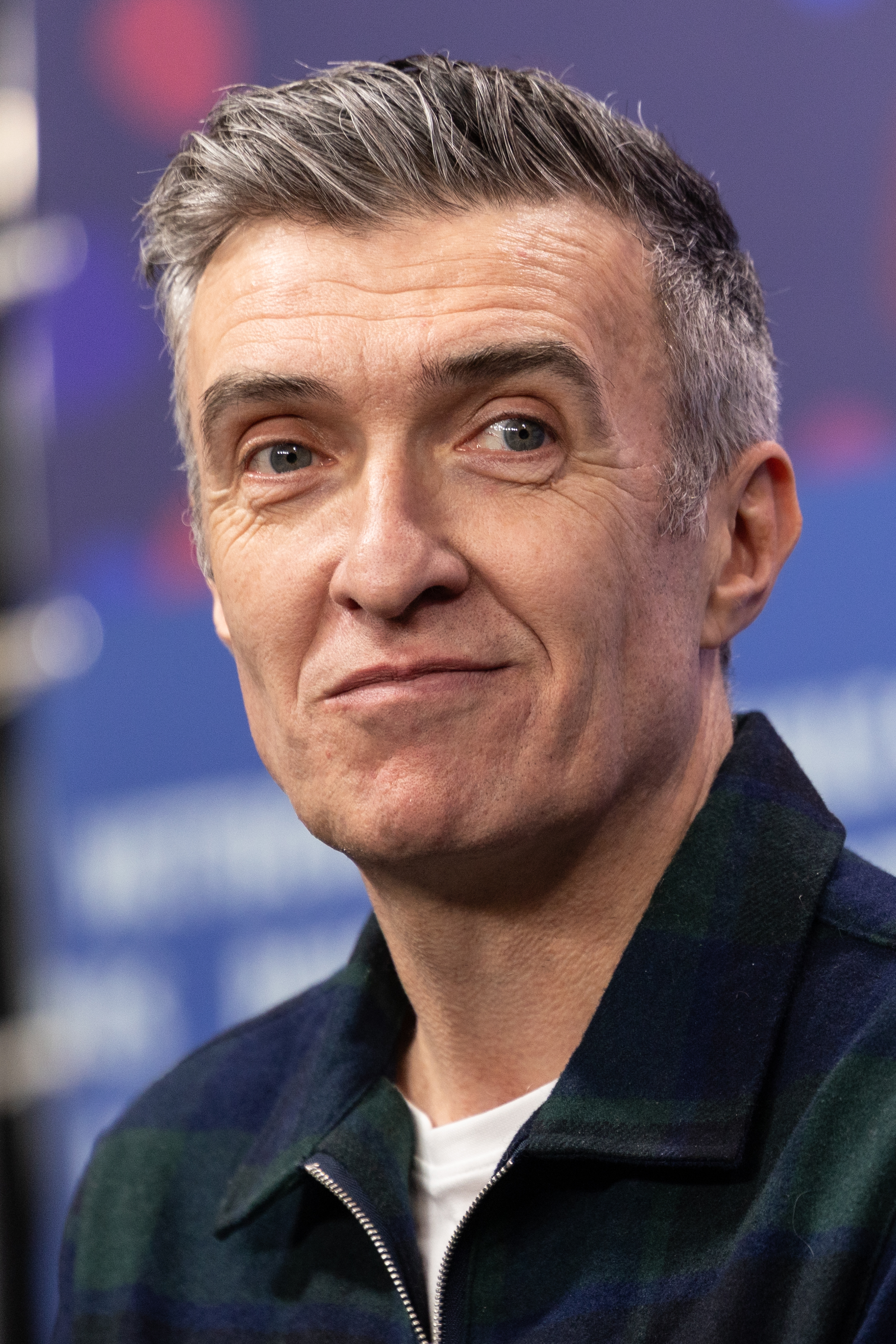
Mark O'Halloran in 2026

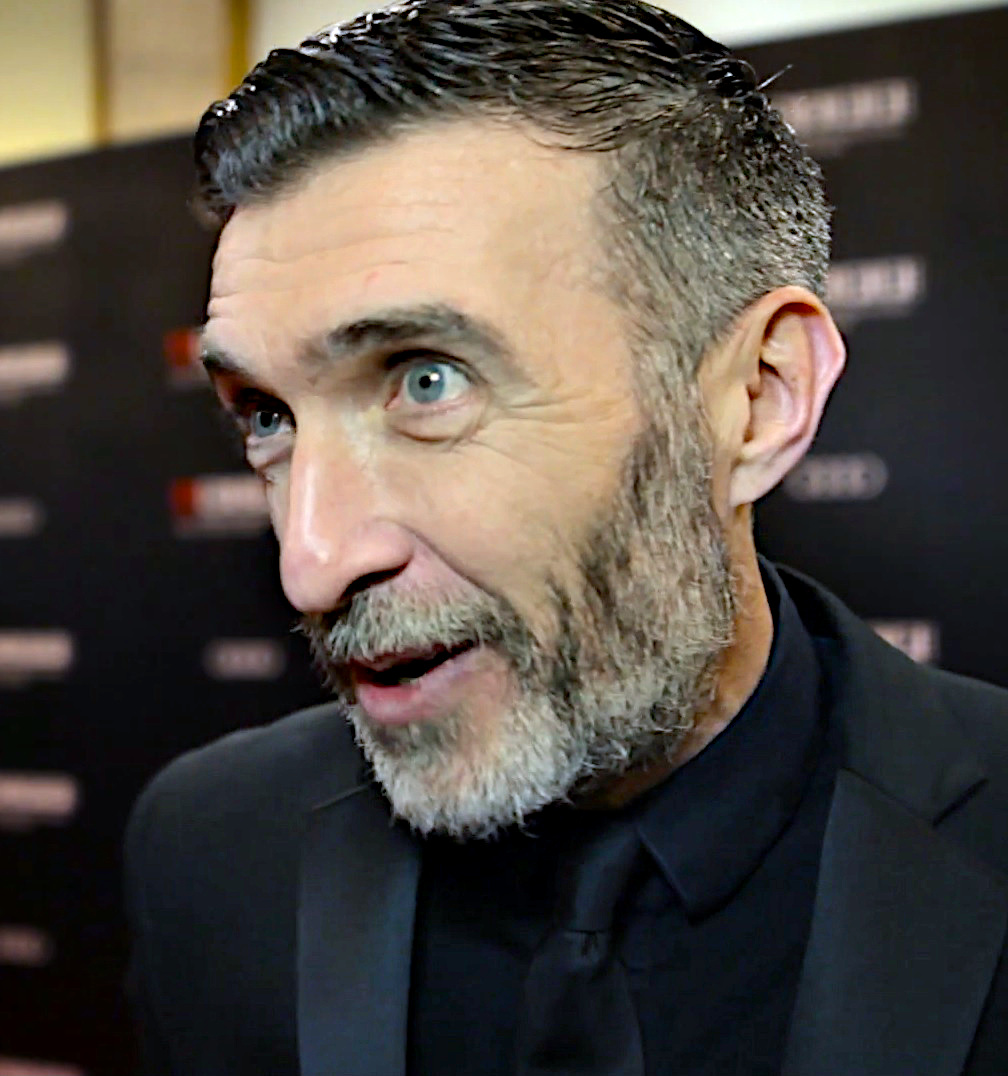
Mark O'Halloran 2016

Mark O'Halloran (Irish: Marcas Ó hAllmhuráin) is an Irish scriptwriter and actor. He is a native of Ennis, County Clare. He has written award-winning screenplays for the films Adam & Paul (in which he co-starred) and Garage and the RTÉ mini-series Prosperity. In 2019 he starred with Stephen Graham in the Channel 4 miniseries The Virtues.

== Early life ==
O'Halloran attended the Gaiety School of Acting graduating in 1992.

== Awards and nominations ==
Awards

- 2005: Gijón International Film Festival Award for Best Actor - Adam & Paul
- 2006: Evening Standard British Award for Best Screenplay - Adam & Paul
- 2008: Irish Film and Television Award for Best Script for Film - Garage
- 2008: Irish Film and Television Award for Best Script for Television - Prosperity
- 2008: Irish Playwrights and Screenwriters Guild Award for Best Television Script - Prosperity

Nominations

- 2004: Irish Film and Television Award Nomination for Best Script - Adam & Paul
- 2005: European Film Award Nomination for Best Screenwriter - Adam & Paul
- 2008: Irish Playwrights and Screenwriters Guild Award Nomination for Best Film - Garage
