= Donovan (given name) =

Donovan is a masculine given name of Irish origin deriving from Ó Donndubháin (brown haired chieftain).Notable people with the name include:

== People ==
- Donovan Alexander (born 1985), Canadian football player
- Donovan Arp (born 1978), American football player
- Donovan Bailey (born 1967), Jamaican-Canadian sprinter
- Donovan Bennett (1964–2005), Jamaican criminal
- Donovan Bixley (born 1971), New Zealand author
- Donovan Blake (born 1961), Jamaican-born American cricketer
- Donovan Boucher (born 1961), Jamaican-Canadian boxer
- Donovan Brown, Canadian actor
- Donovan Browning (1916–1997), English footballer
- Donovan Carrillo (born 1999), Mexican figure skater
- Donovan Casey (born 1996), American baseball player
- Donovan Cech (born 1974), South African rower
- Donovan Chapman, American musician
- Donovan Clingan (born 2004), American basketball player
- Donovan Cook (born 1968), American film director
- Donovan Stewart Correll (1908–1983), American botanist
- Donovan Danhausen (born 1990), American professional wrestler
- Donovan Deekman (born 1988), Dutch footballer
- Donovan Dela Cruz (born 1973), American politician
- Donovan Dent (born 2003), American basketball player
- Donovan Drayton, American musician
- Donovan Duckie (born 1976), Jamaican football manager
- Donovan Džavoronok (born 1997), Czech volleyball player
- Donovan Ebanks (1952–2024), Caymanian diplomat
- Donovan Edwards (born 2003), American football player
- Donovan Ewolo (born 1996), Cameroonian footballer
- Donovan Ezeiruaku (born 2003), American football player
- Donovan Fenton (born 1988), American politician
- Donovan Ferreira (born 1998), South African cricketer
- Donovan Forbes, American football player
- Donovan W. Frank (born 1951), American judge
- Donovan Gans (born 1971), American football player
- Donovan Germain (born 1952), Jamaican musician
- Donovan Greer (born 1974), American football player
- Donovan Grobbelaar (born 1983), New Zealand cricketer
- Donovan Hand (born 1986), American baseball player
- Donovan Henry (born 1978), South African cricketer
- Donovan Hohn (born 1972), American author
- Donovan Isom (born 1994), American football player
- Donovan Jackson (born 2002), American football player
- Donovan Jennings (born 1999), American football player
- Donovan Jeter (born 1998), American football player
- Donovan Joyce (1910–1980), Australian radio producer
- Donovan King (born 1972), Canadian historian
- Donovan Koch (born 1976), South African cricketer
- Donovan Leitch (actor) (born 1967), British-American actor
- Donovan Léon (born 1992), French Guianese footballer
- Donovan Lentz (born 1982), South African cricketer
- Donovan Makoma (born 1999), French footballer
- Donovan Malcolm (born 1959), Jamaican cricketer
- Donovan Matthews (born 1971), Guyanese cricketer
- Donovan Maury (born 1981), Belgian footballer
- Donovan McClelland (1949–2018), Irish politician
- Donovan James McCune (1902–1976), American pediatrician
- Donovan McMillon (born 2002), American football player
- Donovan McNabb (born 1976), American football player
- Donovan Miller (born 1979), Jamaican cricketer
- Donovan Mitchell (born 1996), American basketball player
- Donovan Morgan (born 1976), American professional wrestler
- Donovan Morgan (American football) (born 1982), American football player
- Donovan Olson (born 1965), American politician
- Donovan Olugbode (born 2007), American football player
- Donovan Olumba (born 1995), American football player
- Donovan Osborne (born 1969), American baseball player
- Donovan Pagon (born 1982), West Indian cricketer
- Donovan Patton (born 1978), American actor
- Donovan Pedelty (1903–1989), British journalist
- Donovan Peoples-Jones (born 1999), American football player
- Donovan Pines (born 1998), American soccer player
- Donovan Porterie (born 1987), American football player
- Donovan Powell (born 1971), Jamaican sprinter
- Donovan Raiola (born 1982), American football player
- Donovan Reid (born 1963), British sprinter
- Donovan Richards (born 1983), American politician
- Donovan Ricketts (born 1977), Jamaican soccer player
- Donovan Rose (born 1957), American football player
- Donovan Reginald Rosevear (1900–1986), British forester
- Donovan Ruddock (born 1963), Jamaican-Canadian boxer
- Donovan Scott (born 1947), American actor
- Donovan Sebrango (born 2002), Canadian ice hockey player
- Donovan Simmonds (born 1988), English footballer
- Donovan Sinclair (born 1985), Jamaican cricketer
- Donovan Solano (born 1987), Colombian baseball player
- Donovan Slijngard (born 1987), Dutch footballer
- Donovan Small (born 1964), American football player
- Donovan Smith (born 1993), American football player
- Donovan Smith (quarterback) (born 2001), American football player
- Donovan Swailes (1982–1984), Canadian politician
- Donovan Taofifénua (born 1999), French rugby union footballer
- Donovan Tildesley (born 1984), Canadian swimmer
- Donovan van den Heever (born 1981), South African chess player
- Donovan Walton (born 1994), American baseball player
- Donovan Ward (born 1962), South African artist
- Donovan Warren (born 1989), American football player
- Donovan Webster (1959–2018), American journalist
- Donovan Williams (disambiguation)
- Donovan Wilson (disambiguation)
- Donovan Winter (1933–2015), British filmmaker
- Donovan Wisse (born 1997), Surinamese-Dutch kickboxer
- Donovan Woods (disambiguation)
- Donovan Wylie (born 1971), Northern Irish photographer

== Fictional characters ==
- Donovan Baine, from the Vampire/Darkstalkers series of games
- Donovan Curtis, protagonist of Ungifted, a 2012 children's novel by Gordon Korman
- Donovan Desmond, the main antagonist of the manga Spy × Family
- Donovan Holloway, one of several main characters in American Horror Story: Hotel, portrayed by Matt Bomer
- Donovan, original name Of Specter Knight in the video game expansion Shovel Knight: Specter of Torment

== See also ==
- Donovan (disambiguation)
- Donavan, a given name
- Donavon (disambiguation)
