= Donovan (surname) =

Donovan is a surname of Irish origin. The O'Donovan family takes its name from Donnubán mac Cathail.

== People ==
=== Academia and science ===
- Charles Donovan (1863–1951), Irish-born Anglo-Indian naturalist
- Claire Donovan (1948–2019), British historian
- Edward Donovan (1768–1837), Anglo-Irish zoologist
- Herman Lee Donovan (1887–1964), President of the University of Kentucky
- James Donovan (forensic scientist) (1944–2025), Irish forensic scientist
- John J. Donovan (born 1943), American professor of management science and entrepreneur
- Josephine Donovan (born 1941), American scholar
- Mary Josephine Donovan O'Sullivan (1887–1966), née Donovan, Irish scholar

=== Arts and entertainment ===
- Casey Donovan (actor), (1943–1987), American gay porn star born John Calvin Culver
- Casey Donovan (singer), (born 1988), Australian singer
- Chris Donovan (director), American television director and producer
- Daisy Donovan (born 1973), English television presenter, actress, and writer
- Dan Donovan (guitarist) (born 1960), British singer/songwriter
- Dan Donovan (keyboardist) (born 1962), British rock musician
- Ed Donovan (1931–2025), American actor and editor
- Elisa Donovan (born 1971), American actress, writer, and producer
- Gerard Donovan (born 1959), Irish novelist and poet
- Jacquelyn Piro Donovan, American musical theater actress and singer
- Jason Donovan (born 1968), Australian pop rock singer and actor
- Lisa Donovan (born 1980), American internet actress
- Mark Donovan (actor) (born 1958), Welsh actor
- Martin Donovan (born 1957), American actor
- Michael Donovan (1953–2026), Canadian voice actor and voice director
- Natasha Donovan, Métis Canadian illustrator
- Paul Donovan (writer) (born 1954), creator of LEXX
- Tara Donovan (born 1969), American artist
- Tate Donovan (born 1963), American actor
- Terence Donovan (actor) (1942–2026), Australian actor
- Terence Donovan (photographer) (1936–1996), British photographer

=== Government ===
- Bob Donovan (born 1956), Wisconsin politician
- Christopher G. Donovan (born 1953), Connecticut politician
- Dan Donovan (politician), American politician
- Daniel M. Donovan Jr. (born 1956), United States Representative from New York City
- Francis Patrick Donovan (1922–2012), Australian ambassador to OECD and UN
- James G. Donovan (1898–1987), Democratic politician, former New York State Senator and US Representative
- James H. Donovan (1923–1990), Republican politician, former New York State Senator
- Jeremiah Donovan (1857–1935), Connecticut politician
- Jerome F. Donovan (1872–1949), US Representative from New York
- J. J. Donovan (1858–1937), Washington state pioneer and politician
- Johannah Leddy Donovan (born 1944), American educator and politician
- John Donovan (Irish politician) (1878–1922), Irish nationalist politician
- Raymond J. Donovan (1930–2021), American businessman and Secretary of Labor (1981–1985)
- Shaun Donovan (born 1966), American former US Secretary of Housing and Urban Development and director of the Office of Management and Budget
- Terence Donovan, Baron Donovan (1898–1971), British Labour Party politician and judge

=== Military and intelligence ===
- Edward Westby Donovan (1821–1897), commander of British troops in China, also colonel of the East Yorkshire Regiment
- Francis L. Donovan, US Marine Corps general
- James B. Donovan (1916–1970), American lawyer, US Navy officer, and member of the Office of Strategic Services
- Matthew Donovan (born 1958), Under Secretary of Defense for Personnel and Readiness, retired US Air Force colonel
- William J. Donovan (1883–1959), American lawyer, soldier, and espionage chief

=== Sports ===
- Alun Donovan (born 1955), Welsh rugby player
- Art Donovan (1924–2013), American football player
- Bill Donovan (1876–1923), American baseball player and manager
- Bill Donovan (Boston Braves pitcher) (1916–1997), American baseball player
- Billy Donovan (born 1965), American basketball coach
- Brendan Donovan (born 1997), German–born American baseball player
- Colby Donovan (born 2006), Scottish footballer
- Dick Donovan (1927–1997), Major League Baseball pitcher
- Don Donovan (1929–2013), Irish footballer and manager
- Joshua Donovan (born 1999), American football player
- Kevin Donovan (born 1971), English footballer
- Landon Donovan (born 1982), American soccer player
- Larry Donovan (1941–2025), American football coach
- Professor Mike Donovan (1847–1918), American bare-knuckle boxer and teacher
- Patsy Donovan (1865–1953), Irish-American professional baseball player
- Roy Donovan (1903–1972), Australian rules footballer
- Shean Donovan (born 1975), Canadian ice hockey player

=== Other fields ===
- Allen F. Donovan (1914–1995), American aerospace engineer
- Carrie Donovan (1928–2001), American fashion magazine editor
- Daniel Donovan (doctor) (died 1880), doctor of medicine and author
- Ed Donovan (engine builder) (1928–1989), American racing engine and parts builder
- Hedley Donovan (1914–1990), American magazine editor
- Jean Donovan (1953–1980), American lay missionary
- Jim Donovan (banker) (born 1967), American banker
- John Anthony Donovan (1911–1991), Bishop of Toledo
- Larry Donovan (bridge jumper) (1862–1888), American typesetter who jumped from bridges
- Paul Donovan (economist) (born 1972), UBS Global Chief Economist
- Paul Vincent Donovan (1924–2011), Bishop of Kalamazoo

== Fictional characters ==
- Clyde Donovan, a character from South Park
  - Roger Donovan, Clyde's father
  - Betsy Donovan, Clyde's mother
- Curtis Donovan, from the British TV series Misfits
- Mark Donovan, a secondary character from the British teen sitcom The Inbetweeners
- Mike Donovan, one of the main characters of the original V franchise
- Race Donovan, the Ribb family assassin from the manga Black Cat by Kentaro Yabuki
- Ray Donovan, titular character of the American crime drama television series
- Victor Donovan, main antagonist in the Dead or Alive series
- Walter Donovan the main antagonist of the film Indiana Jones and the Last Crusade
- W. H. Donovan, in the novel Donovan's Brain by Curt Siodmak

== See also ==
- O'Donovan (surname)
- Edward Donavon (1872–1951), Irish cricketer
