= Donovans =

Donovans may refer to:

- Donovans, Newfoundland and Labrador, Canada, a former village now within the borders of the town of Paradise, Newfoundland and Labrador
- Donovans, South Australia, a locality in Australia
- The Donovans, an Australian Aboriginal country band

== See also ==
- Donovan (disambiguation)
