= O'Donovan (surname) =

O'Donovan is a surname of Irish origin. It may refer to:

- Ambrose O'Donovan (born 1962), former Gaelic footballer
- Aoife O'Donovan (born 1982), Irish-American singer and songwriter
- Brian O'Donovan (born 1980), Irish journalist
- Colman O'Donovan (1927–2025), Irish hurler
- Conor O'Donovan (born 1962), Irish former hurler
- Daniel O'Donovan, Member of Parliament James II's Patriot Parliament in 1690
- Daniel O'Donovan (Irish republican) (1890–1975), member of the Irish Republican Army
- Darragh O'Donovan (1995), Irish hurler
- Denis O'Donovan (born 1955), Irish politician, former Cathaoirleach of Seanad Éireann
- Dennis J. O'Donovan (died 1892), American Roman Catholic priest
- Domhnall O'Donovan (born 1988), Irish hurler
- Donal II O'Donovan (died 1639), the O'Donovan of Clann Cathail, Lord of Clancahill
- Donal III O'Donovan (died 1660), chief of the O'Donovan family
- Donal IV O'Donovan (died 1705), Member of Parliament
- Edwin O'Donovan (1914–2000), American art director
- Fachtna O'Donovan (1921–1995) Irish Gaelic footballer
- Frank O'Donovan (1900–1974), Irish actor, singer and songwriter
- Fred O'Donovan (actor) (1884–1952), Irish actor, film maker and theatre manager
- Fred O'Donovan (theatre producer) (1930–2010), Irish theatre producer and businessman
- Gary O'Donovan (born 1992), Irish rower
- Gerald O'Donovan (1871–1942), Irish priest and writer born Jeremiah Donovan
- Gerard O'Donovan (born 1958), Irish author
- Ímar Ua Donnubáin or Ivor O'Donovan, a legendary petty king, navigator, trader and reputed necromancer of 13th century Ireland
- Jeremiah O'Donovan (died 1709), O'Donovan of Clanloughlin, Registrar for the Admiralty (Ireland) under James II
- Jeremiah O'Donovan Rossa (1831–1915), Fenian, Irish Republican Brotherhood figure
- Jerome X. O'Donovan (1944–2014), US Marine Corps captain, New York City councilman
- John O'Donovan (disambiguation)
- Leo J. O'Donovan (born 1934), former President of Georgetown University
- Maeve O'Donovan (born 1990), Irish singer and songwriter
- Máirín O'Donovan (born 1936), Irish actress, singer and dancer
- Michael C. O'Donovan, Scottish psychiatric geneticist
- Michael Francis O'Donovan (1903–1966), birth name of Irish author Frank O'Connor
- Morgan John Winthrop O'Donovan (1893–1969), British Army brigadier and O'Donovan of Clancahill
- Morgan William II O'Donovan (1861–1940), the O'Donovan of Clancahill
- Niall O'Donovan, Irish rugby union coach
- Noel O'Donovan (actor) (1949–2019), Irish actor
- Oliver O'Donovan (born 1945), British Anglican priest, academic and theologian
- Ollie O'Donovan (born 1966), Irish rallycross driver
- Patrick O'Donovan (born 1977), Irish Fine Gael politician
- Paul O'Donovan (born 1994), Irish rower
- Prue O'Donovan (1950–2023), Archdeacon of Flinders in the Anglican Diocese of Willochra
- Richard O'Donovan ((1764/1768–1829), British Army lieutenant general and the O'Donovan of Clancahill
- Roy O'Donovan (born 1985), Irish footballer
- Ross O'Donovan (born 1987), animator and co-host of YouTube webseries, Steam Train
- Seamus O'Donovan (1896–1979), Irish Republican Army member and Nazi Abwehr agent
- Seán O'Donovan (1893–1975), Irish Fianna Fáil politician and Veterinarian
- Tim O'Donovan (1932–2025), English monarchist
- Timothy O'Donovan (1881–1951), Irish politician, Cathaoirleach of Seanad Éireann
- Val O'Donovan (1936–2005), Cork-born Canadian electrical engineer, businessman, co-founder of COM DEV and Chancellor of the University of Waterloo
- William Rudolf O'Donovan (1844–1920), American sculptor
- William O'Donovan (politician) (1886–1955), British Conservative Party politician

== Fictional characters ==
- Liam O'Donovan (Tracy Beaker Returns), Tracy Beaker character

== See also ==
- O'Donovan family
- Donovan (surname)
- Donovan (disambiguation)
