= Donavon =

Donavon may refer to:

== People ==
- Donavon Clark (born 1992), American former football player
- Donavon Frankenreiter (born 1972), American musician and surfer
- Donavon Hawk (born 1981), American politician
- Donavon Larson (1947–2004), American college football player and head coach
- Donavon Smallwood (born 1994), American photographer
- Donavon F. Smith (1922–1974), United States Air Force lieutenant general and flying ace
- Edward Donavon (1872–1951), Irish cricketer

== Places ==
- Donavon, Saskatchewan, Canada, a hamlet

== See also ==
- Donavan (disambiguation)
- Donovan (disambiguation)
