= Dan Donovan =

Dan or Daniel Donovan may refer to:

- Dan Donovan (keyboardist) (born 1962), keyboardist for Big Audio Dynamite and Dreadzone
- Dan Donovan (guitarist) (born 1960), singer/songwriter, guitarist for Tribe of Dan
- Dan Donovan (politician) (born 1956), Former U.S. Congressman
- Daniel Donovan (New Hampshire politician), politician
- Daniel Donovan (doctor) (died 1880), author and doctor of medicine in West Cork, Ireland
- Daniel Donovan (theologian) (born 1937), Canadian theologian, catholic priest and art collector
