= William Donovan =

William or Bill(y) Donovan may refer to:

== Sports ==
- Bill Donovan (1876–1923), pitcher and manager in Major League Baseball
- Bill Donovan (Boston Braves pitcher) (1916–1997), pitcher in Major League Baseball
- Billy Donovan (born 1965), American basketball coach and former player
- William F. Donovan (1865–1928), Harvard University coach
- William Fitz Donovan (1873–1930), American football player and coach
- William Donovan III (born 1992), American basketball coach

== Other ==
- William J. Donovan (1883–1959), American soldier, lawyer, intelligence officer and wartime head of the Office of Strategic Services
- William Lovery Donovan, owner of the historic Star Lite Motel

== See also ==
- William Donovan Joynt (1889–1986), Australian recipient of the Victoria Cross
- Donovan Williams (disambiguation)
- Donovan (disambiguation)
