= O'Donovan (disambiguation) =

O'Donovan is an Irish family name.

It may refer to:

- O'Donovan (surname), surname
- O'Donovan family, a patronymic surname that derives from Irish Ó Donnabháin, meaning the grandsons or descendants of Donnubán
- O'Donovan Rossa (Skibbereen) GAA, O'Donovan Rossa or Skibbereen, a Gaelic football and hurling club based in Skibbereen, County Cork, Ireland.
- O'Donovan Rossa GAC Belfast, Gaelic Athletic Association club based in Belfast, County Antrim.

== See also ==
Donovan (disambiguation)
