= Anthony Kersting =

British architectural photographer

Anthony Frank Kersting, FRGS (7 November 1916 – 2 September 2008) was a British architectural photographer. His images of British, European, and Middle Eastern architecture also feature urban and village life, landscape, commerce, transport and leisure. He was considered to be the leading architectural photographer of his generation.

Publications. Add “Crusader Castles - Burgen der Kreuzritter” 1966; text by Mueller-Wiener, publisher Deutscher Kunstverlag.

== Biography ==
Kersting was born in 37 Frewin Road in Wandsworth, South London, and studied at Dulwich College, where he developed an interest in photography.

After leaving Dulwich he worked at the Sloane Square branch of Lloyds Bank. In 1936 the publication in newspapers of his photographs depicting the new Peter Jones department store influenced a change in career. In 1939 he volunteered for the Royal Air Force and, in 1941, was posted to Egypt. After the war Kersting continued to work as a freelance architectural photographer, illustrating books for Batsford, Nikolaus Pevsner's Guides, Arthur Mee's King’s England series, Encyclopedia Britannica as well as working for Country Life and for the National Trust. In 1947, Kersting was elected a Fellow of the Royal Geographical Society and, in 1999, an exhibition of his photographs was held at the Wandsworth Museum.

Kersting died in 2008 at the age of 91.

== Legacy ==
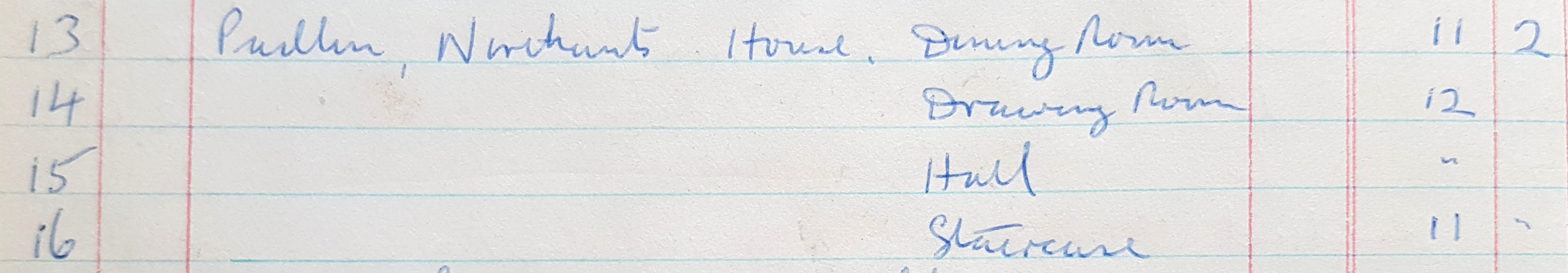
Extract from Kersting's "H" ledger, showing entries for photos taken at Pailton House, Warwickshire, on 11 and 12 February 1958

The complete archive of Kersting's black and white prints, glass and film negatives, and hand-written ledgers is now held in the Conway Library, the architectural photography collection of the Courtauld Institute of Art, an independent college of the University of London.

Thousands of photographic prints and negatives are being digitised and will be available in the public domain.

Kersting's work includes photographs of:

- People and places around the Middle East, including: sites since destroyed by Daesh; Yazidi people in Iraq; Palmyra, Syria; the Hagia Sophia
- Religious sites and street scenes in Nepal
- Country estates across the UK, including Duncombe Park, and Castle Howard

== Research ==
A talk entitled "A Possible Life of Anthony Kersting" was given by his biographer, Tom Bilson, at Dulwich College on 20 June 2018 as part of the 11th GE Moore Lecture Series.

Between June - November 2020, the inaugural Project Space exhibition at the Courtauld, "Kurdistan in the 1940s", included 21 of Kersting's photographs.

== Publications ==
- The Architecture of Medieval Britain, Colin Platt, with photographs by Anthony Kersting. New Haven; London: Yale University Press, 1990.
- Architecture in Britain, 1530 to 1830, John Summerson; with colour photography by A. F. Kersting. New Haven; London: Yale University Press, 1993. British Library General Reference Collection YC.1995.b.1549.
- Cirencester. A series of illustrations. Photographs by A. F. Kersting, etc. London; New York: B. T. Batsford, 1951. British Library General Reference Collection 010368.t.37.
- Portrait of Oxford: A Selection of Photographs by A. F. Kersting with text by Marcus Dick. London : B. T. Batsford, 1956.
- Prospect of London. Photographs by A. F. Kersting. Introduction by Anthony Thorne. London: B. T. Batsford, 1965. British Library General Reference Collection X.802/244.
- Portrait of Westminster. A selection of photographs by A. F. Kersting with text by L. C. Spaull. London; Amsterdam: B. T. Batsford, 1964. British Library General Reference Collection X.802/48.
- English Country Houses in Colour. A collection of colour photographs by A. F. Kersting. With an introductory text and notes on the illustrations by R. Dutton. London; printed in the Netherlands : B. T. Batsford, 1958. British Library General Reference Collection 010352.i.53.
- Dulwich 400. The First Four Hundred Years 1619–2019. Edited by Jan Piggott and Nick Black. London: Order of the Governors of Dulwich College, 2019: 90, 101, 107, 170, 185.
