= Valor Ecclesiasticus =

1535 survey of church finances in England, Wales and English-controlled parts of Ireland

- The National Archives, Kew, London
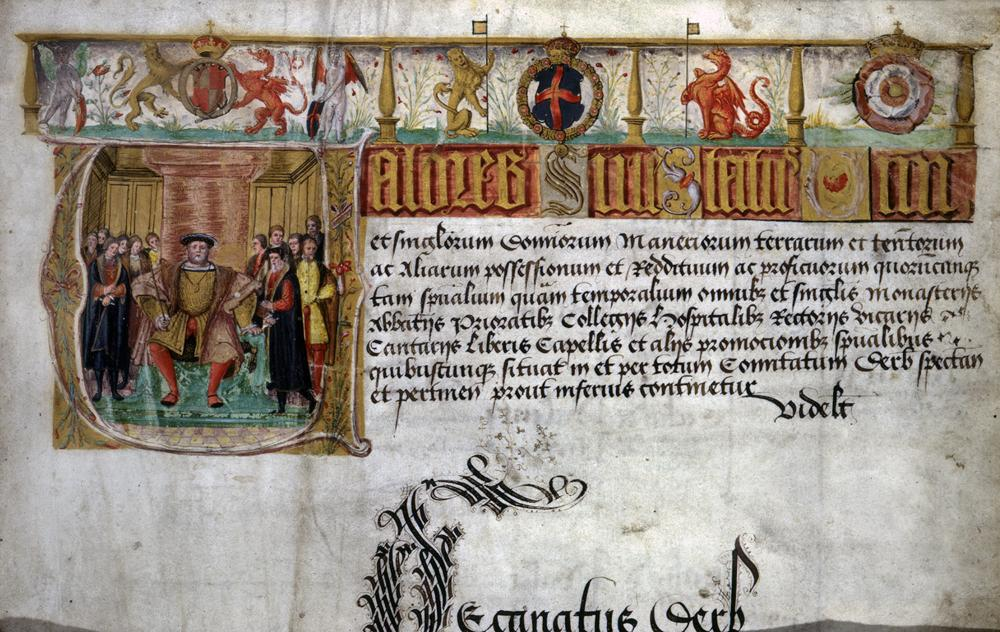
- Title page
- Date: 1535

The Valor Ecclesiasticus (Latin: "church valuation") was a survey of the finances of the church in England, Wales and English controlled parts of Ireland made in 1535 on the orders of Henry VIII. It was colloquially called the Kings books, a somewhat ambiguous term.

In 1534, King Henry parted with the Pope and the Catholic religion and by the Act of Supremacy made himself the supreme head of the church in his lands. One of his first actions in his new role was to impose taxes on the clergy. Taxes traditionally paid by clerics to the Pope were now to be given to him, and Henry also decided in late 1534 to create a new annual income tax of 10% on the income from all church lands and offices. To properly assess the new tax a survey of all church property and revenues had to be made.

In January 1535, the government appointed commissions throughout the country to conduct the survey. All clergymen, parish priests, heads of monasteries, colleges, hospitals and other institutions under church auspices were commanded to give sworn testimony before their local commissioners as to their income, the lands their establishments owned and the revenues they received from all other sources. The commissioners were to examine documents and account books and from these and the testimony provide a full financial statement for every religious institution. The work of collecting the information was ordered to be completed by 30 May 1535 and the results sent in to the Exchequer in London.

The commissioners were unpaid and untrained, mostly local gentry, mayors, magistrates, bishops and sheriffs, but they approached the vast task with speed and, by the summer of 1535, the government had in its hands a detailed accounting of the property and wealth of the church. Most of their work survives, preserved in 22 Latin volumes and three folders at The National Archives in Kew. Two of the volumes are illuminated manuscripts and seem to be a summary made for King Henry's personal use.

== Accuracy ==
The commissioners had no particular reason to be partial to the clergy and they applied themselves to the task with much diligence. Where the figures can be checked, for example against the financial records of the king's officials in charge of dissolving monasteries in the later 1530s, they are shown to be broadly accurate though on the low side, in some cases by as much as 15%. There is, particularly in the north, a tendency to underestimate the value of some important classes of asset, especially agricultural land held in desmesne and woodland with standing timber. One theory to account for this is the natural tendency of taxpayers to make conservative estimates combined with the rushed nature of the work, which encouraged the commissioners to give the benefit of the doubt. Standing timber moreover, by its nature, provides a resource of occasional exceptional income, rather than a steady annual income stream, and hence was commonly ignored in income assessments for 16th century inventories of landed assets.

In a few instances the discrepancy is of so large a scale as to suggest deliberate fraud in the returns in the Valor Ecclesiasticus; as was the case for example of Norton Priory in Cheshire, where the submitted figure was so low as to render the abbey liable for suppression under the first (1536) statute for the dissolution of lesser religious houses.

== Significance ==
The Valor gave the government for the first time a solid understanding of the scale of the wealth of the church as a whole and particularly of the monasteries. It was not long before King Henry began planning ways of seizing much of these riches for himself, starting with the smaller religious houses. Figures from the Valor were a vital part of the process of the Suppression of Religious Houses Act 1535, Henry's first move in the dissolution of the monasteries, which dissolved all monasteries with a declared income of less than £200 per year.

The Valor is a document of the first importance for historians of the later mediæval and Tudor church, the English Reformation, and the Dissolution. It is also valuable to economic historians of the period.

A three year Rediscovering the Tudor Domesday project to digitise and share the Valor Ecclesiasticus was launched in 2025.

== Bibliography and references ==
- Abbeys and Priories in England and Wales, Bryan Little, Batsford 1979
- The Abbeys and Priories of Medieval England, Colin Platt, Secker & Warburg 1984
- Bare Ruined Choirs, David Knowles, Cambridge University Press 1959
