= Jack Donovan (disambiguation) =

Jack Donovan (born 1974) is an American masculist and writer.

Jack Donovan may also refer to:

- Jack Donovan (footballer) (1908–1964), Australian rules footballer
- Jack Donovan (actor) (1894–1981), American film actor

== See also ==
- John Donovan (disambiguation)
