= Doniphan =

Doniphan may refer to:

Places

In the United States:

- Doniphan, Kansas
- Doniphan, Missouri
- Doniphan, Nebraska
- Doniphan County, Kansas

People

- Alexander William Doniphan

== See also ==
- Donovan (disambiguation)
