= Matt Donovan =

Matt Donovan may refer to:

- Matt Donovan (ice hockey) (born 1990), American ice hockey defenceman
- Matt Donovan (poet), American poet
- Matt Donovan (fictional character), a character on the television show The Vampire Diaries
- Matt Donovan (rugby league, born 1970), Australian rugby league player
- Matt Donovan (Russian rugby league), Russian international rugby league player
- Matthew Donovan (born 1958), American government official

== See also ==
- Donovan (surname)
