= Robert Donovan =

Robert Donovan may refer to:

- Robert Donovan (cricketer) (1899–1932), Irish cricketer
- Robert J. Donovan (1912–2003), Washington correspondent, author and presidential historian
