= Aperture Foundation =

Nonprofit arts institution

- Formation: 1952
- Type: Nonprofit
- Legal status: Foundation
- Headquarters: 380 Columbus Ave, New York, NY 10024
- Services: Photography publications, events, and venues
- Website: aperture.org

Aperture Foundation is a nonprofit arts institution, founded in 1952 by Ansel Adams, Minor White, Barbara Morgan, Dorothea Lange, Nancy Newhall, Beaumont Newhall, Ernest Louie, Melton Ferris, and Dody Warren. Their vision was to create a forum for fine art photography, a new concept at the time. The first issue of the magazine Aperture was published in spring 1952 in San Francisco.

In January 2011, Chris Boot joined the organization as its director. Boot has previously been an independent photobook publisher and worked with Magnum Photos and Phaidon Press. Sarah Meister, curator of photography at the Museum of Modern Art from 2009 to 2020, was named as Boot's replacement in the Executive Director position in January 2021, starting in May 2021.

== Books ==
Aperture Foundation is a publisher of photography books, with more than 600 titles in print. Its book publication program began in 1965, with Edward Weston: The Flame of Recognition, which became one of its best-selling titles. Some, like Diane Arbus: An Aperture Monograph, have been in print for 40 years. Aperture supports the efforts of other non-profit organizations by partnering on books, exhibitions, and educational programming.

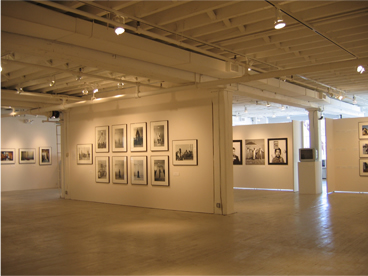
Aperture Gallery in Chelsea

== Aperture/Michael E. Hoffman Award ==
In 2003, the Foundation instituted the first Aperture/Michael E. Hoffman Award, in memory of Michael E. Hoffman (died 2001), who was Aperture's publisher for 37 years.

== The Paris Photo–Aperture PhotoBook Awards ==
The Paris Photo–Aperture PhotoBook Awards is a yearly photography book award that is given jointly by Paris Photo and Aperture. It is announced at the Paris Photo fair and was established in 2012. The categories are Photography Catalog of the Year, PhotoBook of the Year and First PhotoBook (with a $10,000 prize).

== Aperture Portfolio Prize ==
The Aperture Portfolio Prize is an annual international competition to discover, exhibit, and publish new talents in photography.

Winners:

- 2006: Hiroshi Watanabe
- 2007: Julio Bittencourt
- 2008: Michael Corridore
- 2009: Alexander Gronsky
- 2010: David Favrod
- 2011: Sarah Palmer
- 2013: Bryan Schutmaat
- 2014: Amy Elkins
- 2015: Drew Nikonowicz
- 2016: Eli Durst
- 2017: Natalie Krick
- 2018: Ka-Man Tse
- 2019: Mark McKnight
- 2020: Dannielle Bowman
- 2021: Donavon Smallwood
- 2022: Felipe Romero Beltrán
- 2023: Vân-Nhi Nguyen

== Exhibitions ==
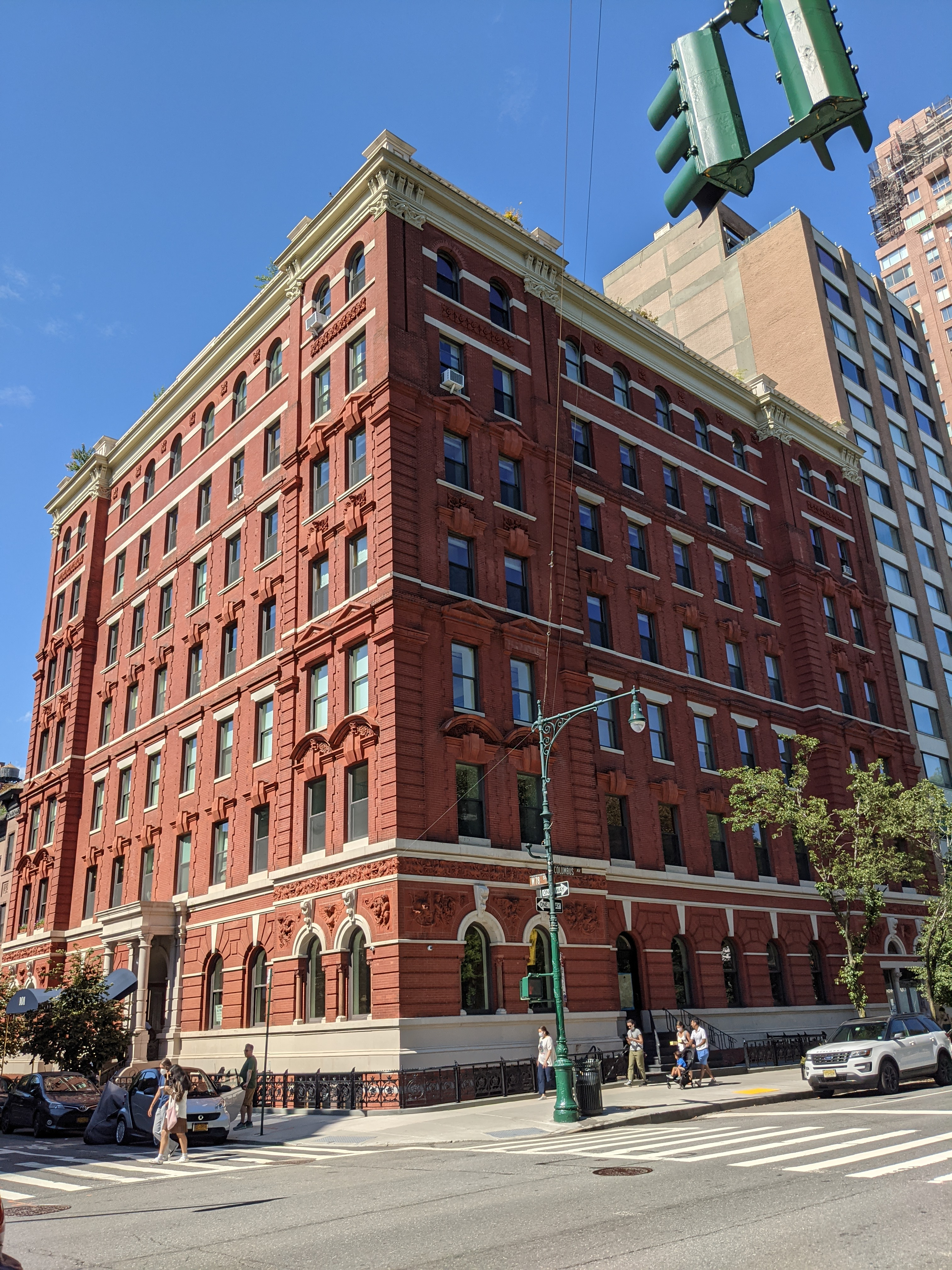
380 Columbus Avenue, location to open 2024

In 2005, Aperture’s three-thousand-square-foot gallery opened in New York’s Chelsea art district. Many of the shows travel to venues in the U.S. and abroad. Aperture's Chelsea gallery showcases exhibitions organized by sister institutions.

Aperture has exhibited shows including Nazar: Photographs from the Arab World; Joan Fontcuberta: Landscapes Without Memory; William Christenberry, Photographs: 1961–2005; A Couple of Ways of Doing Something, images by Chuck Close, poems by Bob Holman; Lisette Model and Her Successors; and the Lucie-nominated Invasion 68: Prague, photographs by Josef Koudelka.
