= John Donovan =

John Donovan may refer to:

- John Donovan (Australian politician) (1902–1976), member of the New South Wales Legislative Assembly
- John Donovan (American football) (born 1974), American football coach
- John Donovan (writer) (1928–1992), American writer of young adult literature
- John Anthony Donovan (1911–1991), Canadian-born prelate
- John A. K. Donovan (1907–1993), Virginia lawyer, state senator, dog breeder and author
- J. J. Donovan (1858–1937), Washington state businessman and politician
- John J. Donovan (born 1942), retired American professor
- John J. Donovan Jr. (1913–1955), New York state senator
- John Donovan (Irish politician) (1878–1922), Irish nationalist politician
- Johnny Donovan, American radio announcer

== Characters ==
- John Donovan, character in Air Devils
- John Donovan, character in Mafia III
- Johnny Montgomery aka John Dustin Donovan, a character in As the World Turns
- 24: Legacy#Starring

== See also ==
- Jack Donovan (disambiguation)
- John O'Donovan (disambiguation)
