= Polyostotic fibrous dysplasia =

Replacement of more than one bone with fibrous tissue

- Other names: Albright's disease
- Specialty: Osteology

Polyostotic fibrous dysplasia is a form of fibrous dysplasia affecting more than one bone. Fibrous dysplasia is a disorder where bone is replaced by fibrous tissue, leading to weak bones, uneven growth, and deformity.

McCune–Albright syndrome includes polyostotic fibrous dysplasia as part of its presentation. When polyostotic fibrous dysplasia manifests in the long bones, limping results; when it manifests in the face, asymmetric growth of the face can result.

One treatment that has been used is bisphosphonates.

== See also ==
- Fibrous dysplasia of bone
- Monostotic fibrous dysplasia
- List of radiographic findings associated with cutaneous conditions
