= McCune–Albright syndrome =

Mosaic genetic disorder affecting the bone, skin and endocrine systems

McCune-Albright syndrome
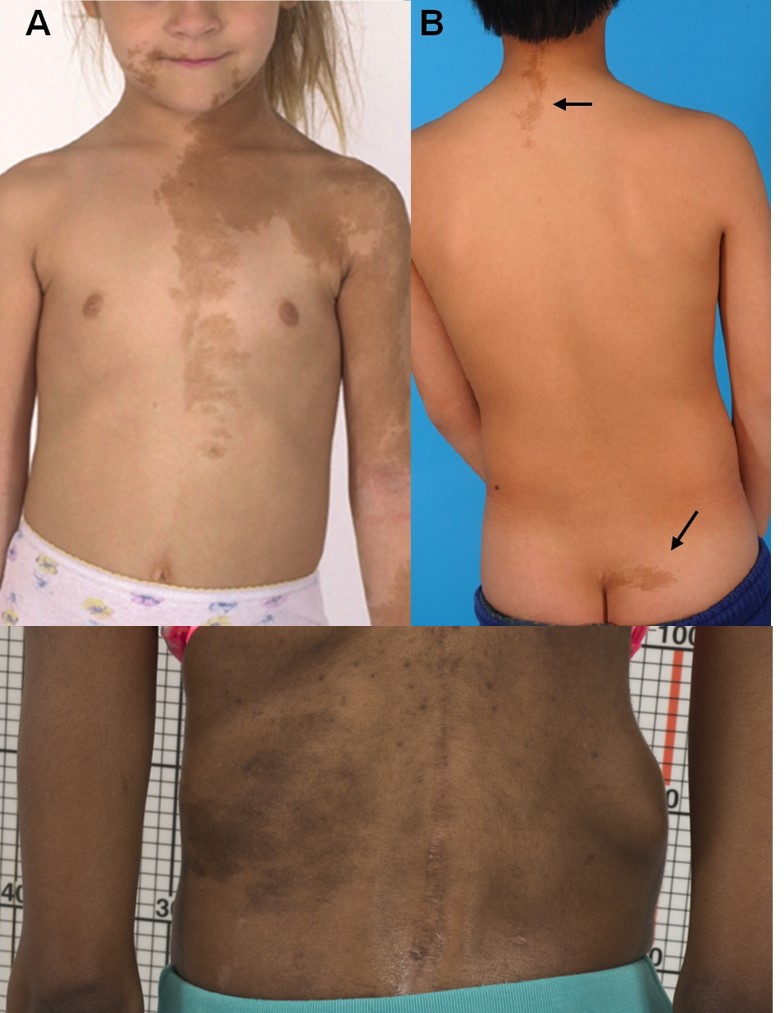
- Skin hyperpigmentation. A) A typical lesion on the face, chest, and arm of a 5-year-old girl with McCune-Albright syndrome which demonstrates jagged "coast of Maine" borders, and the tendency for the lesions to both respect the midline and follow the developmental lines of Blaschko. B) Typical lesions that are often found on the nape of the neck and crease of the buttocks are shown (black arrows). C) A typical lesion on the lower back in an adult with McCune-Albright syndrome demonstrates jagged borders (white arrow). Note the spinal asymmetry due to fibrous dysplasia-related scoliosis.
- Specialty: Medical genetics
- Frequency: 0.0005%
- Named after: Donovan James McCune; Fuller Albright

McCune–Albright syndrome is a complex genetic disorder affecting the bone, skin and endocrine systems. It is a mosaic disease arising from somatic activating mutations in GNAS, which encodes the alpha-subunit of the G_{s} heterotrimeric G protein.

It was first described in 1937 by American pediatrician Donovan James McCune and American endocrinologist Fuller Albright.

== Signs and symptoms ==
McCune–Albright syndrome is suspected when two or more of the following features are present:

- Fibrous dysplasia (specifically, polyostotic fibrous dysplasia)
- Hyperpigmented skin lesions with characteristic features, including jagged "coast of Maine" borders and tendency occur along the midline of the body. These lesions are historically termed café au lait macules, however the term "cafe-au-lait" only describes their appearance on lighter-skinned individuals.
- Hyperfunctioning endocrine disease

Patients may have one or many of these features, which may occur in any combination. As such, the clinical presentation of patients with McCune Albright syndrome varies greatly depending on the disease features.

Various endocrine diseases may present in McCune–Albright syndrome due to increased hormone production.

- Precocious puberty: The most common endocrinopathy is precocious puberty, which presents in girls (~85%) with recurrent estrogen-producing cysts leading to episodic breast development, growth acceleration, and vaginal bleeding. Precocious puberty may also occur in boys with McCune–Albright syndrome, but is much less common (~10–15%). In children of both sexes, growth acceleration may lead to tall stature in childhood, however premature bone maturation may lead to early growth plate fusion and short stature in adulthood.
- Testicular abnormalities: Testicular abnormalities are seen in a majority (~85%) of boys with McCune–Albright syndrome. These typically present with macro-orchidism. On pathology lesions show Leydig and Sertoli cell hyperplasia.
- Hyperthyroidism: Hyperthyroidism occurs in approximately one-third of patients with McCune Albright syndrome. Patients have characteristic abnormalities on thyroid ultrasound, and may have a slight increased risk for thyroid cancer.
- Growth hormone excess: Excess growth hormone secretion and is found in approximately 10–15% of patients. This may lead to expansion of craniofacial fibrous dysplasia, increasing the risk of vision and hearing loss.
- Cushing's syndrome: In McCune–Albright syndrome, Cushing's syndrome is a very rare feature that develops only in infancy.
- Hypophosphatemia due to increased fibroblast growth factor 23 production may lead to rickets, osteomalacia, and worsening skeletal outcomes.

== Genetics ==
Genetically, there is a spontaneous postzygotic mutation of the gene GNAS, on the long (q) arm of chromosome 20 at position 13.3, which is involved in G-protein signaling. This mutation, which occurs only in the mosaic state, leads to constitutive receptor signaling and inappropriate production of excess cAMP.

The mutation that causes McCune–Albright syndrome arises very early during embryogenesis. Because all cases of the syndrome are sporadic, it is believed that the mutation would be lethal if it affected all cells in the embryo. Mutant cells can only survive when they are intermixed with normal cells.

There are no known risk factors for acquiring McCune–Albright syndrome, and no exposures during pregnancy that are known to either cause or prevent the mutation from occurring. The disease cannot be inherited and occurs equally among all ethnic groups.

== Diagnosis ==
McCune–Albright syndrome has different levels of severity. For example, one child with McCune–Albright syndrome may be entirely healthy, with no outward evidence of bone or endocrine problems, enter puberty at close to the normal age, and have no unusual skin pigmentation. Diagnosis may be made only after decades. In other cases, children are diagnosed in early infancy, show obvious bone disease, and obvious increased endocrine secretions from several glands.

=== Skeletal abnormalities ===
All patients with known or suspected McCune–Albright syndrome should undergo a screening evaluation for fibrous dysplasia. Nuclear medicine tests such as technetium-99 scintigraphy are the most sensitive way to detect fibrous dysplasia lesions.

CT scan of the skull is the most useful test to evaluate craniofacial fibrous dysplasia. Regular hearing and vision screening is recommended. X-rays are usually sufficient to reveal fibrous dysplasia of the appendicular skeleton, but CT and/or MRI scans can reveal microfractures. Regular screening for scoliosis should also be undertaken.

=== Endocrine abnormalities ===
Patients with known or suspected McCune–Albright syndrome should undergo a screening evaluation for endocrine features.

Precocious puberty is typically diagnosed based on clinical presentation. A bone age examination should be performed to evaluation for skeletal maturation. Boys and men should have a screening testicular ultrasound.

Hyperthyroidism is diagnosed based on blood tests. A screening thyroid ultrasound exam may be performed.

Growth hormone excess is diagnosed using blood tests, such as insulin-like growth factor-1 levels. Monitoring growth rates alone is not sufficient to screen for growth hormone excess, because linear growth in children with McCune–Albright syndrome may be affected by skeletal deformities and other endocrinopathies.

Hypophosphatemia is diagnosed by blood phosphorus levels.

Cushing syndrome is very rare, and is typically diagnosed clinically in infants who present with signs of severe illness.

== Treatment ==
Treatment is dictated by both the tissues affected and the extent to which they are affected.

=== Skeletal abnormalities ===
Surgical management of skeletal abnormalities has evolved over the years. Surgical intervention may be necessary for some skeletal abnormalities. Bisphosphonates are helpful in relieving bone pain, but it is no longer believed that they prevent progression of the disease. Denosumab has been found successful in reducing bone pain and decreasing tumor growth, however there is limited safety data available in patients with fibrous dysplasia. Muscle strengthening exercises are important for preventing bone fractures; cycling and swimming are recommended in order to reduce the risk of fracture during exercise.

Screening and management of endocrinopathies is an important part of managing fibrous dysplasia. For example, untreated growth hormone excess increases the risk of craniofacial fibrous dysplasia expansion and may lead to vision loss. Untreated hyperthyroidism and hypophosphatemia increases the risk of fractures and skeletal deformities.

=== Endocrine abnormalities ===
For treatment of precocious puberty, the aromatase inhibitor such as letrozole is effective at prevent bleeding episodes and preventing short stature. In boys, these should be combined with drugs such as spironolactone and flutamide to treat androgen excess. Periodic ultrasounds of testicular lesions should be performed to screen for cancer.

Hyperthyroidism is managed with medications such as thioamides. However, because hyperthyroidism in McCune–Albright syndrome does not resolve, surgery or radiation are more definitive treatments. Periodic thyroid examination should be performed to screen for thyroid cancer.

Oral phosphate and calcitriol may be given for treatment of hypophosphatemia.

For growth hormone excess, treatment with somatostatin analogues or pegvisomant may be effective. Surgery may be an option, but may be complicated by the cranial abnormalities associated with the disorder. Excessive prolactin secretion may also occur; this is treated with dopamine agonists such as cabergoline. Radiation therapy has been associated with malignant transformation of skull base fibrous dysplasia, and should be avoided in all but the most dire cases.

Cushing syndrome is a rare but potentially fatal complication that can occur in the first year of life. Adrenalectomy is the treatment of choice. Metyrapone may also be used for treatment.

== Epidemiology ==
McCune–Albright syndrome is estimated to occur at a frequency between 1 in 100,000 to 1 in 1,000,000 individuals worldwide.

== See also ==
- List of cutaneous conditions
- List of radiographic findings associated with cutaneous conditions
