= Mikhail Iampolski =

Mikhail Beneaminovich Iampolski (Russian: Михаил Бениаминович Ямпольский) is a full professor of comparative literature and Russian and Slavic studies at New York University. He is the author of The Memory of Tiresias.

== Life and work ==
Iampolski gained a BA in 1971 at the Moscow Pedagogical Institute and a PhD in French Philosophy in 1977 at the Russian Academy of Pedagogical Sciences.

He has taught at Harvard University, University of Lausanne, and at the Moscow State Institute of Cinema Arts.

He has held the position of Getty Scholar at the J. Paul Getty Center for the History of Arts and the Humanities.

== Awards ==
- Andrej Bely Award for the best book in Humanities.

== Publications ==
- The Memory of Tiresias: Intertextuality and Film.
  - 1993. Russian language edition.
  - Oakland, CA: University of California Press, 1998. ISBN 978-0520085305. English language edition. Translated by Harsha Ram.

== Contributions to publications ==
- Socialist realism without shores. Durham, NC: Duke University Press, 1997. ISBN 9780822319412. Edited by Thomas Lahusen and Evgeny Dobrenko. Iampolski contributes a chapter, "Censorship as the triumph of life".
- Russia on reels: the Russian idea in post-Soviet cinema. London; New York: I.B. Tauris, 1999. ISBN 9781860643903. Edited by Birgit Beumers. Iampolski contributes a chapter, "Representation--mimicry--death: the latest films of Alexander Sokurov".
- The body of the line: Eisenstein's drawings. New York: The Drawing Center, 2000. Catalog of an exhibition held at The Drawing Center, New York, N.Y. from January 22-March 18, 2000. Iampolski contributes "Sphere, spiral, circle".
- Re: the Rainbow. Frankfurt am Main Revolver, Archiv für Aktuelle Kunst Lund Propexus, 2004. ISBN 9783865880499. Edited by Aris Fioretos.
- The cinema of Alexander Sokurov. London; New York: I.B. Tauris, 2011. Edited by Birgit Beumers and Nancy Condee. Iampolski contributes a chapter, "Truncated families and absolute intimacy".
- Pastoral / Moscow Suburbs. Rome: Contrasto, 2013. ISBN 978-8869654695. Photographs by Alexander Gronsky. Iampolski contributes a short essay, "Alexander Gronsky: Givenness without the Given".
