= Sarah Meister =

American curator and arts leader

Sarah Meister is an American curator and author, currently serving as the executive director of Aperture. She joined the organization in May 2021 after spending over twenty-five years at the Museum of Modern Art (MoMA) in New York.

== Early life and education ==
Meister earned her AB in Art History from Princeton University.

== Career ==
Meister began her career at MoMA, where she curated numerous exhibitions focusing on photography and modernist movements.

Meister has led efforts to reissue Robert Frank’s The Americans (1959) as an Aperture title, and, with editor in chief Michael Famighetti, oversaw a refresh of Aperture magazine’s design in summer 2024. She played a key role in Aperture’s acquisition of its new headquarters.

In addition to her curatorial work, Meister was the lead instructor for the online course “Seeing Through Photographs,” served as co-director of the August Sander Project, and is the founding host of the Aperture PhotoBook Club.

== Selected exhibitions ==
Some of her notable exhibitions include:

- Fotoclubismo: Brazilian Modernist Photography, 1946–1964 (2021)
- Dorothea Lange: Words & Pictures (2020)
- Making Space: Women Artists and Postwar Abstraction (co-curator, 2017)
- One and One Is Four: The Bauhaus Photocollages of Josef Albers (2016)
- From Bauhaus to Buenos Aires: Grete Stern and Horacio Coppola (co-curator, 2015)
- Bill Brandt: Shadow and Light (2013)
