= Alexander Gronsky =

Russian landscape photographer (born 1980)

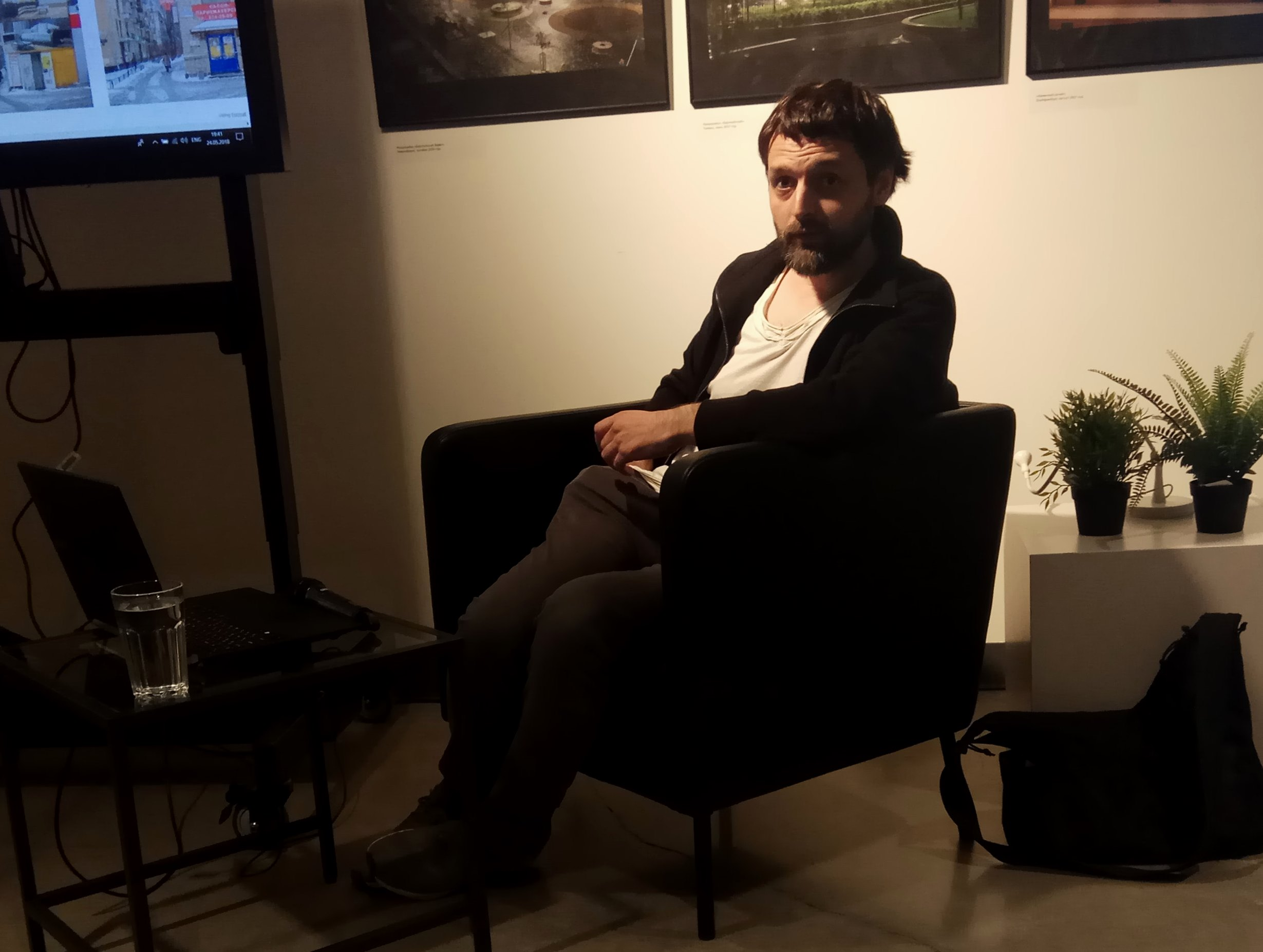
Alexander Gronsky in 2018

Alexander Gronsky (Александр Гронский, born 1980) is a Russian landscape photographer. His photographs of the Russian landscape have been shown in solo exhibitions, received awards, and were published in the book Pastoral (2013). He is based in Riga, Latvia.

== Life and work ==
Gronsky was born in Tallinn, Estonia. He became an assistant to a commercial photographer at age 17. In 1998, aged 18, he left Estonia. Between 1999 and 2008 he worked as a press photographer for Russian and international media, covering Russia and the former USSR. He joined the Photographer.ru agency in 2003 and in 2006 moved to Russia. He works commercially for advertising agencies, corporations and humanitarian organisations.

Since 2008 Gronsky has been oriented more on personal projects focusing on how geography influences the emotions and behaviour of its inhabitants, particularly those residing in the Russian landscape: Less Than One (2006-2009), a portrait of Russia's outermost regions, areas with a population density of less than one person per square kilometer; Endless Night (2007-2009), Murmansk, the largest city within the Arctic Circle, where the harsh winter is exacerbated by two months of night-time; The Edge (2008-2010), the same outskirts of Moscow as Pastoral only in winter; Mountains and Waters (2011), a study of China in which the mist and cloud that pervade the photos allude to traditional Chinese painting but the subject matter is contemporary: new housing, infrastructure and construction, in diptychs; Pastoral (2008-2012), explores the suburbs between Moscow and the countryside that surrounds it, evoking man's encounter with nature – picnickers eat beside heavy industry, sunbathers lie next to construction sites, and people stroll past piles of urban detritus; and Norilsk (2013).

Gronsky's book Pastoral was published in 2013. As Mikhail Iampolski, professor of Russian and Slavic Studies, writes in the introduction, "The title of the cycle is ironic. A pastoral always depicts a rural idyll, in contrast to the life of city dwellers, to whom it is addressed. In Gronsky’s cycle, the cardinal difference between the rural, the natural and the urban is lifted. This particular pastoral is not about a contrast, but about an indefinite transition." The critic Sean O'Hagan, reviewing Pastoral in The Observer, said "It is essentially, a book about how people use – and abuse – the precious green spaces available to them." Gronsky says he spent two years familiarising himself with all the suburbs of Moscow and a further two years photographing those he considered interesting. Rather than use a large format camera with a tripod as is typical for this style of photography, he kept his equipment to a minimum, using just a portable Mamiya 7 camera. This portability meant he did not look like a photographer, and gave him greater agility whilst composing to react to peoples' movements. Genevieve Fussell, writing in The New Yorker, said the work included "measured compositions and a deft use of color". O'Hagan also said "In photography, the edgeland has also become a prevailing subject in recent years, ... If this is much travelled-territory, Gronsky nevertheless makes it his own." Alexander Strecker, writing in LensCulture, said "Gronsky is a landscape photographer at heart. His skillful use of perspective and talent for composition lead the observer’s eye deeply into the landscape, generating a sense of astonishment for every place portrayed in photo. But simple astonishment deepens into something more complex as we take in the layered images".

== Publications ==
- Contact Sheet 166: Alexander Gronsky. Syracuse, NY: Light Work, 2012. ISBN 978-0935445787.
- Pastoral / Moscow Suburbs. Rome: Contrasto, 2013. ISBN 978-8869654695. Mikhail Iampolski contributes a short essay, "Alexander Gronsky: Givenness without the Given".
- Less than One. Tokyo: Tycoon Books, 2014. Edition of 500, ISBN 978-4-9906628-4-4. Special edition of 15, ISBN 978-4-9906628-5-1.
- Norilsk. Taipei: The Velvet Cell, 2015. ISBN 978-1-908889-25-6. Edition of 500.
- Mountains and Waters. Taipei: The Velvet Cell, 2016. ISBN 978-1-908889-35-5. Edition of 750 copies.
- Alexander Gronsky, Ksenia Babushkina. Schema. Rīga: Orbīta, 2016. ISBN 978-9934-8476-3-9. Edition of 700

== Exhibitions ==
=== Solo exhibitions ===
- 2011: Mountains & Waters, Photo Levallois festival, Levallois, France; Polka Galerie, Paris, 2012.
- 2012: Pastoral, Light Work, Syracuse, NY; The Wapping Project, London, 14 April – 12 June 2015.

=== Exhibitions with others ===
- 2009: Minus Ideology, Art+Art Gallery, Moscow.
- 2009: InsideOutside, FotoWeekDC Festival, Washington, DC.
- 2010: Eastside Story, Polka Gallery, Paris.
- 2011: SI Fest Photography Festival, Savignano sul Rubicone, Italy.
- 2011: Territories of Desire, Backlight Photo Festival, Tampere Art Museum, Tampere, Finland.
- 2011: Crossroads: Contemporary Russian Photography, Australian Centre for Photography, Sydney.

== Awards ==
- 2003: Participant, World Press Photo Joop Swart Masterclass, Amsterdam.
- 2004: Highly commended, Ian Parry Scholarship, UK.
- 2008: Finalist, Kandinsky Prize, Moscow.
- 2009: 1st prize, Linhof Young Photographer Award 09.
- 2009: Winner, 2009 Aperture Portfolio Prize, Aperture Foundation, for The Edge.
- 2009: Top 50, Critical Mass, Photo Lucida.
- 2010: Grand Prix, Silver Camera, Moscow House of Photography, Moscow.
- 2010: Winner, Foam Paul Huf Award, Foam Fotografiemuseum Amsterdam, for The Edge.
- 2011: Winner, Levallois – Epson 2011 Photography Prize, for Mountains and Waters. €10000 grant and exhibition in the Photo Levallois festival.
- 2012: Pastoral, 3rd place, Daily Life, Stories, World Press Photo Awards 2012.
