= Donovan (disambiguation) =

Donovan is a Scottish singer, songwriter, and guitarist.

Donovan may also refer to:

== People and fictional characters ==
- Donovan (given name), a list of people and fictional characters with the given name
- Donovan (surname), a list of people and fictional characters with the surname

== Places ==
- General Donovan Department, Argentina
- Castle Donovan, a ruined castle east of Bantry, County Cork, Ireland
- Donovan, Georgia, United States
- Donovan, Illinois, United States
- Donovan Lake, Minnesota, United States

== Ships ==
- HMS Donovan (1918), a minesweeper launched in 1918, sold in 1921
- Empire Battleaxe, an Infantry Landing Ship that operated as HMS Donovan from 1944 to 1946

== Other uses ==
- Donovan (album)
- "Donovan", a song from the 1990 album Pills 'n' Thrills and Bellyaches by Happy Mondays
- Donovan (horse), winner of the 1889 Epsom Derby
- Donovan Data Systems, a software and computer services company
- DoNovAn, the original broadcast title of the 2004 British TV series DNA

== See also ==
- HMS Donovan (album), a 1971 album by Donovan
- Donovans, South Australia, Australia
- Donovans, Newfoundland and Labrador, Canada
- Donavan (disambiguation)
- Donavon (disambiguation)
- O'Donovan (disambiguation)
- O'Donovan (surname)
