= Monostotic fibrous dysplasia =

Replacement of a single bone by fibrous tissue

- Other names: Jaffe-Lichtenstein syndrome, monostotic osteitis fibrosa
- Specialty: Rheumatology

Monostotic fibrous dysplasia is a form of fibrous dysplasia where only one bone is involved. It comprises a majority of the cases of fibrous dysplasia (approximately 70–80%).

It is a rare bone disease characterized by the replacement of normal elements of the bone by fibrous connective tissue, which can cause very painful swellings and bone deformities, and make bone abnormally fragile and prone to fracture.

A congenital, noninherited, benign anomaly of bone development in a single bone, it consists of the replacement of normal marrow and cancellous bone by immature bone with fibrous stroma. Monostotic fibrous dysplasia occurs with equal frequency in both sexes and normally develops early in life, with lesions frequently identified late in the first and early second decades. Most patients are asymptomatic, with the diagnosis often established after an incidental finding or with pain, swelling, or fracture. Lesions usually enlarge in proportion to skeletal growth and the abnormal replacement remain active only until skeletal maturity.

Monostotic fibrous dysplasia does not convert into the polyostotic type. When symptoms are present, they often are nonspecific, including pain, swelling, or pathologic fracture. It most often affects the ribs (28%), proximal femur (23%), tibia, craniofacial bones (10-25%) and humerus (10-25%).

== See also ==
- Polyostotic fibrous dysplasia
