= Donavan =

Donavan is a masculine given name. Notable people with the name include:

- Donavan Freberg (born 1971), American advertising creative, voice actor, photographer, and writer
- Donavan Johnson (born 1985), American rapper, singer and songwriter
- Donavan McKinney (born 1992), American politician from Michigan
- Donavan Mitchem (born 1989), American activist
- Donavan Tate (born 1990), American minor league baseball player

== See also ==
- Donavon (disambiguation)
- Donovan (disambiguation)
