= Donavon Larson =

American football player and coach (1947–2004)

Biographical details
- Born: 1947
- Died: December 4, 2004 (aged 57)

Playing career
- 1965–1968: Hamline

Coaching career (HC unless noted)
- c. 1985: Albert Lea HS (MN)
- 1987–1996: North Dakota State (DL)
- 2001–2004: Hamline

Head coaching record
- Overall: 10–30 (college)

Donavon Lee Larson (1947 – December 4, 2004) was an American football player and coach. He served as the head football coach at his alma mater, Hamline University, from 2001 to 2004.

== Head coaching record ==
=== College ===
Year	Team	Overall	Conference	Standing	Bowl/playoffs
Hamline Pipers (Minnesota Intercollegiate Athletic Conference) (2001–2004)
2001	Hamline	2–8	2–7	8th	
2002	Hamline	3–7	2–6	7th	
2003	Hamline	2–8	0–8	9th	
2004	Hamline	3–7	1–7	T–8th	
Hamline:		10–30	5–28		
Total:		10–30			
