= Ed Donovan =

American actor (1931–2025)

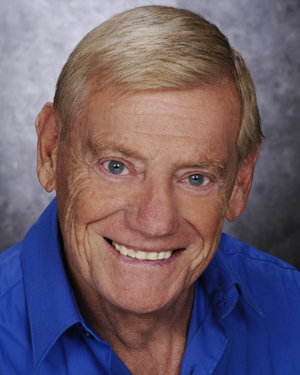
- Born: Edward Charles Donovan; December 14, 1931; Boston, Massachusetts, U.S.
- Died: August 30, 2025 (aged 93); Eustis, Florida, U.S.
- Occupation: Actor
- Years active: 1951–2013

Edward Charles Donovan (December 14, 1931 – August 30, 2025) was an American actor and the editor of In Focus Magazine, Florida's film, television and the arts industry magazine. A former Boston police officer, Donovan was the subject of a biographical non-fiction book called The Shattered Badge. The title comes from his working in founding and operating the Boston Police Stress Program, a program for policemen by policemen to deal with their unique stress problems. Donovan was a featured interview in the HBO documentary Cops: Behind the Badge. He has been interviewed on several talk shows including the Phil Donahue Show and The Oprah Winfrey Show.

== Biography ==
Donovan was a retired 32-year veteran Boston police officer with special training in photography, crime scene investigation, crisis intervention, hostage negotiations and firearms. He worked in homicide, intelligence, undercover in protests, riots, stings and drug raids.

Donovan was the director and founder of the Boston Police Stress Program, the first peer-counseling program in the world for law enforcement officers and their families under stress.

Donovan was the president of the International Law Enforcement Stress Association, on the Board of Directors of The American Institute of Stress, The International Institute of Stress, a National Speaker, trainer and consultant to several law enforcement agencies.

He has been interviewed by several radio talk shows internationally. Donovan has also appeared on television, including Phil Donahue, Oprah Winfrey, Dick Cavett and the Today Show with Jane Pauley. Charlie Rose, Night watch, Ed Bradley, Tom Brokaw. Donovan was featured in the HBO Special Cops Behind the Badge, the ABC Special The Shattered Badge and The “5th Estate” Canada.

Donovan has been interviewed by the U.S. News & World Report, Time, Newsweek, several international police magazines and several other leading newspapers. He has lectured at venues including West Point, Harvard University, University of Notre Dame, FBI National Academy and several other local and state law enforcement agencies throughout the United States and Canada.

Donovan was a featured speaker with five Nobel Peace Prize winners at a World Conference on Stress in Monaco, France, in 1978.

He has been a consultant to several organizations for stress management and burnout.

Donovan wrote, produced, and directed training films and videos in the US Navy and the Boston Police Department. He wrote, directed and was featured in Choir Practice a training video on stress for law enforcement officers. He has published four tapes to date “Police Suicide, the Ultimate Cop Out”, “Burnout in the Helping Profession”, “Speaking of Criminal Justice, An Interview with Ed Donovan”, “Stress and Burnout” and “Speaking on Police Stress”.

Donovan was the founder, publisher and editor of Police Stress, an international journal.

A book on the Donovan's life was written by Canadian TV Producer William Kankett and co-authored by Donovan, The Shattered Badge, The Story of Ed Donovan, Stress Cop.

Donovan died on August 30, 2025, at the age of 93.

== Post-retirement ==
Since retiring, Donovan continued to lecture on police stress throughout the US and Canada.

He also pursued a career in acting, screenwriting, producing, casting and directing. He attended classes in screenwriting, acting and episodic television production at Manatee Community College, University of Central Florida and Valencia Community College.

Acting credits include as a stand in for Steve McQueen in The Thomas Crown Affair (1967), with Norman Jewison, The Frogmen (1952) with Samuel C. Engel, Virgins (2000), Hereditary Misfortune (2002), Monster (2003) with Oscar winner Charlize Theron, Drowning (2003), The Price (2008), Acts of Mercy (2009) and The Tenant (2009).

Has appeared in numerous commercials and television shows including In Search of (2000), Sheena (2000), Dr G: Medical Examiner and Skeleton Stories. Donovan is the editor of In Focus Magazine, Florida's film, television and the arts industry magazine. He has interviewed such celebrities as Jay Leno, Ernest Borgnine, Arnold Schwarzenegger and Oscar winner Adrien Brody.

He was a member of the Screen Actors Guild and Women in Film and Television and the Boston Police Patrolman's Retired Officers Association.

== See also ==
- Ed Donovan (engine builder)
