= Donovan Bennett =

Jamaican criminal and gang leader

Donovan "Bulbie" Bennett
- Born: c. 1964; King Street, Spanish Town, St. Catherine, Jamaica
- Died: October 30, 2005; Tanakay district, Rock River, Clarendon, Jamaica
- Cause of death: Gun battle with police/military
- Other name: Bulbie
- Occupations: Gang leader, Criminal
- Known for: Leader of the Klansman gang, Jamaica's most wanted criminal
- Allegiance: Klansman (or Klans Massive) gang
- Criminal charges: Murder extortion assault,
- Capture status: Killed during apprehension attempt
- Wanted by: Jamaica Constabulary Force, Operation Kingfish

Details
- Weapon: .50 Desert Eagle

Donovan "Bulbie" Bennett (c. 1964 – 30 October 2005) was a Jamaican criminal and gang leader of the Klansman (or Klans Massive) based in Spanish Town, St. Catherine. He was formerly listed by the Jamaica Constabulary Force as number one of Jamaica's top ten most wanted criminals for over ten years before his death.

== Background ==
Born in King Street, Spanish Town, Bennett gradually built up a criminal empire through murder and extortion whose assets included eighty motor vehicles and heavy equipment used in construction and hauling industries throughout Jamaica. A member of the Clansmen, authorities believe he gained leadership through the murder of then leader Derrick "Puppy String" Eccleston on 12 May 1993. During the early 1990s, he led the gang against their rivals the One Order Gang resulting in numerous gangland shootings and other violence in Spanish Town.

He later established an elaborate extortion operations targeting local business, particularly taximen, in both the central and south central regions of St. Catherine. He would later be connected to criminal activities in Old Harbour and Portmore, St. Catherine and May Pen.

He was thought to have briefly fled from authorities in Kingston to Great Britain under a false identity in 2001.

== Death ==
Refusing to surrender to authorities, he and his driver were finally killed (and a man taken into custody) in a gun battle against members of a joint police/military operation part of Operation Kingfish who attempted to bring him in for questioning on his alleged involvement in eighty unsolved homicides as well as charges of assault and extortion at his home in Tanakay district of Rock River, Clarendon. At the time of his death, his wealth was estimated at $100 million (Bennett's weapon, a .50 Desert Eagle, was found to be worth $2,000).

Later investigations under Superintendent Kenneth Wade found cooperation between Bennett and members of the People's National Party, of which he was given political support and supplied him with information while he operated in areas dominated by the party.

During the days following his death, members of his gang reacted violently to his death from blocking roads to firing upon the Spanish Town Police Station and burning effigies of National Security Minister, Dr. Peter Phillips.
