= Claire Donovan =

British historian and academic (1948–2019)

Claire Marie Donovan FSA
- Born: 12 February 1948
- Died: 5 June 2019 (aged 71)
- Occupations: Lecturer; Academic; Historian
- Spouse: Colin Platt (m. 1996–2015)

Academic background
- Education: Somerville College, Oxford; University of East Anglia
- Thesis: The early development of the illustrated book of hours in England, c. 1240-1350 (1981)

Claire Marie Donovan FSA RA FRHistS (née Baker; 12 February 1948 – 5 June 2019) was a British historian and academic.

== Career ==
Donovan was educated in Oxford before studying an undergraduate degree in English and History of Art at the University of London. She gained a Postgraduate diploma from Somerville College, Oxford and a PhD from the University of East Anglia. Her PhD thesis, "The Early Development of the Illustrated Book of Hours in England, c. 1240–1350," was filed in 1981.

She was vice principal of Dartington College of Arts, an Honorary Research Fellow in the College of Humanities at the University of Exeter, a Council member of the Devon History Society, a Trustee of Poltimore House Trust and Chair of the South West Association of Preservation Trusts.

== Personal life ==
In 1996, she married Colin Platt, a historian, archaeologist and academic.

== Doctoral thesis and select publications ==
- Baker, C. M. 1981. "The Early Development of the Illustrated book of Hours in England, c. 1240–1350" (unpublished Ph.D. thesis).
- Donovan, C. 1991. The de Brailes Hours: shaping the book of hours in 13th-century Oxford. London, British Library.
- Donovan, C. and Bushnell, J. 1996. John Everett Millais, 1829–1896: a centenary exhibition. Southampton, Media Arts Faculty Institute.
- Donovan, C. 2000. The Winchester Bible. Winchester, Winchester Cathedral.
- Donovan, C. 2005. Review of Kathryn A. Smith, Art, Identity and Devotion in Fourteenth-Century England: Three Women and their Books of Hours (London: The British Library/Toronto: U. of Toronto Press, 2003), in English Historical Review CXX, no. 486, pp. 203–05.
- Donovan, C. and Hemmings, J. 2014. "Evidence for Eighteenth-Century Rebuilding at Poltimore House: Interpreting Edmund Prideaux’s Drawings, 1716 and 1727", The Devon Historian 83.
