= Gerard O'Donovan =

Irish author (born 1958)

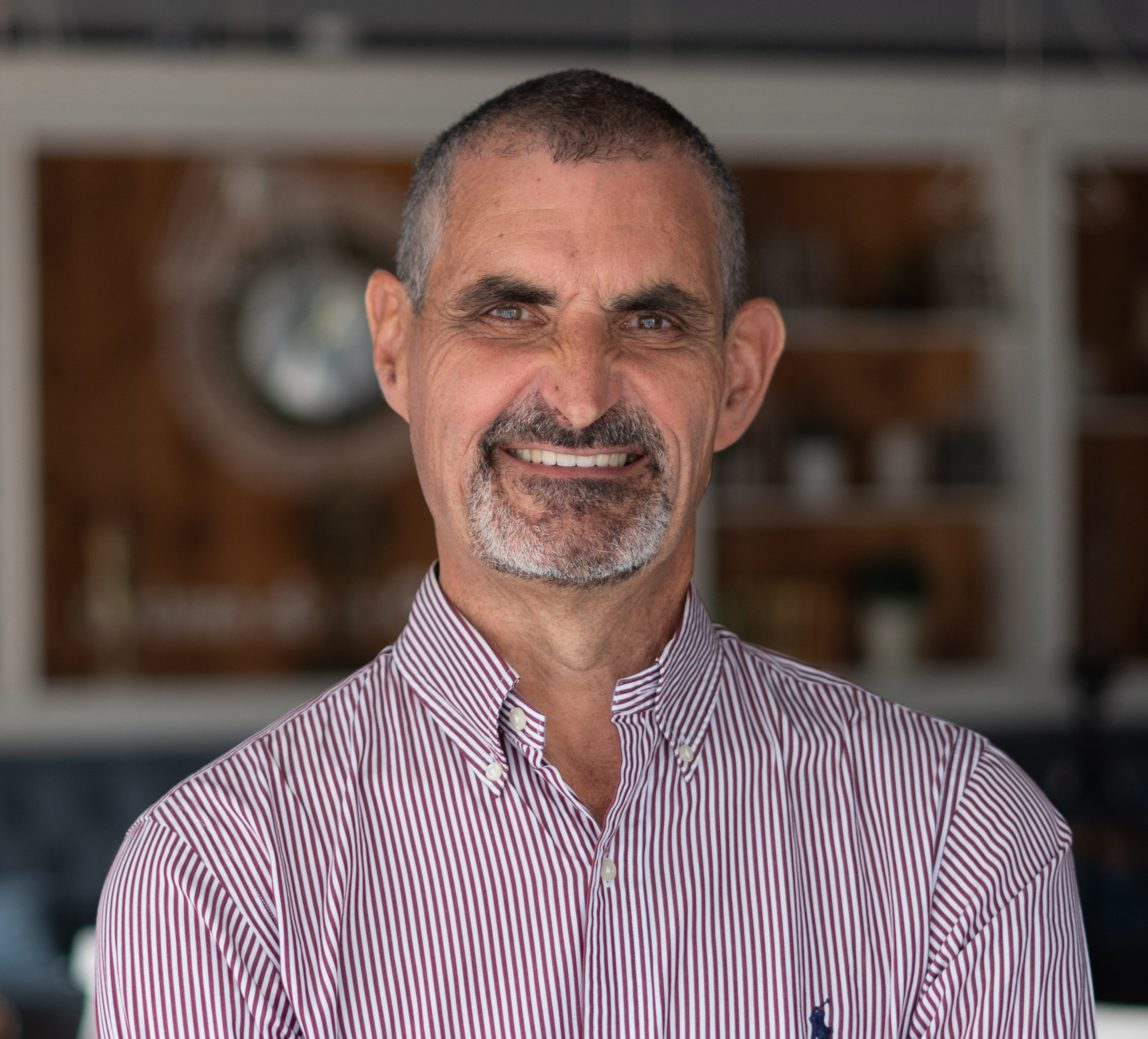
- Born: 16 April 1958 (age 67); Ireland
- Occupation: Author
- Known for: Coach training

Gerard O'Donovan (born 16 April 1958) is the founder and CEO of Noble Manhattan Coaching; and has written a number of books on coaching.

O'Donovan has appeared on the BBC, Fox News, Romanian Television and in The Irish Times.

== Early life ==
Born in Bantry, County Cork, Ireland, O'Donovan attended Bantry Primary School and Bantry Secondary School. At the age of 17, he joined the Royal Marines, and spent nine years in the Royal Marines Commandos. Later, while serving in the Royal Marines, he participated at The Open University.

== Career ==
After studying Psychology and Business, in 1993, O'Donovan founded Noble Manhattan Personal Development, which later became Noble Manhattan Coaching, now part of the Noble Manhattan group.

O'Donovan is best known for his coaching models and theories such as leadership development theory and leadership growth model.

He has been the non-executive Director and past president of the International Authority for Professional Coaching and Mentoring, IAPC&M - International Authority for Professional Coaching & Mentoring and a founding director of the International Regulator for Coaching and Mentoring.

== Personal life ==
He lives with his family in Weymouth, Dorset, England. O'Donovan is married and has three children.

== Books ==
O'Donovan is the author of the books:

- The 30 Minute Life Coach (2000)
- A Coaches Story (2011)
- Voices of Experience, together with Jacqui Harper (2005)
- Good Questions!, co-authored with Judy Barber (2005)
- Jacqui Harper, Voices of Experience (2005)
- David Miskimin and Jack Stewart, The Coaching Parent, foreword written by Gerard O'Donovan (2006)
