= Donovan Woods =

Donovan Woods may refer to:

- Donovan Woods (American football) (born 1985), American former football linebacker
- Donovan Woods (musician), Canadian folk and country singer-songwriter
