= Donavan Mitchem =

Donavan Mitchem (born c. 1989) is an American from Chicago, noted for political activism, including a stint as a television correspondent on The Oprah Winfrey Show.

At age 7, Mitchem talked his way into the 1996 Democratic National Convention in Chicago. Mitchem picketed in front of the United Center for more than four hours with a placard reading "Let me in, DNC. Let me in." Given a pass from a representative of the Transport Workers Union of America, it took another three hours to convince security to let his mother and him in on the same pass. Once inside, he attracted the interest of the press. Afterward, Oprah Winfrey made Donavan a correspondent, and he covered President Bill Clinton’s victory speech in Little Rock, attended his inauguration in Washington, D.C., and attended the 2000 DNC as a guest of Clinton.

By age 11, Mitchem had been President of the "Purple Kiddy Group" at Rainbow/PUSH, and had written for the Chicago Defender.

In 2000 Mitchem served as an ambassador for the United States at the United Nations as part of the Millennium Dreamers Program. Mitchem attended a special session of the UN General Assembly as a guest of Nan Annan, wife of former Secretary General Kofi Annan.

In addition to his history as an activist, Mitchem has been an actor since the age of 7, appearing in national ad campaigns for Tost'em breakfast pastries, Payless Shoe Source and Connor Prairie museums. In 2001 Mitchem starred in "Christmas Carol" at Chicago's Goodman Theatre.

Mitchem graduated from University of Chicago Laboratory Schools in June 2007. He currently attends DePaul University. He writes for the blog "Cornbread and Matzah" under the name Hi-Fi, and also serves as a chief research analyst for the National Black Leadership Forum in Washington D.C.

== Quotes ==
- "Kids don’t have a voice in the political process in this country."
