= Donavon Smallwood =

American photographer

Donavon Smallwood (born 1994) is an American photographer, living in New York City. His first book is Languor (2021).

== Life and work ==
Smallwood was born, grew up and continues to live in Harlem, New York City. He studied documentary film and English literature at Hunter College in New York.

Languor (2021) is a book of portraits of people and photographs of nature made in Central Park, Manhattan during the COVID-19 pandemic, using a medium format film camera. Smallwood says "Its subject is what it's like to be a black person in nature." In 2021 the book won the Aperture Portfolio Prize and the work was exhibited at the Camera Club of New York and as part of the Taylor Wessing Photographic Portrait Prize in London.

== Publications ==
- Languor. Trespasser, 2021. ISBN 978-0-578907-59-8. Edition of 1500 copies.
