= John O'Donovan =

John O'Donovan may refer to:

- John O'Donovan (scholar) (1806–1861), Irish language scholar and place-name expert
- John O'Donovan (politician) (1908–1982), Irish TD and Senator
- John O'Donovan (police commissioner) (1858–1927), New Zealand police commissioner
- John O'Donovan (Gaelic footballer) (1889–1920), Irish footballer
- John Francis O'Donovan (1918–1999), Irish chess master
- John O'Donovan, guitarist with The Adolescents punk band

== See also ==
- John Donovan (disambiguation)
