= Daniel Donovan (New Hampshire politician) =

American politician

Member of New Hampshire House of Representatives for Hillsborough 2
- In office 2014 – December 4, 2018.
- Succeeded by: Keith Erf
- In office 2010–2012

Personal details
- Party: Republican

Daniel A. Donovan is an American politician. He was a member of the New Hampshire House of Representatives and represented Grafton 14th district.
