= Prue O'Donovan =

Australian priest

Prudence Estelle O’Donovan (1 April 1950 – 9 November 2023) was Archdeacon of Flinders in the Anglican Diocese of Willochra from 2009 to 2015 and Ministry Development Officer (2012–2015).

O’Donovan was deaconed in 1999 and ordained priest in 2000 for the Diocese of Adelaide.
