= Jack Donovan (footballer) =

Australian rules footballer, born 1908

Personal information
- Full name: Jack Donovan
- Born: 17 January 1908
- Died: 12 December 1964 (aged 56)
- Original team: Newport CYMS (CYMSFA)

Playing career^{1}
| Years | Club | Games (Goals) |
| 1929 | Footscray | 1 (0) |
| 1930 | North Melbourne | 6 (3) |
| Total | | 7 (3) |
- ^{1} Playing statistics correct to the end of 1930.

Jack Donovan (17 January 1908 – 12 December 1964) was a former Australian rules footballer who played with Footscray and North Melbourne in the Victorian Football League (VFL).
