= Donovan Lake =

Lake in the state of Minnesota, United States

- Location within Minnesota
- Location: Benton County, Minnesota
- Coordinates: 45°34′24″N 94°3′44″W
- Type: lake

Donovan Lake is a lake in Benton County, Minnesota, in the United States.

Donovan Lake was named for John Donovan, a farmer who settled nearby.

== See also ==
- List of rivers of Minnesota
