= Donovan James McCune =

- Born: 24 June 1902; Bellefontaine, Ohio, US
- Died: 11 April 1976 (aged 73); Vallejo, California, US
- Education: Johns Hopkins School of Medicine (MD, 1928)
- Occupation: Pediatrician
- Years active: 1933–1966
- Known for: Pioneering research on McCune–Albright syndrome
- Spouse: Mary Adams

Academic work
- Main interests: Rare book collecting; letterpress printing

Donovan James McCune (June 24, 1902 – April 11, 1976) was an American pediatrician who conducted pioneering research on McCune–Albright syndrome. He was also a collector of rare books, including many incunabula, and a devotee of letterpress printing.

== Early life and education ==
McCune was born in Bellefontaine, Ohio, to Christopher James McCune and Laura Miller McCune.

He graduated in 1920 from St. Rose High School in Lima, Ohio, and attended the University of Dayton from 1920 to 1921. He earned a bachelor's degree in 1924 from Georgetown University and obtained his medical degree in 1928 from Johns Hopkins School of Medicine. He once wrote: "Georgetown has meant many things to me: I shall name only two: a durable interest in public speaking, and a devotion to the Latin language and literature. These still constitute my most absorbing avocation, not only supplying intellectual recreation, but also providing focus for book collecting, fine printing, and bookbinding."

He was married to Mary Adams, also a doctor, from October 14, 1932, until 1951. The couple had no children.

== Medical career ==
McCune began his medical career as an intern at Willard Parker Hospital in New York City, where he worked for two months in 1928. He then went to the Harriet Lane Home at Johns Hopkins Hospital from 1928 to 1929. He was a resident physician in pediatrics and contagious diseases at Cincinnati General Hospital from 1929 to 1930, and then a resident physician at Babies Hospital in New York from 1930 to 1934. From 1933 to 1942, he was chief of clinic at the Vanderbilt Clinic in New York and director of its chemical laboratory, and from 1942 to 1951 he was an attending physician at Babies Hospital.

McCune was a consultant in pediatrics at Greenwich Hospital in Connecticut (1943), at Holy Name Hospital in Teaneck, New Jersey (1946–52), and at Stamford Hospital in Connecticut (1947–52).

During the 1930s and 1940s, in addition to practicing medicine, McCune worked as a professor. He was an associate in pediatrics at the Columbia University College of Physicians and Surgeons from 1931 to 1937, and then an assistant professor (1937–42), associate professor (1942–44), professor (1944), and member of the faculty of medicine at Columbia (1945–51).

In 1951, McCune began to work as a physician at Kaiser Permanente Hospital in Vallejo, California. He was the chief of pediatrics and physician-in-chief there from 1953 to 1965. In 1965, he was appointed as the staff assistant to Dr. Cecil Cutting, executive director of the Permanente Medical Group in Oakland, California. McCune was also a consultant in pediatrics for the U.S. Navy hospital at Mare Island (1957–58) and for David Grant Hospital on Travis Air Force Base (1966–68).

Internationally, McCune was involved in two medical missions: a 1946 Unitarian Service Committee/UNRRA mission to Poland, and a 1948 Unitarian Service Committee mission to Colombia.

=== McCune–Albright syndrome ===
McCune–Albright syndrome, a rare genetic endocrine disease affecting the bones and pigmentation of the skin, was described independently by both McCune and Dr. Fuller Albright in 1937.

McCune wrote more than thirty articles for medical publications and contributed to the Childcraft encyclopedia (1946 and 1954) and Encyclopedia Americana (1955). In addition, he coauthored M.B. Howorth's Textbook of Orthopedics (1952).

== Book collecting and hobbies ==
In 1961, the Vallejo City Council appointed McCune to the Vallejo Public Library Board, and in 1966, he was reappointed to another five-year term. He was a leader in the fund-raising efforts for a new library in Vallejo. The groundbreaking for the library, named after John F. Kennedy, took place on September 4, 1968, and McCune commemorated the occasion with a broadsheet that he printed using his own hand press. That same year, he joined the California Library Association.

McCune's book collection reflected a wide range of interests: Latin and Greek literature; printing in all its aspects (ink, paper, movable type, and binding); fine printers (e.g., Grabhorn Press, Plantin Press, Nonesuch Press, Henry Evans, John Henry Nash, and Valenti Angelo); Californiana; and limited-edition publications of the Book Club of California. His collection also included magazines on the printing arts (e.g., The Fleuron, The Bookbinder, The Book-Collector's Quarterly, The Colophon, Imprint, and The Monotype Recorder) and ephemera from fine printing presses.

=== Bookbinding ===
McCune took up bookbinding in 1960 as a way to save money. By June 1963, he had bound more than 200 volumes and about 100 cases to contain the valuable items in his collection. He rebound many of his favorite books in leather. In addition, McCune often requested unbound copies of books, pamphlets, and other materials from printers so that he could do the binding himself. He stamped the spines of his rebound books with his personal mark: a gold beagle with the inscription "Beagle Press", in honor of his pet beagle, You-You.

=== Printing ===
McCune started his own hand-printing enterprise early in 1968. As a gift upon his retirement from Kaiser Permanente, he chose an Adana Horizontal Quarto Printing Press. He described his early foray into hand-printing: "Early in this new career — now three months old — I printed an apprentice-piece, Ad Dante, embodying the only Latin verses I have ever had the nerve to write — and that nearly fifty years ago. The presswork was atrocious." He then took lessons from Roger Levenson at the Tamalpais Press.

In July 1968, McCune obtained an iron and steel Albion press, manufactured in London in 1852 by Hopkinson & Cope, the latter having invented it around 1820. The machine stood approximately six feet six inches in height and weighed just under 2,000 pounds. Because it was so large and McCune was only about five foot six, he had a platform built on which he could stand to operate the press. The plumed finial on top frequently sported a beret to add to the informality of McCune's printing operation.

McCune used his presses to print various hand-made publications and broadsheets. Although he enjoyed printing, he wrote in one letter that when he printed 100 copies of a single broadsheet (as he did for the Roxburghe Club), he found it exceedingly tedious.

== Clubs and societies ==
While living in New York, McCune was a member of the Harvey Society, whose stated purpose was to establish a closer relationship between the practical side of medicine and the results of laboratory research.

McCune joined the Vallejo Chamber of Commerce in 1957 and was the chairman of its Committee on Public Relations from 1959 to 1960. In 1960, he became a member of the Board of Directors of the Solano County Legal Aid Society. In 1965, as a representative of the Legal Aid Society, he served on the Solano County Council of Economic Opportunity.

== Death and legacy ==
McCune died on April 11, 1976, in Vallejo, California. He bequeathed all of his rare books, printing presses, and bookbinding tools to the City of Vallejo. His full collection of art and rare books is now housed in the "McCune Room" of the city's John F. Kennedy Library.

In 1988, the Roxburghe Club of San Francisco and the Zamorano Club commemorated a re-awakening of the Beagle Press by hand-printing 250 copies of The Beagle Press Recidivus. The first 125 were given out as keepsakes for members of the Roxburghe and Zamorano Clubs who visited the McCune collection in the Vallejo library on October 1, 1988. The copies were designed and printed by Roxburghe Club members Al Newman, Gordon Williams, and Thomas Woodhouse on the McCune collection's Albion hand press.
