= Amy Elkins =

American photographer

Amy Elkins (born 1979) is an American photographer based in California. She received her Bachelor of Fine Arts in photography from the School of Visual Arts in New York City. Her photographs are formal portraits, through which she captures intimacy while exploring masculinity, vulnerability, and identity. Elkins has several series including Elegant Violence, Danseur, Wallflower, Parting Words, and Black is the Day, Black is the Night. In 2014 she won the Aperture Portfolio Prize for her series Parting Words, a collection of black and white portraits of men and women who have been executed. Since 2005 Elkins has used incarceration as a theme. In 2020 Elkins was awarded a Cadogan Art Award presented by the SOMArts Cultural Center and the San Francisco Foundation.
