= Donovan Wilson =

Donovan Wilson may refer to:

- Donovan Wilson (American football) (born 1995), American football safety
- Donovan Wilson (footballer) (born 1997), English footballer
