= Donovan Ward =

South African artist (born 1962)

- Born: November 1962 (age 63); Cape Town, South Africa

Donovan Ward (born November 1962 in Western Cape, Cape Town, South Africa) is a South African artist who works in several media, including painting and sculpture.

Donovan's work is represented in private and public collections including the University of South Africa, Pretoria, and the Durban Art Gallery. Public Art commissions include the Gugulethu 7 memorial commissioned by the City of Cape Town and Provincial Government and the United Democratic Front Memorial.
