= Robert Donovan (cricketer) =

Irish cricketer

Personal information
- Full name: Robert Leo Donovan
- Born: 28 June 1899; Dublin, Ireland
- Died: 26 February 1932 (aged 33); Dublin, Ireland
- Batting: Left-handed
- Bowling: Left-arm medium
- Relatives: Edward Donavon (father)

Domestic team information
- Years: Team
- 1921: Ireland

Career statistics
Competition	First-class
Matches	1
Runs scored	3
Batting average	3.00
100s/50s	–/–
Top score	3
Catches/stumpings	–/–
- Source: Cricinfo, 3 January 2022

Robert Leo Donovan (20 June 1899, in Dublin – 26 February 1932, in Dublin) was an Irish cricketer. A left-handed batsman and left-arm medium pace bowler, he played just once for the Ireland cricket team, a first-class match against Scotland in August 1921, scoring three runs in the only innings, and not bowling.

His father, EJ Donovan, also represented Ireland at cricket.
