= Daniel Donovan (doctor) =

Irish doctor

- Died: February 1880
- Occupation: Doctor
- Known for: Sketches in Carbery

Daniel Donovan, author of Sketches in Carbery (1876) was a doctor of medicine in West Cork, Ireland. Dr Daniel Senior (1807–77), his father, was the famous Famine Doctor.

== Early life ==
Daniel Junior was the third son of Daniel and Henrietta Donovan (née Flynn). Having trained in medicine young Daniel joined the Royal Navy in 1863 as a medical officer but retired from the service four years later to return to West Cork and assist his (by then) ailing father. In the navy he saw much of the world, particularly the Americas (he was, for example, in the city of New Orleans when the American Civil War came to an end, and he was in Mexico during the revolution of 1867 when the Emperor Maximillian was dethroned and executed).

== Work and death ==
Donovan made contributions to several journals and magazines but is especially recognized for his pieces in The West Cork Eagle, the local newspaper, which is where the "Sketches" first appeared. These were collected and published as Sketches in Carbery in 1876 (Dublin, McGlashan & Gill). At the age of 37, the author took ill and died in February 1880 as a result of an infection picked up in the course of his Poor Law duties (he had succeeded his father as the Poor Law Union doctor for the Skibbereen district). There was an epidemic of violent measles on Cape Clear at the end of 1879 (typhus, apparently). The island was quarantined but Donovan went out and attended, fitting up a makeshift twenty-bed hospital on the island. He took the fever himself and succumbed. His death announcement (along with affectionate tributes) appeared in the pages of the Eagle on 6 March 1880.
