= Donovan Williams =

Donovan Williams may refer to:

- Donovan Williams (politician), Jamaican politician from the Labour Party
- Donovan Williams (basketball) (born 2001), an American professional basketball player
