= Edward Donavon =

Irish cricketer (1872–1951)

Personal information
- Full name: Edward James Conway Donavon
- Born: 31 May 1872; Dublin, Ireland
- Died: Q4 1951 (aged 79); Dublin, Ireland
- Batting: Right-handed
- Bowling: Right-arm medium

Domestic team information
- Years: Team
- 1907: Ireland

Career statistics
Competition	First-class
Matches	1
Runs scored	5
Batting average	5.00
100s/50s	–/–
Top score	3*
Balls bowled	60
Wickets	1
Bowling average	36.00
5 wickets in innings	–
10 wickets in match	–
Best bowling	1/36
Catches/stumpings	–/–
- Source: CricketEurope, 30 December 2021

Edward James Conway Donavon (31 May 1872 – 1951) was an Irish cricketer. He made his debut for the Ireland cricket team against South Africa in June 1904 and went on to play for them on four occasions, his last match coming against Yorkshire in May 1907.

Of his matches for Ireland, just once had first-class status, his last match against Yorkshire in May 1907. In all matches for Ireland, he scored 69 runs at an average of 34.50, with a top score of 38 against Cambridge University in July 1904. He took four wickets at an average of 29.75, with his best bowling figures of 2/17 also coming against Cambridge University.

His son Robert also represented Ireland at cricket.
