= Colin Platt =

Medievalist

Colin Platt FSA FRHistS
- Born: Colin Peter Sherard Platt; 11 November 1934
- Died: 23 July 2015 (aged 80)
- Title: Professor of History
- Awards: Wolfson History Prize (1991)

Academic background
- Education: Balliol College, Oxford; University of Leeds
- Thesis: The monastic grange: a survey of the historical and archaeological evidence (1966)

Academic work
- Discipline: Medieval studies
- Sub-discipline: England in the Middle Ages; medieval archaeology; medieval history
- Institutions: University of Leeds; University of Southampton
- Notable works: The Architecture of Medieval Britain: A Social History (1990)

Colin Peter Sherard Platt (11 November 1934 – 23 July 2015) was a British historian, archaeologist and academic, specialising in the Middle Ages. In 1991, he was awarded the Wolfson Prize. He taught at the University of Leeds and then at the University of Southampton, rising to become Professor of History.

== Early life and education ==
Platt was born on 11 November 1934 in Canton (now Guangdong), China. He was one of twin boys born to Jimmy Platt, a Shell executive, and his wife, Hope (née Arnold). His twin, Christopher (died 1989), went on to become Professor of the History of Latin America at the University of Oxford. He was educated at Collyer's School, then a grammar school in Horsham, West Sussex. He studied history at Balliol College, Oxford, graduating with a first class honours Bachelor of Arts (BA) degree in 1958. He then undertook his national service as a "Coder Special", a Royal Navy sailor specialising in cryptography, during which he leant Russian. He undertook a Doctor of Philosophy (PhD) degree at the University of Leeds, which he completed in 1966 with a doctoral thesis titled "The monastic grange: a survey of the historical and archaeological evidence".

== Academic career ==
In 1960, Platt became a research assistant at the University of Leeds, and, in addition, undertook his Doctor of Philosophy (PhD) degree. He became a lecturer in medieval archaeology from 1962. In 1964, he moved to the University of Southampton, joining its Department of History. He was then successively promoted from lecturer to senior lecturer to reader. He was awarded a personal chair in 1983 as Professor of History. Platt had a stammer which meant that his teaching was focused on small group tutorials, supervisions and field trips; his lectures, on the other hand, were read out by an actor with associated slides or played from a pre-recording. He retired from full-time academia in 1999 or 2001, and was appointed emeritus professor.

Platt's research interests in addition to medieval archaeology, ranged from ecclesiastical history to urban history to the architecture of castles and monastic granges. He drew on both archaeology and history in his research: he lamented "archaeologists' all too frequent failure to read, engage with and give due weight to historical evidence", and historians' focus on "academic theory over empirical research".

In 1991, Platt was awarded the Wolfson Prize for The Architecture of Medieval Britain: A Social History. He was also an elected Fellow of the Society of Antiquaries of London (FSA) and Fellow of the Royal Historical Society (FRHistS). A Festschrift was published in 2014, titled "A Fresh Approach: Essays Presented to Colin Platt in Celebration of His Eightieth Birthday 11 November 2014".

== Personal life ==
In 1963, Platt married to Valerie (née Ashforth). They had four children. After his first marriage ended in divorce, he married the art historian Claire Donovan in 1996.

== Selected works ==
- Platt, Colin (1969). The monastic grange in medieval England: a reassessment. New York, NY: Fordham University Press. ISBN 978-0823208456.
- Platt, Colin (1975). Excavations in medieval Southampton: 1953 - 1969. Leicester: Leicester University Press. ISBN 978-0718511234.
- Platt, Colin (1978). Medieval England: a social history and archaeology from the Conquest to A.D. 1600. London: Routledge & Kegan Paul. ISBN 978-0710088154.
- Platt, Colin (1986). The English medieval town. London: Secker & Warburg. ISBN 978-0436375514.
- Platt, Colin (1990). The architecture of medieval Britain: a social history. New Haven: Yale University Press. ISBN 9780300049534.
- Platt, Colin (1994). The great rebuildings of Tudor and Stuart England: revolutions in architectural taste. London: UCL Press. ISBN 9781857283167.
- Platt, Colin (1995). The parish churches of medieval England. London: Chancellor Press. ISBN 978-1851529032.
- Platt, Colin (2004). Marks of opulence: the why, when and where of Western art 1000 - 1900 AD. London: Harper Collins. ISBN 978-0002571005.
