= Donovans, Newfoundland and Labrador =

Village in Canada

Coordinates: 47°31′33″N 52°50′06″W

Donovans was a village located west of St. John's, Newfoundland and Labrador, eastern Canada. It had a population of 325 by 1956. It has been absorbed by the Town of Paradise where population density is 3,338 per square mile.

== See also ==
- List of communities in Newfoundland and Labrador
