= Cultural depictions of Charles Haughey =

The Irish politician and former Taoiseach Charles Haughey has been depicted in culture many times, across radio, television, novels, and theatre.

== Scrap Saturday ==
Haughey's image during his final years in office was influenced heavily by Dermot Morgan's depiction of him on the satirical radio programme Scrap Saturday (1989–1991). Dialogues with P. J. Mara, played by Owen Roe, portrayed Haughey as venal and vain; they were described by Patrick Maume as "an absurd and toothless ogre berating an obsequious P. J. Mara". Helena Sheehan wrote that the sketches "provided a picture of Charles Haughey which instinctively seemed far truer than that of his public persona". Scrap Saturday hinted at Haughey's affair with Terry Keane before it was public knowledge. Morgan later said that a friend of the Haughey family had contacted the programme asking them not to joke about Keane.

== Television ==
A three-part television drama, Charlie, covering Haughey's career between 1979 and 1992, was broadcast by RTÉ in 2015, with Aidan Gillen in the title role. Gillen's depiction of Haughey was praised for its accuracy, but the series was criticised for omitting the Arms Crisis.

== Novels ==
Haughey appears as a character in Ratlines, the 2012 thriller novel by Stuart Neville, which is set in 1960s Ireland. He is depicted as "an arrogant and preening Minister for Justice".

== Theatre ==
Hugh Leonard wrote a black comedy play, Kill (1982), whose central politician character is a thinly disguised version of Haughey. Sebastian Barry's Hinterland (2002) is about a retired Irish politician living in a Georgian mansion in north Dublin who shares numerous biographical details with Haughey. The play was criticised being for too personal, but Barry later said the protagonist was based on his own father. John Breen's play Charlie (2003) is explicitly about Haughey, and features flashbacks to the pivotal moments of his career. A 2018 play written by Colin Murphy, Haughey/Gregory, was produced by Fishamble: The New Play Company. It depicts the circumstances of Haughey's 1982 deal with independent TD Tony Gregory, and was later broadcast by RTÉ Radio.
