= Dermot Morgan =

Irish comedian and actor (1952–1998)

- Morgan in 1993
- Born: Dermot John Morgan; 31 March 1952; Dublin, Ireland
- Died: 28 February 1998 (aged 45); Richmond, London, England
- Resting place: Deans Grange Cemetery
- Occupations: Comedian; actor
- Years active: 1979–1998
- Spouse: Susanne Garmatz
- Partner: Fiona Clarke
- Children: 3

Dermot John Morgan (31 March 1952 – 28 February 1998) was an Irish comedian and actor, best known for his role as the title character on the Channel 4 sitcom Father Ted. Morgan died one day after filming of the third and final series of Father Ted was completed. In 1999 he was posthumously awarded the British Academy Television Award for Best Comedy Performance.

== Early life ==
Dermot John Morgan was born on 31 March 1952 in Dublin, the son of Donnchadh Morgan, a civil servant, gifted amateur artist and sculptor, and Hilda "Holly" (née Stokes). His father died young of an aneurysm, leaving Holly with three children: Dermot, Paul, and Denise. A fourth child, Ruth, died in childhood in 1956.

Morgan was educated at Oatlands College in Stillorgan and University College Dublin, where he studied English literature and philosophy. During his time there, he honed his comic skills; he also fronted a country and Irish band named Big Gom and the Imbeciles, a kind of "tribute" act to Big Tom and The Mainliners, a major Irish band of the era. According to Morgan in a January 1986 article, "Everybody slagged country and western at some stage".

Big Gom and the Imbeciles were never signed by a record label, and Morgan subsequently worked as a teacher, which, he admitted, was a type of performance in itself:

There is a comparison between the performance of a schoolteacher and performance in general. You're on your feet and you have to be able to think. The best way of maintaining discipline is to have the ready reply. That's what being a performer is like. If you have a rowdy crowd in a pub or cabaret somewhere you've got to be on top.

== Career ==
=== Father Trendy and The Live Mike ===
Morgan made his debut in the media on the Morning Ireland radio show produced by Gene Martin, whose sister Ella was the mother of one of Morgan's friends. It was through this contact that Morgan made the break into radio and eventually television.

According to a 1986 article in the Evening Herald, Morgan first got nationwide attention through letters he sent in to the Mike Murphy radio show:

"The letters were on anything, from sitting in the traffic to Moss Keane. Michael was quite biting in his humour at the time so my letters fitted in quite well with the show." And it was Mike Murphy who eventually gave him a regular spot on his TV series, The Live Mike. Dermot had been asked to do a routine on a TV pilot show hosted by Brendan Balfe. That was when he first introduced his ever-so laid back character, Father Trendy. "After all the letters to him, and after Murph saw the pilot show, he asked me to come on his own show..."

Morgan subsequently came to prominence as part of The Live Mike, which became hugely successful in Ireland. Between 1979 and 1982, Morgan played a range of comic characters who appeared between segments of the show. Morgan lampooned the rampant Modernism within the Post–Vatican II Roman Catholic Church in Ireland by incorporating his Father Trendy character, a wishy-washy, trying-to-be-cool hippie-priest (modelled after Father Brian D'Arcy). Father Trendy always wore an Elvis Presley-style haircut and sometimes a leather jacket. He was also given to drawing ludicrous parallels between religion and secularism in two-minute 'sermons' to the camera. Morgan also satirised extreme nationalist "Little Irelanders", by playing an irate and bigoted GAA member who waved his hurley around while verbally attacking his pet hates.

At the height of the Troubles, Morgan also lampooned both the Wolfe Tones and the clichés of Irish rebel songs, which he said "always have lots of blood and guts and fire and thunder in them". He then sang his own parody of Thomas Osborne Davis's iconic song "A Nation Once Again", about the martyrdom of Fido, a dog who saves his IRA master by eating a hand grenade during a search of the house by the Black and Tans during the Irish War of Independence. When Fido farts and the grenade accidentally detonates, the Black and Tans comment, "'Scuse me mate, was that something your dog ate?" The song climaxed with the words: "I hope that I shall live to see Fido an Alsatian once again."

=== As a singer: "Thank You Very Much, Mr. Eastwood" ===
Morgan released a comedy single, "Thank You Very Much, Mr. Eastwood", in December 1985 on Dolphin Records. It was a take on the fawning praise that internationally successful Irish boxer Barry McGuigan gave his manager, Barney Eastwood, at the end of successive bouts. The single 'featured' impressions of McGuigan, Ronald Reagan, Bob Geldof and Pope John Paul II, and was the Christmas number one in the Irish Singles Chart for 1985. Morgan spoke later to the press that he was "a bit worried" that his "take off" of the Pope during the song could have been received badly by the public, especially in Northern Ireland due to tensions there at the time.

Barry Devlin, the former Horslips lead singer produced the single, whilst Paul McGuinness, the U2 manager, "struck a deal" for its release in Britain, with Morgan clarifying "I don't think he particularly wants to get involved with comedians. I think he just liked the idea and looked after some of the business for me." Speaking with the Evening Herald in January 1986, Morgan announced that he would shortly be filming an accompanying music video for the single at Windmill Lane Film Studios in Dublin:

But the fun doesn't stop there. In fact, Thank You Very Much, Mr. Eastwood is just the first part of a new major offensive by Mr. Morgan on the Irish comedy scene... "I'm going to be doing an album next as the interest is now there and I have plenty of original material lying around. The video for the single is also part of a 20 minute pilot programme that myself and Windmill Lane studios are putting together. It's a full comedy production and we hope to interest RTÉ and Channel 4 with it." Dermot wants to get a comedy series off the ground made by an independent film company and he hopes to sell it both here and in Britain.

=== Scrap Saturday ===
Morgan's biggest Irish broadcasting success occurred in the late 1980s on the Saturday morning radio comedy show Scrap Saturday, in which Morgan, co-scriptwriter Gerard Stembridge, Owen Roe and Pauline McLynn mocked Ireland's political, business and media establishment. The show's treatment of the relationship between the ever-controversial Taoiseach Charles Haughey and his press secretary P. J. Mara proved particularly popular, with Haughey's dismissive attitude towards Mara and the latter's adoring and grovelling attitude towards his boss winning critical praise.

Morgan pilloried Haughey's propensity for claiming a family connection to almost every part of Ireland he visited by referring to a famous advertisement for Harp Lager, which played on the image of someone returning home and seeking friends.

The Haughey/Mara "double act" became the star turn in a series that mocked both sides of the political divide, from Haughey and his advisors to opposition Fine Gael TD Michael Noonan as Limerick disk jockey "Morning Noon'an Night". When RTÉ axed the show in the early 1990s a national outcry ensued. Morgan lashed the decision, calling it "a shameless act of broadcasting cowardice and political subservience". An RTÉ spokesman said: "The show is not being axed. It's just not being continued!"

In 1991, Morgan received a Jacob's Award for his contribution to Scrap Saturday from the Irish national newspaper radio critics.

=== Father Ted ===
Already a celebrity in Ireland, Morgan got his big break in Britain with Channel 4's Irish sitcom Father Ted, which ran for three series from 1995 to 1998. Writers Graham Linehan and Arthur Mathews auditioned many actors for the title role, but Morgan's enthusiasm won him the part. Father Ted focuses on the misadventures of three morally dubious Irish Catholic priests, whose transgressions have caused them to be exiled to the fictional Craggy Island, off the west coast of Ireland.

==== BAFTA Award ====
In 1996, Father Ted won a BAFTA award for Best Comedy Series. The same year Morgan also won a British Comedy Award for Top TV Comedy Actor, and McLynn was awarded Top TV Comedy Actress. In 1999, Father Ted won a second BAFTA for Best Comedy, with Morgan being awarded Best Comedy Performance posthumously.

=== Unreleased works ===
Morgan said in an interview with Gay Byrne on The Late Late Show in 1996 that he was writing a screenplay titled Miracle of the Magyars, based on a real-life incident in the 1950s when the Archbishop of Dublin John Charles McQuaid forbade Catholics from attending a football match between the Republic of Ireland and Yugoslavia on religious and spiritual grounds. Yugoslavia won the match 4–1. Morgan planned to use Hungary as the opposing side to the Republic of Ireland – hence the title. At the time of his death in 1998, he had completed the screenplay but the film was never made.

Morgan's first project after Father Ted was to be Re-united, a sitcom about two retired footballers sharing a flat in London. According to former manager John Fisher, Morgan was writing the script for the programme and planned to take the part of "an Eamon Dunphy-type who had gone on to work in journalism, but had ended up living with an old football pal". Mel Smith was in talks for the role of the friend.

Morgan had been commissioned to write a drama series for the BBC.

== Personal life ==
Morgan was married to Susanne Garmatz, a German woman, with whom he had two sons. He later began a relationship with Fiona Clarke, with whom he had another son.

Although he had been raised as a Catholic and had briefly considered becoming a priest during childhood, Morgan became an atheist in his later life, and he was critical of the Catholic Church.

He supported Irish football clubs Shamrock Rovers F.C. and UCD, as well as English football club Chelsea.

== Death ==
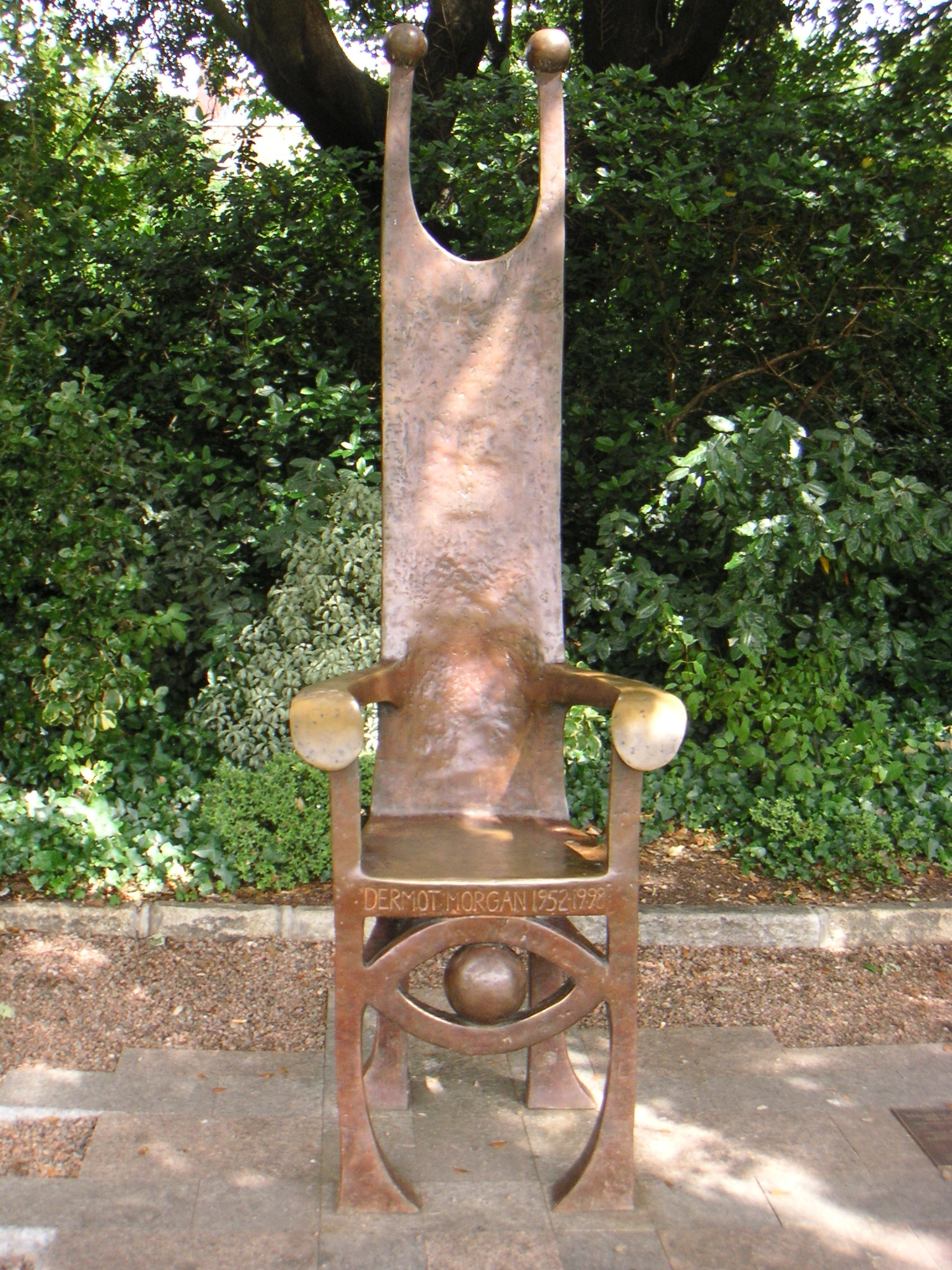
The "Joker's Chair", a memorial to Morgan in Merrion Square, Dublin

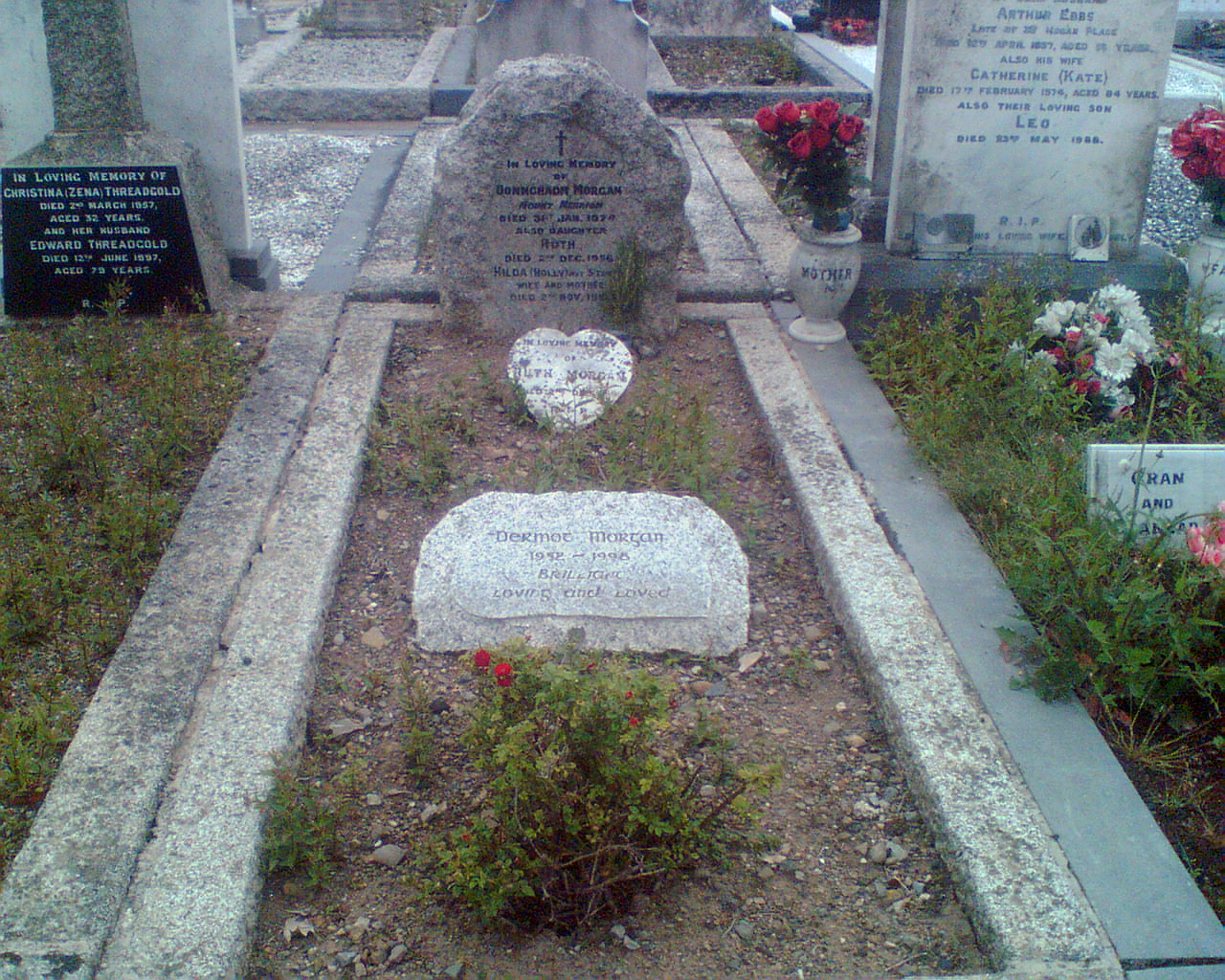
Morgan's grave in Dean's Grange Cemetery, south County Dublin

Before location filming on the third and final series of Father Ted, Morgan underwent a mandatory medical examination in which he was found to have hypertension, and was prescribed medication. On 28 February 1998, one day after recording the series' final episode, Morgan suffered a heart attack while hosting a dinner party at his home in London's St Margarets area, at which the Scottish musician Jim Diamond was present. Guests and paramedics tried to revive him at his home. He was rushed to West Middlesex University Hospital in Isleworth, but despite further resuscitation efforts, he died. He was 45 years old.

Morgan's sister Denise said, "He wasn't feeling great at the end of the meal and I went to the bedroom with him. He had a heart attack, and I didn't recognise it. From my limited training in first aid, I wasn't sure exactly what was happening. The symptoms didn't match what the books said. I said to him 'I think you are okay' and we went back to the table. He apologised for having left the room and the next thing he just collapsed. We tried to resuscitate him but it didn't work." Father Ted co-star Frank Kelly said, "Dermot's mind was mercurial. I think he was a kind of comedic meteor. He burned himself out."

Despite Morgan's atheism, a Catholic requiem mass was offered for him at St Therese's Church in the South Dublin suburb of Mount Merrion. The mass was attended by Irish President Mary McAleese, her predecessor Mary Robinson, and many of the Irish political and religious leaders who had been the targets of his satire in Scrap Saturday. His body was cremated at Glasnevin Cemetery, and his ashes were buried in the family plot at Dean's Grange Cemetery.

== Legacy ==
"The Joker's Chair", a bronze throne by sculptor Catherine Green, was unveiled by then-Taoiseach Bertie Ahern in Merrion Square, Dublin. It bears his name, date of birth, and date of death.

In December 2013, the documentary Dermot Morgan – Fearless Funnyman aired on RTÉ One.

A plaque outside McGuire's shop in Mount Merrion was unveiled in 2016.

A wax statue of Morgan stands in the national wax museum in Dublin as part of a "Father Ted's Room" display.

== Appearances ==
=== Television ===
- The Live Mike (1979–1982)
- Father Ted (1995–1998)
- Have I Got News for You (1996–97; episodes 11.02 and 14.03)
- Shooting Stars (1 episode, 1996)
- That's Showbusiness (1 episode, 1996)

=== Radio ===
- Scrap Saturday (1989–1991)

=== Film ===
- Taffin (1988)
- The First Snow of Winter (1998, voice in UK version)
