= Reefer and the Model =

1988 film by Joe Comerford

- Directed by: Joe Comerford
- Written by: Joe Comerford
- Produced by: Lelia Doolan
- Starring: Ian McElhinney; Carol Scanlan; Sean Lawlor
- Cinematography: Breffni Byrne
- Edited by: Sé Merry Doyle
- Music by: Andy Roberts, Johnny Duhan
- Production companies: Berber Films; Film Four International; Raidió Teilifís Éireann; Bord Scannán na hÉireann; Metro Pictures
- Distributed by: Metro Pictures
- Release date: 1988
- Running time: 93 minutes
- Country: Ireland
- Language: English
- Budget: £1.05 million

Reefer and the Model is a 1988 Irish film written and directed by Joe Comerford. It concerns Reefer, a former Irish Republican Army man who operates a ferry using an old trawler between the Galway coast and the Aran Islands; his friends Spider and Badger; and the pregnant Teresa ("the Model"), who has abandoned a life of drugs and prostitution in England. The group become involved in the armed robbery of a post office and are pursued by the Gardaí. The film premièred in Galway in August 1988.

== Awards ==
Reefer and the Model won the Europa Prize at the Barcelona Festival, and Best Feature at the Celtic Film Festival in Wales. At the 1988 European Film Awards, the film was nominated for Best Young Film, Carol Scanlan was nominated for Best Actress, and Ray McBride was nominated for Best Supporting Actor.

== Cast ==
- Ian McElhinney – Reefer
- Carol Scanlan – Teresa 'the Model'
- Sean Lawlor – Spider
- Ray McBride – Badger
- Eve Watkinson – The Mother
- Birdy Sweeney – Instant Photo
- Fionn Comerford – Messenger Boy
- John Lillis – Porter
- Henry Comerford – Waiter
- Paraic Breathnach – Quayside Fisherman
- Maire Chinsealach – Island Woman
- Dave Duffy – Sergeant
- Rosina Brown – The Blonde
- Little John Nee – Boy Soldier
- Seán Ó Coisdealbha – Rossaveal Skipper
- Noel Spain – Boatman
- Peter Fitzgerald – Bank Guard
- Dick Donaghue – Bank Teller
- Máire Ní Mháille – Bank Teller
- Michael Rowland – Older Bank Guard (as Mick Rowland)
- Patrick Blackaby – 1st Tinker Guard
- Uinseann Mac Thomáis – 2nd Tinker Guard
- Deirdre Lawless – Policewoman
- Gary McMahon – Young Guard
