= The Little Unicorn =

- DVD Cover
- Directed by: Paul Matthews
- Written by: Paul Matthews
- Produced by: Elizabeth Matthews; Paul Matthews
- Starring: Brittney Bomann; Byron Taylor; Emma Samms; David Warner; Mick Walter
- Cinematography: Vincent G. Cox
- Edited by: Peter H. Matthews
- Music by: Mark Thomas
- Production company: Peakviewing Transatlantic PLC
- Distributed by: Aquarius TV; Edel Media & Entertainment; Moviemax Family; SBP; Top Tape
- Release date: 2001; (USA)
- Running time: 92 minutes
- Country: South Africa
- Language: English
- Budget: $6 million

The Little Unicorn is a 2001 South African direct-to-video fantasy adventure film written, co-produced and directed by Paul Matthews.

== Plot ==
Polly Regan and her grandfather have to rescue a little unicorn when it's captured by a circus' owners.

== Cast ==
- Brittney Bomann as Polly Regan
- Byron Taylor as Toby Cooper
- Emma Samms as Lucy Regan
- David Warner as Ted Regan
- Mick Walter as Mighty
- Joe Penny as Tiny
- George Hamilton as The Great Allonso
- Christopher Atkins as PC Sid Edwards

== Reception ==
Vince Leo from Qwipster's Movie Reviews gave the film one and a half out of five stars. He was critical about the movie and failed to find any good aspect in its production. He stated: "Unless you are a young child who is obsessed with unicorns, there is just nothing here at all to recommend. The Little Unicorn is as derivative as they come, with an undercurrent of ugliness that seems out-of-place in what should be a heartwarming tale. It's dreadfully boring and noisy, and about the longest 80 minutes you could spend doing just about anything. Writer-director Paul Matthews followed this up with another similar film, The Last Leprechaun, with much of the same cast. I'll probably never review it, since I've already dubbed Unicorn with the alternate title, 'THE LAST PAUL MATTHEWS FILM I'LL EVER SEE.'"

In 2017, RiffTrax released a downloadable version of The Little Unicorn with a comedic commentary track.
