= Berserker (2004 film) =

2004 fantasy-action-horror film

- Directed by: Paul Matthews
- Written by: Paul Matthews
- Produced by: Paul Matthews
- Starring: Paul Johansson; Craig Sheffer; Kari Wührer; Patrick Bergin
- Narrated by: Paul Johansson
- Cinematography: Vincent G. Cox
- Edited by: Peter Davies
- Music by: Mark Thomas
- Release date: 11 May 2004
- Running time: 83 minutes
- Country: South Africa
- Language: English

Berserker, also known as Berserker: Hell's Warrior, is a fantasy-action-horror film based on Norse mythology. It was written, directed and produced by Paul Matthews and had its main release in 2004.

== Plot ==
The film begins with a voice-over by Barek who refers to a Norse legend. According to the saga, Odin was spurned by Brunhild. The irate Norse god chained her to an altar in Asgard, surrounded by a ring of eternal fire. He decreed that only a pure-hearted man could overcome the supernatural flames and save the alluring Valkyrie. Her saviour's fate should then be connected to hers forever. As Barek explains, he and his only brother learned about this as little boys and craved more and more to rescue the legendary beauty as they grew older.

As it is later on successively revealed by flashbacks, Boar eventually could not resist anymore and entered the ring of fire. Hereby he suffered severe burns. Barek followed him into the fire and remained wondrously unharmed. He unchained the Valkyrie and persuaded her to save Boar's life. Unfortunately her bite turned Boar into a cannibalistic Berserker.

When their father, Viking leader Thorsson is in need of reinforcements because he is in war with the Army of the Nord, he joins an alliance with the Berserkers who are now led by Boar. Following their combined campaign, they fight each other. Thorsson uses fire against the otherwise immortal Berserker Boar. Barek cannot bear see his brother burning and calls Odin for help. Odin complies with Barek's request but from now the fates of Barek, Boar, and Brunhilda are interlinked by a timeless curse.

== Cast ==
- Paul Johansson as Barek
- Craig Sheffer as Boar
- Kari Wuhrer as Brunhilda / Anya
- Patrick Bergin as Thorsson

== Reception ==
The film was called "over-ambitious" and even a "train wreck". The sounds of the valkyries reminded another critic of the "hissing" of his cat "when she sees another cat". In February 2018, the film was released with Rifftrax commentary.
