= Murder in Eden =

Murder in Eden may refer to:

- Murder in Eden (TV Series), a 1991 British television miniseries
- Murder in Eden (film), a 1961 British film
