= Breeders (1997 film) =

- Directed by: Paul Matthews
- Written by: Paul Matthews
- Produced by: Elizabeth Matthews
- Starring: Todd Jensen; Samantha Womack; Oliver Tobias
- Cinematography: Peter Thornton
- Edited by: Peter H. Matthews
- Music by: Ian Lawson
- Production company: Isle of Man Film
- Distributed by: A-Pix Entertainment, Inc.
- Release date: October 21, 1997
- Running time: 92 minutes
- Country: United Kingdom
- Language: English
- Budget: $3 million

Breeders (also known as Deadly Instincts) is a 1997 science fiction erotic horror film directed by Paul Matthews, a remake of the 1986 film of the same name and stars Todd Jensen, Samantha Womack, and Oliver Tobias.

== Plot ==
After a meteorite crashes in Boston, an alien hides in the grounds and tunnels of a nearby all-girls college. Ashley Rowe, an art teacher, learns of the monster and soon discovers the monster is stalking the students, looking for a mate.

== Cast ==
- Todd Jensen as Ashley
- Samantha Womack as Louise
- Oliver Tobias as Moore
- Kadamba Simmons as Space Girl

== Production ==
Breeders was filmed on the Isle of Man between January and February of 1997. Initially the film was announced under the working title of Grim 2 as Paul Matthews's Grim had been a sizable success abroad. The title Rampage was also considered before eventually settling on Breeders.

== Release ==
Breeders was released direct-to-video on October 21, 1997.
