= Paul Matthews (filmmaker) =

- Born: 1957 (age 68–69)
- Occupations: Film producer, writer, director

Paul Matthews (born 1957) is a British film producer, writer, and director.

== Career ==
Prior to getting involved in film, Matthews worked for 12 years as a concrete molder while using his off hours to build connections with people in film production as well as writing scripts. Matthews' first foray into film making came about when he wrote the script The Christmas Stallion and with the help of his older sister and former solicitor, Liz, managed to attract the interest of Welsh language free-to-air public broadcast television channel S4C to produce the film for £1 million shooting it in both Welsh and English. The Christmas Stallion would end up being the first project Matthews' production company Peakviewing Transatlantic which he founded with the help of his retired father and siblings.

In February 2012, it was announced Opus Distribution had acquired the distribution rights to Peakviewing's library including Matthews' films.

== Filmography ==
=== Writer ===
- The Christmas Stallion (1992)
- Trigger Fast (1994)
- Guns of Honor (1994)
- Grim (1996)
- The Proposition (1996)
- Breeders (1997)
- Beings (1998)
- The Last Leprechaun (1998)
- Africa (1999)
- Merlin: The Return (2000)
- The Little Unicorn (2001)
- The Meeksville Ghost (2001)
- Hooded Angels (2002)
- Berserker: Hell's Warrior(2004)
- The Magic Door (2007)

=== Director ===
- Grim (1996)
- The Proposition (1996)
- Breeders (1997)
- Beings (1998)
- The Last Leprechaun (1998)
- Africa (1999)
- Merlin: The Return (2000)
- The Little Unicorn (2001)
- The Meeksville Ghost (2001)
- Hooded Angels (2002)
- Berserker: Hell's Warrior (2004)
- The Magic Door (2007)

=== Producer ===
- Filligoggin (1999) (TV series)
