= Glory Glory (film) =

2000 film

- Directed by: Paul Matthews
- Written by: Paul Matthews
- Produced by: Elizabeth Matthews, Paul Matthews
- Starring: Chantell Stander; Paul Johansson; Amanda Donohoe; Steven Bauer
- Cinematography: Vincent G. Cox
- Edited by: Peter Davies
- Music by: Mark Thomas
- Release date: 2000
- Country: South Africa
- Language: English

Glory Glory is a 2000 western film. The film was also marketed under the title Hooded Angels.

== Synopsis ==
It is the dawn of the Wild West in Silver Creek. A gang of beautiful but deadly women have unleashed violence on the society that failed to protect them, robbing banks and destroying everything in their path. A posse is sent after these masked raiders, not knowing whom they are chasing nor the fate that will await them – for bringing these female vigilantes to justice will unleash a surprising past and a new future for all.

== Cast ==
- Amanda Donohoe
- Steven Bauer as Jack
- Paul Johansson as Wes
- Gary Busey as Sheriff
- Chantell Stander as Hannah
- Juliana Venter as Ellie
- David Dukas as Billy
- Gideon Emery as Sil
- Jenna Dover as Jane
- Julie Hartley as April
- Candice Argall as Becky
- Jennifer Steyn as Christa
- Ana Alexander as Marie (Credited as Anna Katerina)
- Michelle Bradshaw as Sherrie
