= Merlin: The Return =

- Directed by: Paul Matthews
- Written by: Paul Matthews
- Based on: Arthurian legend
- Produced by: Elizabeth Matthews; Paul Matthews
- Starring: Rik Mayall; Patrick Bergin; Craig Sheffer; Adrian Paul; Tia Carrere
- Cinematography: Vincent G. Cox
- Edited by: Peter Davies
- Music by: Mark Thomas
- Production company: Allumination
- Distributed by: Peakviewing Transatlantic Plc
- Release date: 22 December 2000
- Running time: 90 minutes
- Country: United Kingdom
- Language: English
- Box office: £20,868 (UK)

Merlin: The Return is a 2000 British fantasy film written, produced, and directed by Paul Matthews. The film stars Rik Mayall, Patrick Bergin, Craig Sheffer, Adrian Paul, Julie Hartley, and Tia Carrere. It tells the story of Merlin and King Arthur in the modern era.

== Plot ==
For 1,500 years, the powers of Merlin (Rik Mayall) have kept the evil Mordred (Craig Sheffer) and his mother Morgana (Grethe Fox) captive in another world. When a present-day scientist (Tia Carrere) stumbles upon the gateway between this world and the one Mordred is imprisoned in, it is up to a recently re-awakened King Arthur (Patrick Bergin), Merlin and Lancelot (Adrian Paul) to stop Mordred from returning.

== Cast ==
- Rik Mayall as Merlin
- Patrick Bergin as King Arthur
- Craig Sheffer as Mordred
- Adrian Paul as Lancelot
- Julie Hartley as Guinevere
- Tia Carrere as Dr. Joan Maxwell
- Leigh Greyvenstein as Kate
- Byron Taylor as Richie Gould
- Grethe Fox as Morgana
- Jennifer Steyn as Richie's Mom
- Anthony Bishop as Gawain
- Lynne White as Aunt Everlyn
- Jocelyn Broderick as Megan

== Reception ==
Critical reception for the film was mostly negative. Several critics such as Michael Thomson of the BBC, Time Out, and Total Film have criticized the film for its direction and screenplay.
