= Ray McBride =

Irish actor (1952–2021)

- Born: 1953; Bohermore, Galway, Ireland
- Died: 27 July 2021 (aged 69); Claddagh, Galway, Ireland

Ray McBride (1952 – 27 July 2021) was an Irish dancer and stage, film and television actor.

== Career ==
Born in Bohermore, Galway, McBride was educated at Claddagh National School and St Mary's College. He trained as an Irish dancer and won several All-Ireland medals at various feiseanna. During his secondary schooling, McBride developed an interest in athletics and was awarded a scholarship to East Tennessee State University. He won a gold medal in the 3,000 metres steeplechase in the Catholic Student Games in Madrid, and later won gold medals in the 800 metres and the 1,500 metres in the Tailteann Games in Dublin. While in Tennessee, McBride studied speech and drama and became interested in acting. His first major part was leading in a production of The Playboy of the Western World in the Barton Theatre. McBride returned to Galway in 1978 and joined the new Druid Theatre Company. Over the course of the following 20 years, he enjoyed an extensive career in theatre, film, and television.

== Illness and death ==
McBride's career was severely curtailed when he was diagnosed with a cancer that affected his speech and balance in 1999. He died on 27 July 2021.

== Partial filmography ==
- Reefer and the Model (1988) – Badger
- Into the West (1992) – Mr Murphy
- Guiltrip (1995) – Security Man
- Ballykissangel (1998, TV series) – Tom
- Pete's Meteor (1998) – Mr Keane
- Love and Rage (1998) – 3 Card Trickster
- Angela's Ashes (1999) – Mill Foreman
