= Alice Owens =

Alice Owens may refer to:

- Dame Alice Owen's School
- Alice Owens, character in About Adam
