= Gerard Stembridge =

Irish writer, director and actor (born 1958)

Gerry Stembridge
- Born: 1958 (age 67–68); County Limerick, Ireland
- Occupations: Writer; director; novelist
- Writing career
- Notable works: Scrap Saturday (1989–91); Ordinary Decent Criminal (2000); Nora (2000); Counting Down (2009)

Gerard "Gerry" Stembridge (born 1958) is an Irish writer, director and actor. He was educated at CBS Sexton Street in Limerick and later at Castleknock College. While attending University College Dublin, he was auditor of the Literary and Historical Society. He taught English, history and drama at Mount Temple Comprehensive School in Clontarf.

== Radio ==
He reached significant prominence in Ireland when he co-created the satirical comedy radio programme Scrap Saturday with Dermot Morgan. It became one of the most popular programmes on RTÉ Radio.

== Film career ==
Stembridge wrote the screenplay for Ordinary Decent Criminal (which starred Kevin Spacey and Linda Fiorentino). He co-wrote Nora, a film about James Joyce and Nora Barnacle which starred Ewan McGregor and Susan Lynch. He has directed such films as Guiltrip, Black Day at Black Rock, Alarm and About Adam.

== Playwright ==
A selection of his plays include

- 1992
- Betrayals
- Ceaucescu's Ear (Teatru Míc in Bucharest)
- Daniel's Hands (City Arts Centre, Dublin)
- Denis and Rose (Civic Theatre, Dublin)
- The Gay Detective (Project Arts Centre, Dublin)
- Love Child
- Melting Penguins
- That Was Then (Abbey Theatre, Dublin).
- The Leaving

== Novels ==
Stembridge's latest novel The Effect of Her was published in 2013. He is also the author of three earlier novels: Unspoken (Old Street Press), Counting Down and According to Luke (both Penguin Ireland).

== See also ==
- Auditors of the Literary and Historical Society (University College Dublin)
