= The Courier (1988 film) =

- U.S theatrical release poster
- Directed by: Frank Deasy; Joe Lee
- Written by: Frank Deasy
- Produced by: Hilary Estey McLoughlin
- Starring: Padraig O'Loinsigh; Cait O'Riordan; Ian Bannen; Patrick Bergin; Andrew Connolly; Gabriel Byrne
- Cinematography: Gabriel Beristain
- Edited by: Annette D'Alton
- Music by: Declan MacManus (Elvis Costello)
- Production company: Palace Pictures
- Distributed by: Vestron Pictures
- Release date: 14 December 1988 (United States limited)
- Running time: 82 minutes
- Countries: United Kingdom; Ireland
- Language: English

The Courier is a 1988 action crime thriller film directed by Frank Deasy and Joe Lee and starring Padraig O'Loinsigh, Cait O'Riordan, Ian Bannen, Patrick Bergin, Andrew Connolly and Gabriel Byrne.

== Cast ==
- Padraig O'Loinsigh as Mark
- Cait O'Riordan as Colette
- Gabriel Byrne as Val
- Ian Bannen as McGuigan
- Patrick Bergin as Christy
- Andrew Connolly as Danny
- Michelle Houlden as Sharon
- Joe Savino as Video Editor
