= The Live Mike =

Irish variety show

- Still from The Lives of Mike, a 2008 documentary about The Live Mike.
- Genre: Comedy, entertainment, satire
- Written by: Brendan Martin, James Morrissey, Paddy Murray, Dermot Morgan, Éanna Brophy, Derek Davis, Frank Sheerin, Jim Lockhart, Barry Devlin, Eoghan Harris, John Lynch, Arthur Flynn
- Directed by: John Lynch, Paul Cusack, Joe McCormack, Briain McLaughlin, John Keogh
- Presented by: Mike Murphy
- Starring: Adele King; Dermot Morgan; Fran Dempsey; Mary Ryan; Honor Heffernan
- Country of origin: Ireland
- Original language: English
- No. of series: 3

Production
- Producers: John Lynch, John Keogh
- Production locations: Studio 1, RTÉ Television Centre, Donnybrook, Dublin 4, Ireland
- Camera setup: Multi-camera
- Running time: 40–70 minutes
- Production company: RTÉ

Original release
- Network: RTÉ 1
- Release: 9 November 1979 – 2 April 1982

The Live Mike is an Irish television comedy, variety, and chat show presented by Mike Murphy. It was first broadcast on RTÉ 1 on 9 November 1979. The programme featured a candid camera pieces by Murphy himself, with parody songs and comedy sketches by Twink, Dermot Morgan and Fran Dempsey, as well as a serious studio interview. The show ended on 2 April 1982.

== The show ==
=== Format ===
The Live Mike was created to fill the vacant Friday night slot on the newly created channel, RTÉ 2, in November 1979. Presented by Mike Murphy, the show usually consisted of a serious discussion, comedy contributions by Dermot Morgan, and a candid camera segment of unsuspecting members of the public, including a famous prank played on broadcaster Gay Byrne. The candid camera scenes invariably ended with the host saying "I'm Mike Murphy from RTÉ", which virtually became a catchphrase.

=== Final show ===
The programme ran for three series and ended in 1982. On the last show, Murphy caused consternation when he told viewers that the show would not be returning. This was Murphy's decision and had not been discussed with any of the senior management at the station. Many thought that this incident would result in the death of Murphy's career. However, he remained with the station for the next twenty years. Murphy said in an interview in 2006 that he had decided to end the show when, after the second season ended in 1981, a number of crew members had left, and that the show was no longer as fun to make as it had previously been.

== Documentary ==
A two-part documentary series, The Lives of Mike, was broadcast in 2008. The series focused on Murphy's part in the original show.
