= Scrap Saturday =

Satirical Irish radio sketch show (1989–1991)

- Genre: comedy sketch show, political satire
- Running time: 29 minutes
- Country of origin: Republic of Ireland
- Language: English
- Home station: RTÉ Radio 1
- TV adaptations: spiritual successor to Hall's Pictorial Weekly
- Starring: Dermot Morgan; Pauline McLynn; Owen Roe
- Created by: Dermot Morgan; Gerry Stembridge
- Recording studio: RTÉ Radio Centre, Dublin
- Original release: 1989 – December 1991
- No. of series: 3

Scrap Saturday was an Irish satirical radio sketch show created by Dermot Morgan, who was also the main performer on the show, and Gerry Stembridge, which ran on RTÉ Radio 1 on Saturday mornings from 1989 until 1991. Pauline McLynn and Owen Roe participated as performers.

== Show ==
The half-hour show lampooned political and cultural figures in Irish society such as Charles Haughey and Pádraig Flynn. At the centre of the show was the relationship between the then Taoiseach Charles Haughey and his political advisor P. J. Mara. A number of Irish cultural figures came in for a lampooning on a regular basis such as broadcasters Mike Murphy when a presenter of RTÉ Radio 1's "Arts Show", Gay Byrne and Bibi Baskin. Amongst politicians of the time, versions of Gerry Collins and Michael Noonan featured regularly, as did then president Mary Robinson. Others regularly lampooned include journalist and commentator Eamon Dunphy.

The show was very popular with listeners and there were accusations of political interference when it was dropped by RTÉ.

A 4-CD set of selected extracts from the show was released by RTÉ in 2007, the first two CDs covering general extracts, and the second two CDs covering Charles Haughey ("CJ") and P. J. Mara, the two main targets of the show.
