= Andrew Connolly =

Irish actor (born 1965)

- Born: 30 November 1965 (age 60); Dublin, Ireland
- Education: Trinity College Dublin
- Occupations: Actor, director
- Years active: 1985–present
- Spouse: Karen Woodley
- Children: Seraphina Connolly, Cassandra Woodley-Connolly

Andrew Connolly (born 30 November 1965) is an Irish stage and screen actor and director.

== Biography ==
Connolly was born in Dublin, Ireland, on 30 November 1965 and was raised in the Finglas and Ringsend areas.

At sixteen years old he left school for a seven-month stint in the Merchant Navy, and later served eighteen months of "torture" in the Irish Navy before returning to Dublin, where he became involved in the Dublin Youth Theater. Connolly began his screen career with a recurring role in the RTÉ television series Inside in 1985, with his first film role coming three years later opposite Gabriel Byrne in The Courier. Connolly received roles in several high-profile projects in the 1990s, including the film adaptation of the Tom Clancy novel Patriot Games in 1993, and he received a Best Actor nomination for his portrayal of an abusive soldier in 1995's Guiltrip.

In 1997, Connolly, his wife (actress Karen Woodley), and their two children relocated to Los Angeles. He had roles in several acclaimed television series, including Lost, Heroes, and The Closer. He wrote and directed the short film Flush in 2003, and made his feature film directoral debut with 2008's Quest for the Meaning of Life .

Connolly's most recognizable role was in the video game genre as captain James Donnelly, in L.A. Noire. His latest role was as an ex-con Paddy Bishop in the opera Fair City.

== Filmography ==
Year	Title	Role	Notes
1985–1986	Inside	Prisoner	Twelve episodes
1986	Boom Babies		Short
1987	Frankie and Johnnie		Short
1988	The Courier	Danny	
1988	Joyriders	Perky Rice	
1988	Goodbye Piccadilly	Matt	Short
1990	The Truth About Claire	Colman	
1990	Saints and Scholars	Jamie	Short
1990	All My Lovely Boys		Short
1991–1994	The Bill	Steven Moss/Sean Tovey	Two episodes
1992	Patriot Games	Charlie Dugan	
1993	Lovejoy	Publican	One episode
1993	Circle of Deceit	Dermot McAuley	
1994	Family	Liam	One episode
1995	Mad Dogs and Englishmen	Clive Nathan	
1995	Guiltrip	Liam	Nominated Best Actor, Amiens Film Festival
1995	Runway One		
1996–1997	Bramwell	Dr. Finn O'Neill	Eight episodes
1999	Shergar	Colcannon	
1999	Vendetta	Sheriff Bill Villere	
1999	Vicious Circle	Detective Declan Finney	
2000	Taggart	DI Ronnie Greig	One episode
2001	Rebel Heart	Eamon DeValera	One episode
2002	The Secret Sea	Karl	Short
2002	Full Frontal	Partygoer	
2003	Murder, She Wrote: The Celtic Riddle	Tom Molloy	
2003	Flush	Writer/Director/Co-producer	Short
2007	Lost	Brother Campbell	Episode: "Catch-22"
2007	On Broadway	Uncle Pete	
2007	ER	Brit No. 1	One episode
2008	Quest for the Meaning of Life	Director/The Dog	
2009	Heroes	Joseph Sullivan	Two episodes
2010	Chuck	Jack Artman	One episode
2010	NCIS: Los Angeles	Jacobus Troyger	One episode
2010	The Closer	Shariq Marku	Two episodes
2011	The Cape	Scales' Trainer	
2011	Water for Elephants	Weehawken Officer	
2011	L.A. Noire	Capt. James Donnelly	Video game; voice and face modelling
2013	Fair City	Paddy Bishop	Recurring
2015	Full Circle	Al Riordan	Two episodes
2016	You're The Worst	Freddie	One episode
