= Tony Doyle (actor) =

Irish actor (1935–2000)

- Born: 21 July 1935; Ballyfarnan, County Roscommon, Ireland
- Died: 28 January 2000 (aged 64); St Thomas's Hospital, in Lambeth, London, England
- Occupation: Actor
- Spouse: Sally Doyle
- Children: 6

Michael Anthony Doyle (21 July 1935 – 28 January 2000) was an Irish television and film actor. He became widely known in Ireland as a then-radical priest in the popular Irish rural drama The Riordans, which began in 1965. He worked consistently in series, television films, and feature films throughout his life. He died unexpectedly in 2000, at the time playing in another well-known Irish rural drama, Ballykissangel.

== Acting career ==
He first came to prominence playing a liberal Catholic priest, Father Sheehy, in RTÉ's rural drama The Riordans. He appeared in such popular shows as Travelling Man (Granada TV series, 1984-5), Coronation Street, Between the Lines, 1990, Children of the North, Ballykissangel and Four Fathers, and won an Irish Film and Television Academy Award for best leading performance for his role in the 1998 miniseries Amongst Women. Tony Doyle also appeared in the first Minder episode, "Gunfight at the OK Laundrette", playing a drunken Irishman.

His most famous film role saw Tony as the head of the SAS, Colonel Hadley, in the 1982 British film Who Dares Wins. His other film roles included appearances in Ulysses (1967), Quackser Fortune Has a Cousin in the Bronx (1970), Loophole (1981), Eat the Peach (1986), Secret Friends (1991), Damage (1992), Circle of Friends (1995) and as Tom French in I Went Down (1997).

He played George Ferguson in ten episodes of Kay Mellor's Band of Gold TV drama from 1995 to 1996.

He was married to Sally and was the father of six children, including the actress Susannah Doyle.

== Death and legacy ==
He died at St Thomas's Hospital in Lambeth, London, England.

Brian Quigley, Doyle's Ballykissangel character, was written out of the show in the first episode of the final series, where Quigley fakes his own suicide by drowning before fleeing to Brazil.

The Tony Doyle Bursary for New Writing was launched by the BBC following his death. Judges include his friend and Ballykissangel co-star Lorcan Cranitch. Cranitch subsequently starred in the BBC detective series McCready and Daughter, which had been written with Doyle in mind.

== Filmography ==
Year	Title	Role	Notes
1967	Ulysses	Lt. Gardner	
1970	Quackser Fortune Has a Cousin in the Bronx	Mike	
1977	1990	David Brett	
1981	Loophole	Nolan	
1982	Who Dares Wins	Colonel Hadley	
1986	Eat the Peach	Sean Murtagh	
1987	Devil's Paradise	Quinn	
1991	Secret Friends	Martin	
1991	Adventures in Dinosaur City	Rex	
1991	Murder in Eden	Tim Roarty	BBC Miniseries
1992	Damage	Prime Minister	
1995	Circle of Friends	Dr. Foley	
1997	I Went Down	Tom French	
1998	Amongst Women	"Daddy" Michael Moran	RTE Miniseries
1999	The Boxer		Uncredited
1999	A Love Divided	Father Stafford	
