= Peter Hanly =

Irish actor (born 1964)

- Born: 1964 (age 61–62); Dublin, Ireland
- Occupation: Actor
- Spouse: Jennifer O'Dea (m. 2000)
- Children: 2

Peter Hanly (born 1964) is an Irish actor best known for his performances in Braveheart as Edward, Prince of Wales, and as Garda Ambrose Egan in the BBC TV series Ballykissangel.

Hanly's repertoire encompasses plays, television performances, as well as movies.

== Personal life ==
Hanly attended Dublin Youth Theatre as a young teen where he started his acting career. He continues to work as an actor in Dublin, where he lives with his wife Jennifer O'Dea and their two children.

He wrote and acted in his play “What are you afraid of?” In Kilkenny Arts Festival August 5-12 2025.

== Selected filmography ==
Year	Title	Role	Notes
1988	Da	Young Oliver	Film
1995	Braveheart	Edward, Prince of Wales	Film
1995	Guiltrip	Ronnie	Film
1996–1999	Ballykissangel	Garda Ambrose Egan	Seasons 1–4
2007	My Boy Jack	Major Sparks	Film
