= Kadamba Simmons =

British actress and model (1974–1998)

- Born: 7 May 1974; London, England
- Died: c. 13 June 1998 (aged 24); London, England
- Occupations: Actress; model
- Years active: 1993–1998

Kadamba Simmons (7 May 1974 – c. 13 June 1998) was a British actress and model. Simons had appeared in advertisements for the brands Martini and Pantene.

== Career ==
Simmons appeared in advertisements for many products including Martini and Pantene shampoo. She also had acting roles in several films and appeared in the music video for Extreme's "Stop the World".

== Murder ==
On 13 June 1998, Simmons's naked body was discovered hanging in the shower of a London flat. She had been strangled to death and then hanged by a leather strap. The rest of the flat was awash with blood. Yaniv Malka, Simmons' ex-boyfriend, was arrested later that day and charged with her killing; he claimed her death was part of a suicide pact. He said that they had sex and then she begged him to strangle her. On 29 March 1999, Malka was sentenced to life imprisonment for Simmons' murder. In February 2000, three Appeal Court judges unanimously rejected Malka's claims that he had not received a fair trial.

Malka was transferred to a prison in Israel and was released in 2014.

=== Filmography ===
- The Good Sex Guide (1994)
- Grim (1995)
- Mary Reilly (1996)
- Breeders (1997)
- Cash in Hand (1998)
- It's Different for Girls (1998)
- The Wonderland Experience (2000)
