= Beings (film) =

The Fairy King of Ar
- DVD cover
- Directed by: Paul Matthews
- Written by: Paul Matthews; Christopher Atkins
- Produced by: Elizabeth Matthews; Christopher Atkins; Richard Green
- Starring: Corbin Bernsen; Glynis Barber; Jameson Baltes; Brittney Bomann; Malcolm McDowell
- Cinematography: Peter Thornton
- Edited by: Peter H. Matthews
- Music by: Ben Heneghan; Ian Lawson
- Production company: Peakviewing Productions
- Distributed by: Peakviewing Transatlantic PLC
- Release date: 14 May 1998
- Running time: 93 minutes
- Country: United Kingdom
- Language: English
- Budget: $3.5 million

The Fairy King of Ar (originally released as Beings) is a 1998 British direct-to-video fantasy adventure film co-written, co-produced and directed by Paul Matthews. It stars Corbin Bernsen, Glynis Barber and Malcolm McDowell.

== Plot ==
Since as far back as Kyle and Evie Preston can remember, their grandmother told fantastical tales about fairies who had been trapped underground by giants for thousands of years. Now their grandmother is gone, and the siblings are surprised to discover that she has left them a decrepit gold mine and a family home they never even knew existed. Upon discovering that grandmother's far-fetched stories have a bizarre basis in reality, and that by freeing the fairies from the mine they will discover a cure for their terminally ill father, Kyle and Evie race against time to free the trapped fairies and save their father's life.

== Cast ==
- Corbin Bernsen as Rob Preston
- Glynis Barber as Nancy Preston
- Jameson Baltes as Kyle Preston
- Brittney Bomann as Evie
- Malcolm McDowell as Ian
- Leigh Greyvenstein as Tumbeleen
- Anne Curteis as Elizabeth Ballaugh

== Reception ==
Andy Giese writing for the "Tofu Nerdpunk" praised McDowell's performance, but criticized the CGI and the special effects. Edwin L. Carpenter writing for the Christian website The Dove Foundation called the film "a delight for both kids and adults".
