= Tom McGrath (producer) =

Irish television producer (1930–1985)

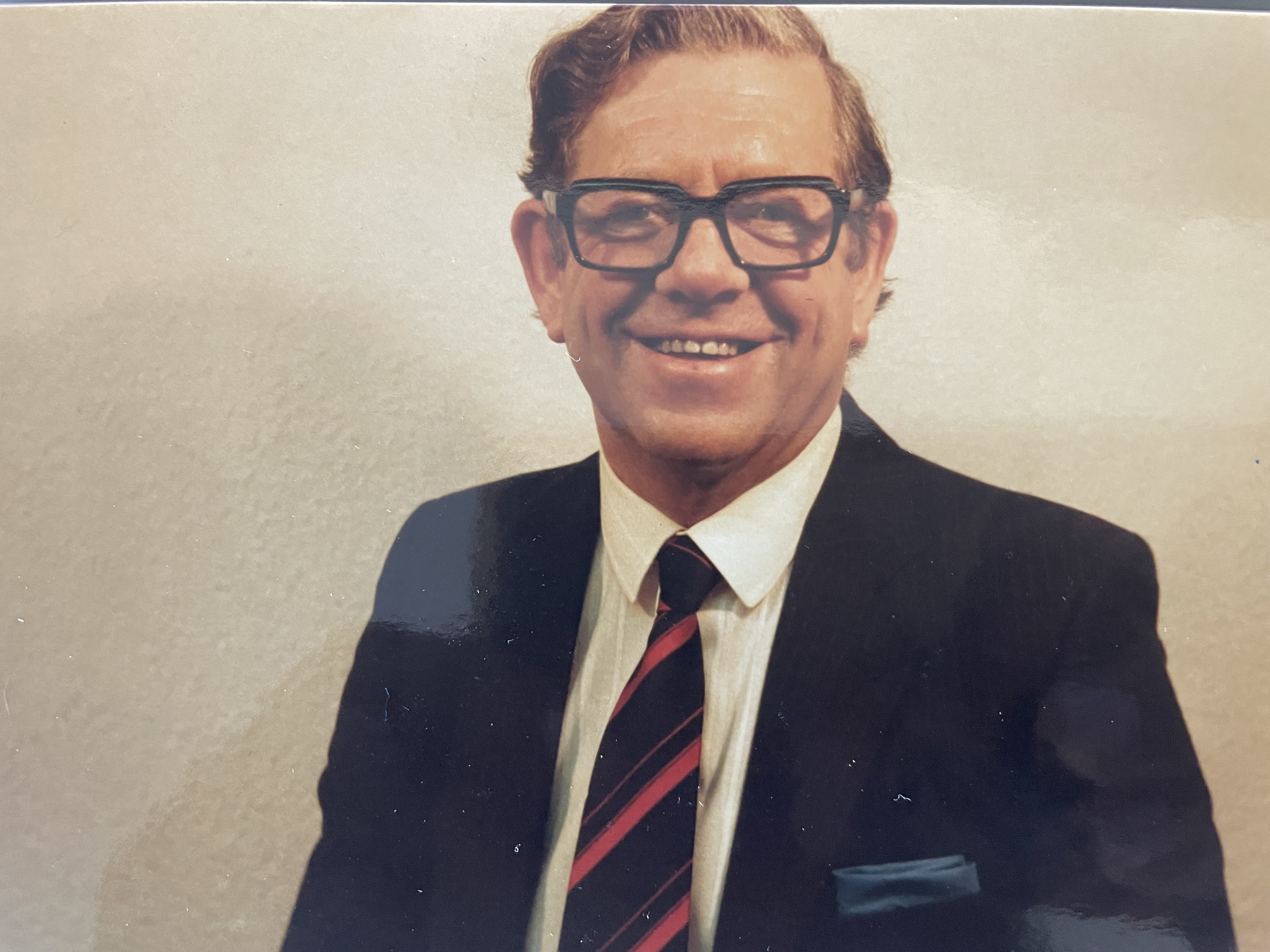
- Born: 22 April 1930
- Died: 10 April 1985 (aged 54)
- Occupation: Television producer
- Known for: Work on The Late Late Show and several Irish entries to Eurovision

Thomas Patrick "Tom" McGrath (22 April 1930 - 10 April 1985) was a television producer at RTÉ Television, Ireland's national broadcaster. He is known for "pioneering" The Late Late Show in 1962, and selecting Gay Byrne to host the show. He was also credited with introducing Terry Wogan and Mike Murphy's first television series. He chose the song "All Kinds of Everything" for the 1970 National Song Contest, and selected Dana to sing it. It won both the national final therefore becoming Ireland's entry, and went on to win the 1970 Eurovision contest. He later produced and directed Ireland's staging of the 1971 Eurovision contest.

== Early life ==
Tom McGrath was born in Dublin on 22 April 1930 and educated at Christian Brothers School, North Brunswick Street, and at St. Canice's, North Circular Road. He later attended the School of Commerce in Rathmines. In his early twenties he emigrated to Canada, and worked in radio and television gaining experience as a producer. After returning to Ireland, McGrath joined RTÉ in 1961 as "cost control executive". He later became the head of light entertainment at RTÉ.

In 1961, he produced his first programme, starring Lelia Doolan, called "The Ballad Singer". Early in 1962, McGrath introduced a weekly quiz show called "Jackpot" and selected Gay Byrne to compere the show. Terry Wogan would later replace Gay Byrne as compere.

== Career ==
=== The Late Late Show ===
While working on television in Canada, McGrath had noted the format of The Tonight Show with Jack Paar and decided to launch an Irish version of this show as a summer filler; a late-night talk show: The Late Late Show. McGrath selected Gay Byrne as host, and produced the first show which was broadcast on 6 July 1962.

RTÉ could not afford to pay the cost of major stars to appear on the show, but Tom McGrath managed to include those stars when they visited Ireland at the cost of highlighting their schedule. McGrath also maintained that no matter how successful a programme was it must not remain unchanged.

=== National Song Contest and Eurovision ===
During 1964/1965, McGrath devised the National Song Contest to select Ireland's entry for the Eurovision. In 1965, he was presented with a Jacob's Award for his presentation of the first National Song Contest. The contest became an annual event produced by Tom McGrath for the first few years.

Dana (later Dana Rosemary Scallon) came second in the National Song Contest of 1969. Later, McGrath contacted Dana and invited her to sing "All Kinds of Everything", composed by Jackie Smith and Derry Lindsay. In 1970, Dana won the Eurovision Song Contest singing "All Kinds of Everything" for Ireland. Winning the 1970 Eurovision contest meant that Ireland would stage the contest in 1971, and McGrath produced and directed the program of the 1971 Eurovision event.

McGrath also produced the 1981 Eurovision in Dublin, following Johnny Logan's win the previous year in the Netherlands with "What's Another Year". In 1984, with Gay Byrne presenting and Tom McGrath producing and directing, Linda Martin won the National song contest with the song "Terminal 3", written by Johnny Logan. According to Martin, Tom McGrath selected her to sing the song, which went on to come second in the Eurovision of that year.

McGrath was also involved with the Tops of the Town and the Castlebar Song Contest.

== Later life and death ==
After a long illness, McGrath died at his home in Foxrock, Dublin on 10 April 1985, aged 55. His funeral Mass was held at the Church of Our Lady of Perpetual Succour in Foxrock and was attended by former colleagues from RTÉ. Music was provided by Earl Gill, with Frank Patterson and others singing. Tom McGrath was survived by his wife Pat and their four children.
