= The Magic Door (film) =

- Directed by: Paul Matthews
- Written by: Paul Matthews
- Produced by: Peter Matthews
- Starring: Jenny Agutter, Mick Walter, Patsy Kensit, Anthony Head
- Cinematography: Peter Moseley
- Edited by: Richard J. Thomas
- Music by: Mark Thomas
- Distributed by: Bear Island Productions
- Release date: 2007
- Running time: 89 minutes
- Country: United Kingdom
- Language: English
- Budget: $1M

The Magic Door is a 2007 British fantasy film directed by Paul Matthews, starring Jenny Agutter, Mick Walter, Patsy Kensit and Anthony Head.

The film was dubbed into German and issued under the title Das Imperium der Elfen ("The Empire of the Elves").

== Outline ==
Sally and Liam, a brother and sister, played by siblings Alix and Liam Matthews, run away from home to escape from their new stepmother, Rachel (Patsy Kensit), and make friends with Raglin, a troll (Mick Walter). They help him to find a magic door which will take him home to Fairyland. Once there, they need to defeat Raglin's bitter enemy the Black Witch (Jenny Agutter).

== Reception ==
A Common Sense Media review is headed "Mild scares in confusing U.K. fantasy movie" and complains that

… there are mild fantasy scares along the order of a young elf constantly hissing in a menacing manner, demonic growls and laughter, and eyes made to look green and demonic through special effects.

When the film was released on DVD in October 2012, The Dove Foundation was unable to recommend it, as one character "damns" another, and it also noted "Sex: Husband kisses wife on forehead."

== Cast ==
- Jenny Agutter as Black Witch
- Patsy Kensit as Rachel
- Anthony Head as George
- Mick Walter as Raglin
- Liam Matthews as Liam
- Alix Matthews as Sally
- Emma Ford as Fairy Princess
- Rebecca Chesney as Fairy
- Lorna Rose Harris as Fairy
- Faye McNaught as Fairy
- Sarah Hulme as Police Constable
- Aaron Taylor-Johnson as Flip
- Tom Petherham as Police Inspector

== Crew ==
- Paul Matthews, director and screenwriter
- Janet Blandford, executive producer
- Patricia Chesney, producer
- Peter Matthews, producer
- Mark Thomas, original music
- Peter Moseley, cinematographer
- Richard J. Thomas, film editor
- Edward Thomas, production designer
- Stephen Nicholas, art director
- Laura Thomas, costume designer
