= Robin Hood (1991 British film) =

- Theatrical release poster
- Directed by: John Irvin
- Screenplay by: Sam Resnick; John McGrath
- Story by: Sam Resnick
- Produced by: Sarah Radclyffe
- Starring: Patrick Bergin; Uma Thurman; Jürgen Prochnow; Edward Fox; Jeroen Krabbé
- Cinematography: Jason Lehel
- Edited by: Peter Tanner
- Music by: Geoffrey Burgon
- Production company: Working Title Films
- Distributed by: 20th Century Fox
- Release date: 13 May 1991
- Running time: 104 minutes
- Country: United Kingdom
- Language: English
- Budget: $15 million or £8.1 million
- Box office: $23 million

Robin Hood is a 1991 British adventure film directed by John Irvin, executive produced by John McTiernan, and starring Patrick Bergin, Uma Thurman, Jürgen Prochnow, Jeroen Krabbé and Edward Fox. Although originally intended for a theatrical release in the United States and South America, the film instead premiered on television, on the Fox network in those territories a month before the release of Robin Hood: Prince of Thieves. It was released in cinemas in several countries in Europe and elsewhere, including Australia, New Zealand and Japan.

== Plot ==
Much the Miller, who is poaching deer on lands belonging to the King Richard I of England, is detected by a hunting party led by the cruel Norman knight Sir Miles Folcanet. Much flees the hunting party until he runs into Saxon earl Robert Hode and his friend Will Scarlett. Much pleads for help and Will urges Hode to intercede, as the Normans arrive threatening to poke Much's eyes out. Folcanet is enraged by Hode's interference and demands that Hode be punished by the local Sheriff (shire-reeve) Roger Daguerre, who is Hode's friend.

Privately Daguerre confides to Hode that he needs peace with Folcanet because he has agreed to give Daguerre a large portion of his niece Marian's wealth once they are married. Publicly, Daguerre orders a single lash of the whip for Hode after he apologizes; Hode is enraged, insulting Daguerre and is outlawed as a result. He flees into Sherwood Forest, meets John Little and the usual cast of Merry Men and under the name Robin Hood, takes up arms and fights against the Norman nobility. After seeing Hode's Merry Men humiliate Folcanet, Marian joins their band in disguise, until disgruntled outlaw Harry recognizes her and betrays her to the Sheriff.

Hode convinces everyone to attack Nottingham Castle to stop the wedding, certain that Marian loves him. Folcanet is slain and Daguerre is convinced to set aside their feud and bless the marriage of Robin and Marian.

== Cast ==
- Patrick Bergin as Sir Robert Hode/Robin Hood
- Uma Thurman as Maid Marian
- Jürgen Prochnow as Sir Miles Folcanet
- Edward Fox as Prince John
- Jeroen Krabbé as Baron Roger Daguerre
- Owen Teale as Will Scarlett
- David Morrissey as Little John
- Alex Norton as Harry
- Jeff Nuttall as Friar Tuck
- Danny Webb as Much the Miller
- Carolyn Backhouse as Nicole Daguerre
- Barry Stanton as Miter
- Conrad Asquith as Lodwick
- Phelim McDermott as Jester

== Production ==
=== Characterisation ===
The film shares some of its underlying plot with the famous 1938 swashbuckler, The Adventures of Robin Hood, concentrating on the struggle between Normans and Saxons. In more detail, the storyline and the identities of the characters differ widely between the two versions.

Although the familiar characters Little John (David Morrissey), Friar Tuck (Jeff Nuttall), Will Scarlet (Owen Teale) and Much the Miller's Son (Danny Webb) appear in this version, the traditional Sheriff of Nottingham and Guy of Gisbourne have been replaced by original antagonists. Baron Roger Daguerre (Jeroen Krabbé) takes the Sheriff's place as the scheming, greedy tax collector, though in this version, he is originally Robin Hood (Patrick Bergin)'s friend, and Sir Miles Folcanet (Jürgen Prochnow) stands in for Guy as the violent, vindictive knight after Robin's head and Maid Marian (Uma Thurman)'s maidenhead. Unlike many modern versions of the story, King Richard does not appear at the end and instead Daguerre is reconciled with Robin and promises a future where Saxons and Normans are treated equally.

=== Filming ===
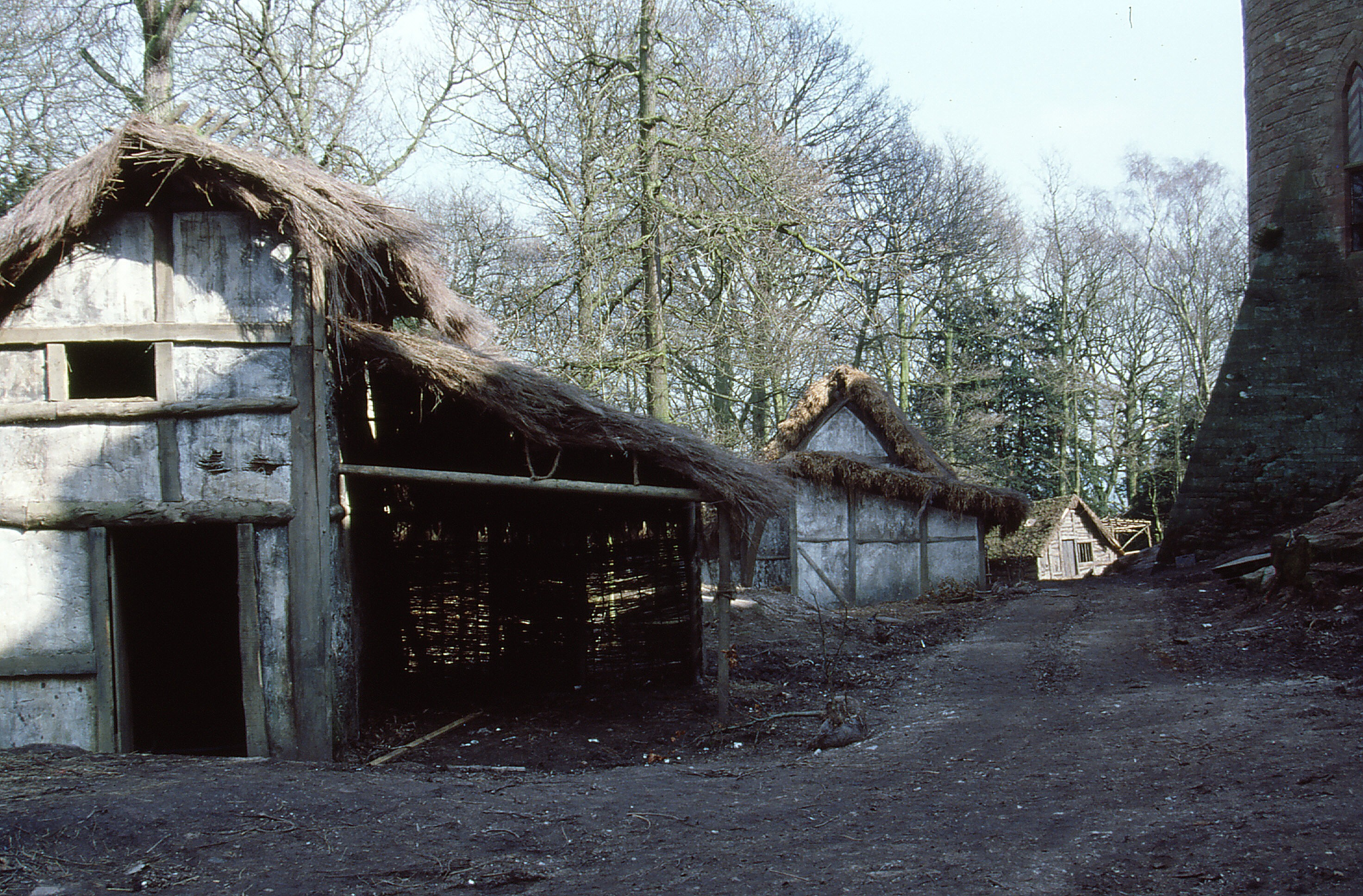
Film set at Peckforton Castle

It was filmed on location at Peckforton Castle in Cheshire, England, a medieval-style Victorian era edifice built between 1842 and 1851. Some filming was also done near Betws-y-Coed in North Wales. Other filming locations were Beeston Castle and various locations within the Frodsham area including Heathercliffe and St Lawrence Church.

== Release ==
20th Century Fox was originally supposed to release Robin Hood only domestically, with Carolco Pictures handling international territories. The deal fell through due to financial problems and as a result, Carolco called off distribution deals for the film. Fox then decided to release Robin Hood internationally as well, starting off with Japan in mid-April 1991, the UK in May and the rest of the world in June. In the United States, the film was broadcast as a three-hour-long television film on the broadcasting block Fox Night at the Movies on 13 May.

The film grossed £387,139 in the United Kingdom and $23 million worldwide.

== See also ==
- List of films and television series featuring Robin Hood
