= Joe Comerford =

Irish film director

- Born: 1947 (age 78–79); Dublin, Ireland
- Education: National College of Art and Design
- Years active: 1969–present
- Known for: Reefer and the Model

Joe Comerford (born 1947) is an Irish film director. His film Reefer and the Model (1988) earned three nominations at the European Film Awards, winning none.

== Career ==
Comerford was born in 1947 in Dublin, Ireland, graduating from the National College of Art and Design in the 1960s. In the 1970s he began working for RTÉ, Ireland's national broadcaster, where he learned camera operation and general studio production. Two years later, he left RTE to make independent films. In 1969 he made Swan Alley. His first public short, Emtigon (1971), was followed by Withdrawal (1973) and Down the Corner (1977). He has directed three feature films: Traveller (1981), written by Neil Jordan; Reefer and the Model (1988); and High Boot Benny (1993). All his films share a general concern for those on the margins of what was an increasingly affluent Irish society.

His short Waterbag (1984) was funded by the Arts Council and the Irish Film Board.

Comerford's films of the 1970s and 1980s featured dysfunctional familial settings, analogous to Ireland's political and religious conditions at the time. His early films have been described as challenging to watch, as they often do not follow a linear narrative, but move forward as a series of vignettes.

In 2008 he filmed the short Roadside, which he later incorporated into the installation Roadside Film Sculpture in 2012.

== Awards ==
Nominated – European Film Awards Best Young Film, 1988
