= Tina Kellegher =

Irish actress

- Born: 30 November 1966 (age 59); Cavan, Ireland
- Occupation: Actress

Tina Kellegher (born 30 November 1966) is an Irish actress, best known for her work in film and television in the 1990s. She currently plays Ger Lynch in the RTÉ soap opera Fair City.

== Early career ==
Kellegher began in theatre, working in Galway in the late 1980s, where she played a variety of roles with the Druid Theatre Company. She also worked with the Abbey Theatre playing, among other roles, Nora Clitheroe in the highly acclaimed production of The Plough and the Stars, opposite Aidan Kelly in 2004.

In 1993, she landed a small role in the Jim Sheridan movie In the Name of the Father. Also in this year, she was cast in one of the roles for which she would become best known: Sharon Curley in Stephen Frears' 1993 film The Snapper. Playing the role of a young woman from a working-class Dublin family dealing with an unintended pregnancy opposite Colm Meaney, she won a British Comedy Award and a best actress award at the Valladolid International Film Festival. The film remains hugely popular in Ireland and was the seventh highest-rated Irish film on Rotten Tomatoes in 2018, a quarter of a century after its initial release. Following this success, she was cast in Scarlett, which was the most expensive TV miniseries ever made at the time.

In 1996, she joined the BBC television series Ballykissangel as Niamh Quigley, the role for which she is best known, for which she won an IFTA.

== Post Ballykissangel ==
After Ballykissangel, she mostly worked in theatre and took smaller roles in TV productions. She is also a well-known voice on BBC Radio 4, having played policewoman Tina Mahon in the first four series of Baldi.

She is married to Gordon Wycherley, location manager on, among other projects, Ballykissangel. They have two sons, Michael, who was born in 2003, and Brian, who was born in 2007. Her brother-in-law is fellow Ballykissangel star Don Wycherley. Kellegher is currently based in Mullingar, County Westmeath, where she is a member of the North Westmeath Hospice committee.

== Filmography ==
=== Film ===
Year	Film	Role	Notes
2020	Herself	Gary's mother	
2014	Standby	Noeleen	
2009	Happy Ever Afters	Karen	
2007	Puffball	Carol	
2006	Showbands II	Gemma	TV movie
2005	Showbands	Gemma	TV movie
1996	The Disappearance of Finbar	Ms. Byrne	
1995	Undercurrent	Susan Hughes	
1994	Widows' Peak	Dolores Furlong	
1993	In the Name of the Father	Policewoman	
1993	The Snapper	Sharon Curley	

=== Television ===
Year	Production	Role
1991	Murder in Eden	Susan
1994	Scarlett	Mary Boyle
1995	The Hanging Gale	Mary Dolan
1996–2001	Ballykissangel	Niamh
2002	Sinners	Sister Bernadette
2002	No Tears	Monica O'Callaghan
2005	The Clinic	Jean Keown
2010	Single-Handed	Teresa Burke
2012	Accused	Katherine Cartwright
2019–	Fair City	Ger Lynch
2020	Normal People	Trish

== Awards and nominations ==
Year	Association	Category	Work	Result
2007	IFTA Film & Drama Awards	Best Actress in a Supporting Role in Television	Showbands II	Nominated
2005	IFTA Film & Drama Awards	Best Actress in a Supporting Role in Television	Showbands	Nominated
2000	IFTA Film & Drama Awards	Best Leading Performance – Television	Ballykissangel	Winner
1993	Valladolid International Film Festival	Best Actress	The Snapper	Winner
