= Patrick Bergin =

Irish actor and singer (born 1951)

- Born: Patrick Connolly Bergin; 4 February 1951 (age 75); Dublin, Ireland
- Occupations: Actor; singer
- Years active: 1970–present
- Spouse(s): Paula Frazier (m. 1992; divorced); Helen Goldin (m. 2024)
- Children: 1

Patrick Connolly Bergin (born 4 February 1951) is an Irish actor and singer. In 1991, he starred opposite Julia Roberts in Sleeping with the Enemy and played the title character in Robin Hood. His other roles include terrorist Kevin O'Donnell in Patriot Games (1992) and the villainous Aidan Maguire in the BBC soap opera EastEnders (2017–2018).

== Early life ==
Bergin was born in Dublin, where he grew up in Drimnagh. His father, Paddy Bergin, was a Labour Party politician who once studied to be a priest with the Holy Ghost Fathers in Blackrock, Ireland. Patrick was one of four sons and one daughter (Pearse, Emmet, Patrick, Allen and Siobhan Bergin). He left Dublin for London in 1973, and by the time he was 17 he was in London running a theatre company. He worked on building sites and at a library. He studied at night and completed an education degree from North London Polytechnic (later the University of North London). He was an English teacher for several years, then formed his own theatrical company because "no one else would have him". His brother Emmet Bergin also became an actor, best known for playing Dick Moran in the soap opera Glenroe for its full 1983–2001 run.

== Career ==
In 1980, Bergin decided to pursue acting full-time and found work in repertory theatre. He played the explorer Sir Richard Francis Burton in Mountains of the Moon (1990) and followed this with diverse acting roles, including a trilogy of Yeats plays; Morphine and Dolly Mixtures, for which he won a BAFTA Cymru Award for Best Actor; Durango, based on John B Keane's novel; hosting TnaG's Suilín Draíochta; and narrating Patrick Cassidy's Famine Remembrance. Bergin played the menacing husband of Julia Roberts' character in the thriller Sleeping with the Enemy (1991). In the same year he portrayed the title character in Robin Hood, opposite Uma Thurman as Maid Marian.

Bergin is also known for his role as Irish terrorist Kevin O'Donnell in the film adaptation of Tom Clancy's Patriot Games (1992). He described 1996 as the lowest point in his career, a time when he rarely received any calls for film roles. In 2013 he appeared in the Scottish film The Wee Man playing notorious Glasgow gangster Arthur 'The Godfather' Thompson. He joined the BBC soap opera EastEnders towards the end of 2017, departing in March 2018.

=== Music ===
Bergin leads the band Patrick Bergin and the Spirit Merchants. They had a top 10 hit in Ireland with their song "The Knacker", released in 2003, which tells the story of a person who recycles horse carcasses and turns them into glue. As a singer, Bergin collaborated with Vlad DeBriansky and appeared on his album Jacks Last Dollar. He also appeared in the video of DJ Steve Mac's song "Paddy's Revenge".

Bergin was onstage singing the Leonard Cohen song "Anthem" as Pope Francis, on his visit to Ireland, arrived in Croke Park for the Festival of Families as part of the World Meeting of Families 2018.

== Charity work ==
In 1993, Bergin bought an old church in County Tipperary and converted it into a poetry centre. He explained: "I've recently come to feel I can encourage children and teenagers with their writing. I'm continually giving groups money to make videos, but I insist that they have a good script. I do it because it makes the difference between them doing a video or not. It doesn't cost a lot, and it gives kids an incredible boost of confidence." In 1998, in response to the murder of a 14-year-old Tallaght boy, Ben Smyth, Bergin helped to establish a special fund to sponsor young children from Tallaght.

== Personal life ==
At a wedding in the early 1980s, Bergin met his future wife, Paula Frazier. They married in Trinidad and Tobago in 1992. They have a daughter. After their divorce, Bergin began dating his friend, Irish widower Helen Goldin, around 2017. Bergin and Goldin married in December 2024, before Christmas, in an intimate ceremony at The Westbury Hotel in Dublin, Ireland.

== Filmography ==
=== Film ===
Year	Title	Role	Notes
1988	Taffin	Mo Taffin	
1988	The Courier	Christy	
1990	Mountains of the Moon	Richard Burton	
1991	Sleeping with the Enemy	Martin Burney	
1991	Robin Hood	Sir Robert Hode / Robin Hood	
1992	Highway to Hell	Beezle	
1992	Love Crimes	David Hanover	
1992	Map of the Human Heart	Walter Russell	
1992	Patriot Games	Kevin O'Donnell	
1992	The Hummingbird Tree	Stephen Holmes	
1993	All Tied Up	Bartender (uncredited)	Direct-to-Video
1994	Double Cross	Jack Conealy	Direct-to-Video
1994	Soft Deceit	Adam Trent	
1996	Lawnmower Man 2: Beyond Cyberspace	Dr. Benjamin Trace	
1996	The Proposition	Rhys Williams	
1996	Angela Mooney	Older Malone	
1997	The Island on Bird Street	Stefan	
1997	Suspicious Minds	Jack Ramsey	
1998	The Lost World	Challenger	
1999	Treasure Island	Billy Bones	
1999	Promise Her Anything	Vernon Fry	
1999	One Man's Hero	General Winfield Scott	
1999	Eye of the Beholder	Alexander Leonard	
1999	Escape Velocity	Cal "Captain of the Harbinger"	
1999	Africa	John Young	
2000	Press Run	Alex Dodge	
2000	When the Sky Falls	Mackey	
2000	Merlin: The Return	King Arthur	
2001	Cause of Death	Taylor Lewis	
2001	The Invisible Circus	Gene	
2001	High Explosive	Jack Randall	
2001	Devil's Prey	Minister Seth	
2001	Silent Grace	Peter, IRA man	
2001	Amazons and Gladiators	Crassius	
2002	Beneath Loch Ness	Blay	
2003	Bloom	The citizen	
2003	The Boys from County Clare	Padjo	
2004	Ella Enchanted	Sir Peter	
2004	Berserker	Thorsson	
2004	High Art, Low Life	Cameron's Driver	
2006	Johnny Was	Flynn	
2006	False Prophets	Karl Hawthorne	
2006	Played	Riley	
2006	Secret of the Cave	Patrick Wallace	
2006	The Far Side of Jericho	Jake	
2007	Casanova's Last Stand	Casanova	
2007	Babyface	John Roth	
2007	The Black Pimpernel	US Ambassador	
2007	Strength and Honour	Papa Boss	
2008	Dick Dickman P.I.	unknown role	
2008	Ghostwood	Fr Paul	
2010	Eva	Oswald	
2011	The McBrearty Affair	Narrator	Short Film
2011	A Kiss and a Promise	Detective Anthony Dolan	
2011	Birthday	Hugo	
2011	Perfect Day	Rick's Father	
2012	Eldorado	Roy	Direct-to-Video
2012	Absolute Fear	Captain Morrow	
2012	Songs for Amy	Patrick	
2012	Shark Week	Tiburon	
2012	Gallowwalkers	Marshall Gaza	
2012	Angel	Successful Man	Short Film
2013	The Wee Man	Arthur Thompason	
2013	Dance of the Steel Bars	Frank	
2013	The Minnitts of Anabeg	Lord Goode	
2014	Margery Booth: The Spy in the Eagle's Nest	Standartenfuhrer Kummel	
2015	Age of Kill	Sir Alistair Montcrief	
2016	Free Fire	Howie	
2016	We Still Steal the Old Way	George Briggs	
2016	Cage	Peter Karl Bradley	
2017	Native	Irish Man	Short Film
2017	Roth	John Roth	
2018	Train Set	Major Julian Muir	
2019	Odilo Fabian or (The Possibility of Impossible Dreams)	The Mayor of Doubt	Short Film
2020	The Last Days of American Crime	Rossi Dumois	
2021	Finding You	Seamus	
2021	The Kindred	Father Monroe	
2022	God's Petting You	The American	
2022	Blackbird	The Head	
2022	The Ulysses Project	Buck Mulligan / Leopold Bloom	
2022	Nutcracker Massacre	Dmitri / Toymaker	
2023	One Ranger	Doc	
2025	Sunphlowers	Tony	

=== Television ===
Year	Title	Role	Notes
1983	Those Glory Glory Days	Spurs Team Member	TV Movie
1987	Boon	DS Beecher	"Credit Where It's Due"
1987	Lapsed Catholics	Paul McNally	TV Movie
1988	Act of Betrayal	Michael McGurk	Miniseries (2 episodes)
1990	The Real Charlotte	Roderick Lambert	Miniseries (3 episodes)
1991	Screen Two	Terence O'Farrell	"Morphine and the Dolly Mixtures"
1992	Frankenstein	Dr. Victor Frankenstein	TV Movie
1993	Children of the Mist	Mark Samules	TV Movie
1994	Twilight Zone: Rod Serling's Lost Classics	Dr. Benjamin Ramsey	TV Movie (segment "Where the Dead Are")
1995	Triple Cross	Jimmy Ray	TV Movie
1996	The Witch's Daughter	Mr. Smith	TV Movie
1997	The Apocalypse Watch	Drew Latham	TV Movie
1997	Stolen Women, Captured Hearts	Daniel Morgan	TV Movie
1997	The Ripper	Inspector Jim Hansen	TV Movie
1999	Durango	Fergus Mullaney	TV Movie
1999	Expedition Journal	N/A	Assistant Producer (1 episode)
2000	St. Patrick: The Irish Legend	Patrick	TV Movie
2001	Jewel	Leston Hilburn	TV Movie
2002	King of Texas	Mr. Highsmith	TV Movie
2002	Dracula	Vladislav Tepes / Dracula	2 episodes
2003	Brush with Fate	Headmaster	TV Movie
2003	Smallville	Morgan Edge	"Shattered"
2005	Icon	Igor Komarov	TV Movie
2005	Casanova's Love Letters	Casanova	Miniseries (1 episode)
2006	Driven	Gerald Workman	"#1.1"
2009	Hustle	Toby Baxter	"Diamond Seeker"
2011	Ice	Quinn	Miniseries (2 episodes)
2016	Fir Bolg	Sean Seoige	2 episodes
2017	No Offense	Earl Kennedy	"#2.1"
2017	Red Rock	Jim Tierney	recurring role (7 episodes)
2017–2018	EastEnders	Aidan Maguire	series regular (32 episodes)
2018	Quantico	Liam Killoran	"Who Are You?"
2019	Wild Bill	Frank McGill	"Nothing Behind the Curtain"
2020	The South Westerlies	Big Mike	recurring role (6 episodes)
2024	FBI: International	Niall Walsh	"Touts"

== Awards and nominations ==
Year	Award	Category	Work	Result
1989	AACTA Awards	Best Performance by an Actor in a Leading Role in a Mini Series	Act of Betrayal	Nominated
1992	BAFTA Cymru	Best Actor (Yr Actor Gorau)	Screen Two	Won
1992	Saturn Awards	Best Supporting Actor	Sleeping with the Enemy	Nominated
2018	International Filmmaker Festival of World Cinema	Best Supporting Actor	Train Set	Nominated
2018	Madrid International Film Festival	Best Supporting Actor	Train Set	Nominated
