= The Big Interview =

- Also known as: The Big Interview with Mike Murphy
- Starring: Mike Murphy
- Country of origin: Ireland
- Original language: English
- No. of episodes: 6

Production
- Production location: Convention Centre Dublin
- Running time: 30 Minutes

Original release
- Network: RTÉ One
- Release: 6 October – 10 November 2011

The Big Interview is an Irish talk show, which was broadcast on RTÉ One in 2011.

Presented by veteran broadcaster Mike Murphy, each episode involves Murphy interviewing a well-known public figure. The series was broadcast each Thursday night at 22:15.

The series were recorded in the Convention Centre Dublin.

== Episodes ==
Date	Guests
6 October 2011	Tommy Tiernan
13 October 2011	Bertie Ahern
20 October 2011	Marian Finucane
27 October 2011	Moya Doherty
3 November 2011	Barry McGuigan
10 November 2011	David McWilliams
