= Patrick Bergin (politician) =

Irish politician and trade union official (1913–1991)

Senator
- In office 22 July 1954 – 22 May 1957
- Constituency: Nominated by the Taoiseach

Personal details
- Born: 6 February 1913 County Carlow, Ireland
- Died: 16 April 1991 (aged 78) Dublin, Ireland
- Party: Labour Party
- Spouse: Nora Bergin
- Children: 5, including Emmet and Patrick
- Education: Blackrock College

Patrick Bergin (6 February 1913 – 16 April 1991) was an Irish politician and trade union official.

He was a Labour Party member of Seanad Éireann from 1954 to 1957. He was nominated by the Taoiseach to the 8th Seanad in 1954. He did not contest the 1957 Seanad election. He stood unsuccessfully for Dáil Éireann as a Labour Party candidate for the Carlow–Kilkenny constituency at the 1948 general election.

His sons are the actors Emmet and Patrick Bergin.
