= Guiltrip =

1995 drama film

- Directed by: Gerard Stembridge
- Screenplay by: Gerard Stembridge
- Produced by: Ed Guiney
- Starring: Andrew Connolly; Jasmine Russell; Peter Hanly; Pauline McLynn
- Cinematography: Eugene O'Connor
- Edited by: Mary Finlay
- Music by: Brendan Power
- Release date: 1995
- Language: English

Guiltrip is a 1995 Irish thriller drama film written and directed by Gerard Stembridge, at his feature film debut. It premiered at the 52nd Venice International Film Festival.

== Cast ==
- Andrew Connolly as Liam
- Jasmine Russell as Tina
- Peter Hanly as Ronnie
- Pauline McLynn as Joan
- Michelle Houlden as Michelle
- Frankie McCafferty as Frank
- Mikel Murfi as Petey
- Rebecca Chapman-Murphy as Baby
- Eamonn Hunt as Armbury Sergeant
- Ray McBride as Security Man

== Production ==
The film's budget was approximately $1 million.

== Release ==
The film premiered at the 52nd edition of the Venice Film Festival, in the Window on Images sidebar.

== Reception ==
Variety's critic David Rooney praised the film, describing it as a "searing portrait of a marriage [...] directed with maturity, intelligence and unblinking focus". Janet Maslin from The New York Times called it a "small but powerfully raw film" that has a "claustrophobic energy". Roberto Nepoti from La Repubblica referred to it as "a personal journey into everyday madness, effectively highlighting its sociological implications without relying on didacticism or moralistic overtones". Time Out also praised the film, describing it as "brutal, bleak, full of the bitterness of life, [...] an impressive, disturbing glimpse of fear and loathing in a provincial Irish town.".

BBC journalist Anwar Brett described the film as "the really shocking film to have made for a man better known for comedy in the theatre and on radio". Paul Lynch from The Times included it in his list of the 100 greatest Irish films. The film was shortlisted by the European Film Academy for the 1996 European Film Award for Best Film.
