= Eve Watkinson =

Irish actress (1909–1999)

- Born: 6 March 1909; Terenure
- Died: 15 November 1999 (aged 90); Monkstown, Dublin, Ireland
- Occupation: Actress

Eve Watkinson (6 March 1909 – 15 November 1999) was an Irish stage, film and television actress.

== Biography ==
Eve Panton Watkinson was born 6 March 1909 in Terenure to Arthur Panton Watkinson and Kate née Hollingsworth. Her father was the director of an interior decorating company called A. Panton Watkinson on St Stephen's Green. She learned acting working with an amateur group in Capel Street called Torch Theatre. She went on to work with Edward and Christine Longford's company based in the Gate Theatre. Watkinson performed in leading roles in plays by Ibsen, Sheridan, Coleman, Shakespeare and Fry. She played the Vampire Monster Mallarka in Carmilla and gained that became her nickname with the company. Left an inheritance enough to live on, Watkinson used the money she earned in acting to produce productions of her own.

Watkinson also spent several years with the Bristol Old Vic Theatre company. When Raidió Teilifís Éireann began to produce television plays, she had several roles including in plays by Dürrenmatt, Christopher Nolan and Frank O'Connor. She went with Torchlight and Laser Beams to the Edinburgh Festival. She also worked as a presenter for RTE Radio. In the 1960s Watkinson narrated stories for children. Watkinson had a role in the 1988 Irish film Reefer and the Model. Watkinson died in Monkstown, Dublin on 15 November 1999.
