= Emmet Bergin =

Irish actor (1944–2024)

- Born: John Emmet Bergin; 3 June 1944; Carlow, Ireland
- Died: 15 March 2024 (aged 79); Dublin, Ireland
- Education: CBS Westland Row
- Occupation: Actor
- Television: Glenroe; The Clinic; The Burke Enigma
- Parent: Paddy Bergin (father)

John Emmet Bergin (3 June 1944 – 15 March 2024) was an Irish actor, best known for playing Dick Moran in the soap opera Glenroe. First appearing in the role in 1983, he played it continually until 2001.

== Early life ==
Bergin was born in Carlow. His father, Paddy Bergin, had worked for Carlow Sugar Factory and was a trade union official and Labour Party politician. He was a Taoiseach's nominee to Seanad Éireann from 1954 to 1957. This appointment resulted in the family moving to Dublin. Bergin was educated at CBS Westland Row but left school at the age of 15 and got a job delivering newspapers.

== Career ==
Bergin took acting lessons at the Brendan Smith Academy. His first job in theatre was as prompter and assistant stage manager in the Eblana Theatre. Bergin toured with the Irish Theatre Company, before signing up to the Abbey School of Acting. He was cast as Joe in the first production of Brian Friel’s Philadelphia, Here I Come! in the Gaiety Theatre in 1964. Bergin's other stage roles in the following years included parts in Sam Shepard's True West, Seán O'Casey's The Silver Tassie, and Henrik Ibsen's Hedda Gabler.

One of Bergin's first film roles was a small part in Ryan's Daughter in 1969. He played Sir Ulfius in Excalibur in 1981. Two years later Bergin became a household name when he was cast in the role of solicitor Dick Moran in the RTÉ soap opera Glenroe. One of his and the soap's biggest storylines was an extra-marital affair with Terry Killeen. Bergin later appeared in the medical drama series The Clinic and was cast as Sunday Independent editor Aengus Fanning in Veronica Guerin in 2003.

== Personal life and death ==
Bergin married his wife Sarah on 25 March 1969, and had a son and a daughter. His son received a suspended sentence for dealing drugs in 2000. His brother, Patrick Bergin, is also an actor.

Bergin died on 15 March 2024, at the age of 79.

== Selected filmography ==
- Flight of the Doves (1971)
- A Portrait of the Artist as a Young Man (1977)
- Excalibur (1981)
- Glenroe (1983)
- Soldier Soldier (1991)
- Veronica Guerin (2003)
