= Lelia Doolan =

Irish producer (born 1934)

- Born: 1934 (age 91–92); Cork, Ireland
- Education: University College Dublin
- Occupation: Television producer

Lelia Doolan (born 1934) is an Irish television producer.

== Early life and education ==
Doolan was born in Cork, Ireland in 1934. She studied French and German at University College Dublin, where she won a scholarship to study at the Brecht Theatre in Germany.

== Career ==
=== Presenting, acting and producing ===
She presented and acted in shows on the newly established RTÉ in 1961 and starred in a short entertainment called "The Ballad Singer", produced by Tom McGrath, a programme preserved in the station's archives. She soon moved into a role as producer/director, after training in the United States. She was responsible for the establishment of The Riordans rural soap opera.

Shortly after being made head of light entertainment, Doolan resigned in protest at the political and commercial policies of RTÉ. She became artistic director of the Abbey Theatre for two years, before studying for her PhD in Anthropology at Queen's University. While she was there, she also worked in community video and adult education in Belfast. Her unpublished Ph.D. thesis at Belfast Queen's University in 1977 was titled "Elements of the Sacred and Dramatic in Some Belfast Urban Enclaves". Lelia Doolan's documentary in 2011 Bernadette: Notes on a Political Journey about Bernadette Devlin screened at the 2011 BFI London Film Festival.

=== Teaching ===
She taught at the College of Commerce, Rathmines (now part of the DIT) between 1979 and 1988, where she established and was head of the first Irish course in Media Communications, teaching Bryan Dobson (news anchor), Fergus Tighe (film director), Anne Cassin (newsreader), and Ned O'Hanlon (U2 and Rolling Stones video director), among others.

In 1987, she produced Reefer and the Model, with director Joe Comerford. In April 1993, she was appointed chairperson of the Irish Film Board, a role she filled for three years before retiring. She was also a founder and director of the Galway Film Fleadh.

== Personal life and views ==
She was once described by Archbishop John Charles McQuaid as "mad, bad, and dangerous". She has been a prominent defender of LGBT rights.

She was involved in opposing both the Burren Interpretative Centre and the Corrib Gas pipeline. She lives in Kilcolgan near Galway, where she tends a herb and vegetable garden.
