= Birdy Sweeney =

Irish comedian and actor (1931–1999)

- Born: Edmund Francis Sweeney; 14 June 1931; Dungannon, County Tyrone, Northern Ireland
- Died: 11 May 1999 (aged 67); Dublin, Ireland
- Other name: Birdy Sweeney
- Occupation: Actor

Birdy Sweeney (14 June 1931 – 11 May 1999) was an Irish actor and comedian.

Birdy was born Edmund Francis Sweeney in Dungannon, County Tyrone. He was one of 10 children. Growing up, Sweeney was a good whistler as a boy. He was nicknamed "Birdy" from his childhood ability to imitate bird calls which he demonstrated on BBC Radio Ulster. He was a stand-up comedian on the club circuit for more than thirty years before he gained his first acting work as an extra in BBC Northern Ireland's adaptation of the play Too Late to Talk to Billy in 1982.

Sweeney made minor appearances in several major films, including The Crying Game (1992), The Hanging Gale (1995), The Snapper (1993) The Butcher Boy (1997), and Angela's Ashes, and made his stage debut in the 1989 Dublin production of The Iceman Cometh at the Abbey Theatre. From 1996, he played farmer Eamon Byrne in the first four series of the BBC drama series Ballykissangel.

== Death ==
Sweeney died on 11 May 1999 at St. Vincent's University Hospital, Dublin, aged 67, He was survived by his wife Alice and their eight children, 6 boys who lived in Philadelphia, Pennsylvania and 2 girls who stayed in Ireland.

== Filmography ==
Year	Title	Role	Notes
1983	Every Picture Tells a Story	Blakes Barman	
1986	The End of the World Man	Workman	
1988	Reefer and the Model	Instant Photo	
1991	Murder in Eden	Crubog	BBC Miniseries
1992	The Crying Game	Tommy	
1996	Moll Flanders	Doctor of Sorts	
1996	Space Truckers	Mr. Zesty	
1996-1999	Ballykissangel	Eamon Byrne	34 episodes
1997	The Butcher Boy	Man in Well	
1997	Downtime	Pat	
1998	The Nephew	Old Codger	
1998	Divorcing Jack	Lift Attendant	
1998	Joint Venture	Arthur	Short
1998	Green Oranges	Tommy	Short
1999	Angela's Ashes	Old Priest	
2011	The Poorhouse Revisited	Gravedigger	(final film role)
