= Owen Roe (actor) =

Irish actor (born 1959)

- Born: 30 May 1959 (age 66); Dublin, Ireland
- Occupations: Actor; theatre director
- Years active: 1970s–present
- Notable work: Scrap Saturday

Owen Roe (born 30 May 1959) is an Irish stage, film, and television actor. He performed as a satirist on Irish radio. He is also a playwright and has worked as a theatrical director.

== Early life ==
Roe was born in Dublin in 1959.

== Career ==
Roe studied at the Oscar School of Acting and the Brendan Smith Academy in the late 1970s.

Roe has been a prolific stage actor for decades. He won an Irish Theatre Award for playing Claudius in Hamlet. He also won a Special Tribute Award at The Irish Times Theatre Awards 2019. He also wrote one play, Fear of Feathers, staged at the Andrews Lane Theatre in 1991.

On TV, Roe has appeared on Scarlett, The Ambassador, Ballykissangel, Rásaí na Gaillimhe, Penny Dreadful, Vikings and Fair City., and as Oliver Cromwell in The History Channel Documentary "Cromwell: God's Executioner" based on the book by Professor Micheál Ó Siochrú

He has appeared in several films, mostly made in Ireland, including Michael Collins (as Arthur Griffith), Intermission and Breakfast on Pluto. He has received three IFTA nominations.

On radio, Roe was one-third of the Scrap Saturday political satire series, and is best remembered for his impression of P. J. Mara, loyal adviser to Charles Haughey. He also appeared on Baldi (BBC Radio 4) as Inspector Rynne.

== Personal life ==
Roe lives in Dublin. He is married to the actress and writer Michèle Forbes; they have two children.
