= About Adam =

2001 film by Gerard Stembridge

- US film poster
- Directed by: Gerard Stembridge
- Written by: Gerard Stembridge
- Produced by: Anna Devlin; Marina Hughes
- Starring: Kate Hudson; Stuart Townsend; Frances O'Connor
- Cinematography: Bruno de Keyzer
- Edited by: Mary Finlay
- Music by: Adrian Johnston
- Production companies: Miramax Films; BBC Films; Irish Film Board; Venus Productions
- Distributed by: Miramax Films (US); Metrodome Distribution (UK)
- Release dates: 19 January 2001 (IRL); 30 March 2001 (UK); 18 May 2001 (US)
- Running time: 105 minutes
- Countries: Ireland; United Kingdom; United States
- Language: English

About Adam is a 2000 romantic comedy film written and directed by Gerard Stembridge and starring Kate Hudson, Stuart Townsend, and Frances O'Connor. The plot focuses on the effect a seductive young man has on four siblings.

== Plot ==
Adam is a young Dubliner who ingratiates himself into the Owens family after meeting Lucy at the restaurant where she waits tables and sings. While wooing her, he becomes involved with her more reserved older sister Laura, a romantic literary type who spends most of her time at the library; her oldest married sister Alice, a new mother who is unhappy with her boring husband Martin; and her brother David, who seeks Adam's advice on how to seduce his repressed girlfriend, only to find himself nearly succumbing to Adam's charms himself.

Revisits are made to several scenes, each seen from the point-of-view of a different character.

== Cast ==
- Stuart Townsend as Adam
- Kate Hudson as Lucy Owens
- Frances O'Connor as Laura Owens
- Rosaleen Linehan as Peggy Owens
- Charlotte Bradley as Alice Owens Rooney
- Alan Maher as David Owens
- Brendan Dempsey as Martin Rooney

== Production ==
Kate Hudson performs "The Man I Love" by George and Ira Gershwin, "You Do Something to Me" by Cole Porter, and "All the Way" by Sammy Cahn and Jimmy Van Heusen. During the closing credits, Peggy Lee performs "Sisters" by Irving Berlin.

The film premiered at the Sundance Film Festival in January 2000 and was shown at the Karlovy Vary Film Festival in the Czech Republic in July 2000 but wasn't released theatrically until it opened in Ireland in January 2001. It was given a very limited release in the U.S., where it grossed $159,668.

== Critical reception ==
On the review aggregator website Rotten Tomatoes, 68% of 56 critics' reviews are positive, with an average rating of 6/10. The website's consensus reads: "Although some of the characters' motivation may not be that clear, the movie is still a funny and sexy charmer." Metacritic, which uses a weighted average, assigned the film a score of 64 out of 100, based on 17 critics, indicating "generally favorable" reviews.

Stephen Holden of The New York Times said "Guilt-free and nearly devoid of erotic angst, About Adam is the flip side of movies like Teorema, Something for Everyone and those slogging Tennessee Williams dramas in which an irresistible, omnisexual stud is often an angel of death. Here he is an angel of sexual health in an impossibly euphoric world where sibling rivalry and sexual jealousy are only passing twinges of discomfort, not consuming passions. The movie's blissful spirits coincide with its portrait of modern, freshly-scrubbed-looking Dublin as the closest thing to a Fun City the British Isles have to offer nowadays."

Emanuel Levy of Variety called the film "smartly sexy," a "brightly observed narrative," and "a frolic free of any judgments ... marked by Stembridge's sparkling wit." He added, "Stembridge plays with shifting perspectives in a fresh manner that defies expectations of the romantic genre ... This literate ensembler is propelled by talent behind and in front of the camera. Townsend, who physically resembles the young Terence Stamp, is perfectly cast as the dark, spirited outsider. The rest of the mostly female cast is equally deft and attractive."

Maitland McDonagh of TV Guide rated it three out of four stars, calling it "sweet, likable and consistently engaging, if so insubstantial that it's always on the verge of blowing away" and adding, "Townsend pulls off the unenviable job of making Adam a chameleon-like seducer without allowing him to seem like a cad or a callous sexual opportunist ... Stembridge deftly balances genre expectations with just enough stylistic flourishes to make it feel surprisingly fresh. The movie starts to fade from memory as soon as it's over, but for an hour and a half it's a pleasantly diverting lark."
