= Murder in Eden (TV series) =

Television series

- Genre: Crime drama
- Based on: Bogmail by Patrick McGinley
- Written by: Shane Connaughton
- Directed by: Nicholas Renton
- Starring: Peter Firth; Ian Bannen; Alun Armstrong; Tony Doyle; Tina Kellegher; Sean Lawlor
- Country of origin: Ireland
- Original language: English
- No. of series: 1
- No. of episodes: 3

Production
- Producer: Robert Cooper
- Cinematography: Dave Bennett
- Running time: 55 minutes
- Production company: BBC Worldwide

Original release
- Network: BBC1
- Release: 19 July – 2 August 1991

Murder in Eden is a British television crime drama, consisting of three fifty-minute episodes, that first broadcast on 19 July 1991 on BBC1. The series stars Alun Armstrong as Sergeant McGing, a police officer in rural County Donegal who investigates when Tim Roarty (Tony Doyle), the landlord of a local pub, murders his barman after being blackmailed by one of the other inhabitants of the village. While the police are busy hunting for the killer, parts of the victim's body continue to resurface. The miniseries was written by Shane Connaughton and directed by Nicholas Renton.

The series was based on the novel Bogmail by author Patrick McGinley, first published in 1978. The series was filmed in and around the Glencolmcille and Teelin areas in 1990. The series co-starred Ian Bannen and Peter Firth as quarrelling neighbours Canon Loftus and Kenneth Potter. In 2016, just short of twenty-five years after it first aired, Murder in Eden was uploaded in full to YouTube, thought to be first time it had resurfaced since its original broadcast. Notably, it has yet to be released on DVD.

There is to a new series to be added called “Weekend at Alan’s” ... All to be confirmed in due course.

== Cast ==
- Peter Firth as Kenneth Potter
- Ian Bannen as Canon Loftus
- Alun Armstrong as Sergeant McGing
- Tara MacGowran as Nora Hession
- Tony Doyle as Tim Roarty
- Tina Kellegher as Susan
- Garrett Keogh as Gimp Gillespie
- Sean Lawlor as Rory Rua
- Frankie McCafferty as Cor Mogaill
- Breffni McKenna as Eamonn Eales
- Trevor Moore as Postman
- Maeve Connelly as Cecily
- P.G. Stephens as Dr McGorrigle
- Birdy Sweeney as Crubog

== Episodes ==
No.	Title	Directed by	Written by	British air date
1	"Episode 1"	Nicholas Renton	Shane Connaughton	19 July 1991
The sleepy fishing village of Glenkeel in Ireland's County Donegal is about to have its population reduced by one. Delighted Sergeant McGing (Alun Armstrong) has dreamed of a good murder for years. But someone's ahead of him. They already know who's done it. And the murderer knows they know when he opens a letter signed 'The Bogmailer'.
2	"Episode 2"	Nicholas Renton	Shane Connaughton	26 July 1991
The sleepy village of Glenkeel finds itself wide awake when Sergeant McGing finds the severed foot of the missing barman hanging from his door knocker. Meanwhile, Englishman Kenneth Potter (Peter Firth)'s feud with Canon Loftus (Ian Bannen) hots up.
3	"Episode 3"	Nicholas Renton	Shane Connaughton	2 August 1991
More bits of the missing barman begin turning up in Glenkeel. Meanwhile, the Bogmailer's letters to Roarty (Tony Doyle) become increasingly outrageous in style and content, while Potter's affair with the Canon's housekeeper may yet prove to be life threatening.
