= Grim (film) =

- 1996 VHS cover
- Directed by: Paul Matthews
- Written by: Paul Matthews
- Produced by: Elizabeth Matthews
- Starring: Emmanuel Xuereb; John Chancer; Tres Hanley; Kadamba Simmons
- Cinematography: Alan M. Trow
- Edited by: Peter H. Matthews
- Production company: Peakviewing
- Distributed by: A-Pix Entertainment, Inc.
- Release date: 13 February 1996
- Running time: 86 minutes
- Country: United Kingdom
- Language: English
- Budget: £650,000 - 1 million

Grim is a 1996 horror film directed by Paul Matthews and was his directorial debut.

== Plot ==
One evening a group of friends, Katie, Steve, Trish, and Sarah gather to play with a spirit board. During the encounter Katie is possessed by a supernatural creature that has been imprisoned in the cave systems lying underneath the town of Woodland Hills, Virginia. Known as the Grim, the creature forces the possessed Katie into verbally granting it freedom. Now free to do as it pleases, the creature begins to magically travel under the town and attack various animals, as well as kidnap a random woman, Mary. His activity causes sinkholes to form, which almost all of the townspeople assume this is the result of a nearby mining company trying to expand their tunnels. The only ones who question this is Katie and her friend Steve, who are certain that they are tied to the other night's events.

An official, Rob, is dispatched to the town due to his familiarity with the tunnels. An impromptu spelunking crew is set up comprising Rob, his former sweetheart Penny, Steve, Katie, Trish, Ken, and Sarah. Once in the tunnels the Grim slaughters Trish. Initially unaware of Trish's death, the group decides to search for her, during which time the Grim kills Steve. He also abducts Ken and Sarah, taking them back to his lair, where he is keeping a now insane Mary captive. Attempts to kill the Grim with dynamite are unsuccessful and when Rob and the others rescue his captives they are forced to leave Wendy behind due to her insanity and the Grim possessing her. As they flee they are attacked by the Grim and Ken dies, leaving only Katie, Rob, and Penny. They find the location where the Grim was imprisoned and Rob realizes that it is vulnerable to bright light and that sunlight will cause it to be once more imprisoned. They manage to detain the Grim with flashlights, however the Grim grabs Katie just as the sun hits it, imprisoning them both together. Now traumatized, Rob and Penny leave the tunnel. A later scene shows that crews were unable to find Mary, who is still in the Grim's lair.

== Cast ==
- Emmanuel Xuereb as Rob
- John Chancer as Steve
- Tres Hanley as Penny
- Kadamba Simmons as Katie
- Peter Tregloan as Grim
- Michael Fitzpatrick as Ken
- Jules de Jongh as Sarah
- Nesba Crenshaw as Trish
- Nadia DeLemeny as Mary
- Louise Hickson as Wendy

== Production ==
The film was shot in the Spring of 1995 at the Clearwell Caves at Clearwell in the Forest of Dean, Gloucestershire, England. Liz Matthews of PeakViewing Transatlantic has stated that the film had a budget of almost one million pounds; Matty Budrewicz of The Schlock Pit reported a budget of £650,000 in their review of the film.

== Release ==
Grim was released direct-to-video in the United States on 13 February 1996 through A-Pix Entertainment; it did not release in the United Kingdom until the summer of 1999.

== Reception ==
Clive Davies reviewed Grim in Spinegrinder, calling it a "stupid, cheap horror flick with tacky visual FX". John Kenneth Muir criticized the characters as being "only vaguely distinguishable" from one another and that "If this isn't the most boring, empty horror film ever made, it has to be in contention."

In contrast, Matty Budrewicz noted that "Its pleasing, pulpy tone feels like a homage to the work of Guy N. Smith (particularly the author’s 1988 novel, Cannibals), and several trace elements of plot prefigure what’s arguably the best Brit shocker of the last twenty years, The Descent (2005)."
