= Mick Walter =

English actor (born 1955)

- Born: Michael E. Walter; 1955 (age 70–71); Huddersfield, Yorkshire, England
- Occupations: Actor; musician; puppeteer
- Years active: 1983–present

Mick Walter (born Michael E. Walter, 1955), often referred to by the stage name Big Mick, is an English actor, musician and puppeteer. He is known for appearing in television comedies, first appearing as Jack Large in Blackadder. He has also appeared in Black Books, Green Wing, Toast of London and Psychoville.

He has appeared in the BBC's adaptations of three of The Chronicles of Narnia: in 1988, he played the White Witch's dwarf in The Lion, the Witch and the Wardrobe, in 1989, he played Trumpkin in Prince Caspian, and again in 1990 in The Silver Chair. He also appeared in Lexx, most notably as the cross-dressing Titania. His film roles include Dazzle (1999) as Bodkin, Pets (1999) as Mick and The Last Leprechaun (1998) as Finn Regan McCool. In April 2006, Walter appeared in an episode of the ITV soap opera Emmerdale as bit-part character Billy Trotter, and in 2007 as Raglin, a troll, in the British film The Magic Door.

In 2010, he appeared in panto at the Alhambra Theatre, Bradford as one of the Seven Dwarves in Snow White.

Walter is 1.19 metres (3 ft 11 in) in height. Before he became an actor, he was a drummer for Wild Oates, a three-piece band based in Huddersfield.
