= The Last Leprechaun =

1998 television film by David Lister

- Genre: Drama; fantasy
- Written by: Paul Matthews
- Directed by: David Lister
- Starring: Veronica Hamel; Jack Scalia; Mick Walter
- Music by: Neill Solomon
- Country of origin: United Kingdom / South Africa
- Original language: English

Production
- Producers: Paul Matthews; Elizabeth Matthews
- Production locations: Around Johannesburg, South Africa
- Cinematography: Vincent G. Cox
- Editor: Erica Luttich
- Running time: 93 minutes
- Production company: Peakviewing
- Budget: $3.5 million

Original release
- Network: BBC
- Release: 27 October 1998

The Last Leprechaun is a BBC-broadcast television fantasy film of 1998, directed by David Lister and starring Veronica Hamel, Jack Scalia, and Mick Walter.

== Plot ==
Tommy and Ethel Barridge, the two children of multi-millionaire American businessman Henry Barridge, are sent to Ireland to spend their summer holiday with Laura Duvann, a woman who is engaged to him. However, they find out that she’s actually a banshee with very strong black magic powers who acts ill-tempered and very disrespectful towards them (mostly Tommy). Laura is busy cutting down trees on her estate and is also planning the destruction of the last king of the little people, or leprechauns. Tommy and Ethel take their father’s side and also have to figure out a plan to save their new friend, Finn Regan McCool (Finn for short) the leprechaun from their evil stepmother-to be and her estate company.

== Cast ==
- Veronica Hamel as Laura Duvann
- Jack Scalia as Henry Barridge
- Brittney Bomann as Ethel Barridge
- Andrew J. Ferchland as Tommy Barridge
- David Warner as Simpson, Laura Duvann's Butler
- Mick Walter as Finn Regan McCool, The Leprechaun
- Victor Melleney as Farmer Ned
- Douglas Bristow as Sam
- Jocelyn Broderick as Mary, Laura Duvann's Cook
- Wilson Dunster as Foreman
- Anthony Bishop as Logger
- Nicky Rebelo as Kim
- Alessandra Bowles as Being
