= Mike Murphy (presenter) =

Irish radio and TV presenter (born 1941)

- Born: Michael James Murphy; 20 October 1941 (age 84); Dublin, Ireland
- Education: St. Louis National School; Terenure College; Synge Street CBS; Coláiste Mhuire
- Occupations: Broadcaster; actor; property developer
- Notable work: The Live Mike; Winning Streak; The Big Interview
- Spouse(s): Eileen (divorced); Ann Walsh
- Children: 4

Michael James Murphy (born 20 October 1941) is an Irish broadcaster, actor and property developer. He is best known for his long broadcasting career with RTÉ, presenting many TV shows such as The Live Mike, Winning Streak and The Big Interview.

== Early life ==
Murphy was born in Dublin on 20 October 1941. He was the eldest of five children born to Ned and Kitty Murphy. He was educated at St. Louis National School, Terenure College, Synge Street CBS and Coláiste Mhuire.

== Early career ==
Murphy worked as a draper in a Dublin drapery shop, before finding a job with the Castrol Oil Company. He later became involved in acting with the Dublin Shakespeare Society and wrote scripts for sponsored programmes on Radio Éireann. He later joined the Brendan Smith Academy of Acting in Dublin where his acting took him all over Europe. He also went on to play a small part in The Girl with Green Eyes, the film of the novel by Edna O'Brien.

This led him to further acting parts in a number of films on the newly established Telefís Éireann.

== Broadcasting career ==
Tom mcGrath introduced Mike Murphy to RTE. Murphy began his broadcasting career as an announcer with RTÉ Radio in 1965. By 1968 he had established his reputation as an announcer and a radio presenter. He then began presenting on television, starting with one series of a pop show called The Go-Two Show, and filling in as an announcer on the game show, Jackpot. In 1969 he joined the RTÉ's newsroom as a sports announcer.

His big break in television came in 1971 when he was asked to present the National Song Contest, one of the highest rated programmes at the time. He regularly hosted the Castlebar Song Contest. This led to him getting his own variety show, The Likes of Mike. The show did well, running for a few series. From 1972 until 1977 and again in 1979 and 1988, Murphy was the regular Eurovision Song Contest commentator for RTÉ television viewers. In addition he also hosted The National Song Contest (Irish heats for the Eurovision) between 1971 and 1972 and from 1974 until 1979, then in 1981 and 1982 and again in 1986.

He went on to present a travel programme called Murphy’s America, and later the spin-off show, Murphy’s Australia. Following the success of the former programme, he was asked to present Morning Call on radio. Between 1979 and 1982, he presented his own Friday night show, The Live Mike, which was a success and ran for three series. Murphy won four Jacob's Awards. He received his first in 1978 for Murphy's America. A year later, The Live Mike brought him a second trophy. His third award was in 1988 for his series, Murphy's Australia. Meanwhile, in 1980, his Morning Call show on RTÉ Radio led to Murphy winning a Jacob's Radio Award. He also presented the TV quiz show Murphy's Micro Quiz-M.

In 1988, he began presenting The Arts Show on RTÉ Radio 1, and in 1990, the Saturday night television game show, Winning Streak. Around this time, Murphy was the face of the Warner Gift Portfolio promotion from Warner Home Video in the UK and Ireland. In 2000 he retired from radio broadcasting and was the subject in the same year of a special tribute edition of The Late Late Show. He gave his last radio broadcast as the presenter of The Arts Show that year and continued to present Winning Streak until 2001, when he retired from television broadcasting.

=== Break from broadcasting ===
Between 2001 and 2011, he took a break from broadcasting to focus on property developing, though continued to appear in the media during this time. A two-part documentary series, The Lives of Mike, was broadcast in 2008. The series focused on Murphy's part in The Live Mike.

=== Return to broadcasting ===
In 2011, Murphy returned to broadcasting by presenting a new show called The Big Interview where he meets people who have made a significant impact on Ireland.

In 2012, he presented the arts show Masterpiece: Ireland's Favourite Painting, in which Murphy criticised RTÉ for having the show air after Prime Time, at 22:15 on RTÉ One.

In December 2015, Mike Murphy returned with a new show called Play It By Year on RTÉ One, a new archive footage quiz show. Play It By Year pitted teams against each other answering questions based on RTÉ's extensive archives including footage from some much loved quiz shows of the past. The show was broadcast in four parts over Christmas 2015 on RTÉ One, from Sunday 27 December until Wednesday 30 December 2015.

== Personal life ==
Murphy and his first wife Eileen divorced in 1995. They had four children. He later married Ann Walsh, who was his producer on The Arts Show.

In May 2001, Murphy underwent heart surgery, which involved him receiving a triple bypass.

Murphy has an interest in the arts and property developing, and he became an executive director of Harcourt Developments, a property company founded by Pat Doherty, with interests throughout Ireland, Britain, the Caribbean and the United States. He was responsible for marketing, and the job allowed him to continue his interest in the arts.

On 28 March 2011, Murphy announced he was to resign from Harcourt Developments.

Media offices
Preceded by Noel Andrews	Eurovision Song Contest Ireland Commentator; 1972–1977	Succeeded by Larry Gogan
Preceded by Larry Gogan	Eurovision Song Contest Ireland Commentator; 1979	Succeeded by Larry Gogan
Preceded by Marty Whelan	Eurovision Song Contest Ireland Commentator; 1988	Succeeded by Ronan Collins and Michelle Rocca
Preceded by ----	Host of Winning Streak; 1990–2001	Succeeded by Derek Mooney
