= Ballykissangel =

British television drama series (1996–2001)

- Series title card
- Genre: Drama; Soap opera
- Starring: Dervla Kirwan; Stephen Tompkinson; Tony Doyle; Tina Kellegher
- Country of origin: Ireland
- Original language: English
- No. of series: 6
- No. of episodes: 58

Production
- Executive producers: Conor Harrington; Alan Moloney
- Production locations: Enniskerry and Avoca, County Wicklow, Ireland
- Running time: 50 minutes
- Production company: World Productions

Original release
- Network: BBC One
- Release: 11 February 1996 – 15 April 2001

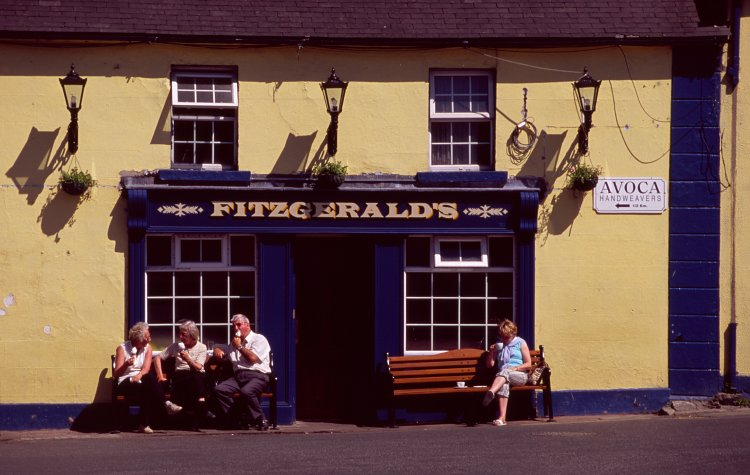
Fitzgerald's, a pub in Avoca that was used as a primary exterior set in the series.

Ballykissangel is a BBC television drama created by Kieran Prendiville and set in Ireland, produced in-house by BBC Northern Ireland. The original story revolved around a young English Roman Catholic priest as he became part of a rural community. It ran for six series, which were first broadcast on BBC One in the United Kingdom from 11 February 1996 to 15 April 2001. It aired in Ireland on RTÉ One and in Australia on ABC TV from 1996 to 2001. Repeats have been shown on Drama in the United Kingdom and the series also has been shown in the United States on some PBS affiliates.

The series was made and set during the Celtic Tiger economic period in Ireland and this features mainly through Tony Doyle's character, Brian Quigley. The show is also set amid the backdrop of the Catholic Church scandal and explores controversial themes of the time such as divorce (which had been legalised only a year before the series began), and pre-marital sex. Dervla Kirwan's and Niall Tóibín's characters are often at odds, symbolising the social conflict between traditional Ireland and social liberalisation.

Significant changes in the cast occurred at the end of series 3, following the departure of central characters Peter Clifford and Assumpta Fitzgerald. Several new characters were brought in and characters that previously had little story were expanded, such as Kathleen, Niamh, Frank and Brian.

The show faced a decline in ratings from a peak level of ten million viewers to 4.8 million and was eventually cancelled in 2001.

The name of the fictional village in which the show was set is derived from Ballykissane, a townland near Killorglin in County Kerry, where the show's creator, Kieran Prendiville, holidayed with his family as a child. The village's name in Irish is shown as "Baile Coisc Aingeal", which means "The town of the fallen angel", on the sign outside the post office.

The show was filmed in Avoca and Enniskerry in County Wicklow.

== Main cast ==
- Tina Kellegher as Niamh Quigley
- Niall Tóibín as Father Frank MacAnally
- Frankie McCafferty as Donal Doherty
- Joe Savino as Liam Coughlan
- Áine Ní Mhuirí as Kathleen Hendley
- Deirdre Donnelly as Siobhan Mehigan
- Gary Whelan as Brendan Kearney
- Stephen Tompkinson as Fr. Peter Clifford (Series 1–3)
- Dervla Kirwan as Assumpta Fitzgerald (Series 1–3)
- Tony Doyle as Brian Quigley (Series 1–5)
- Birdy Sweeney as Eammon Byrne (Series 1–5)
- Peter Hanly as Ambrose Egan (Series 1–5)
- Bosco Hogan as Dr Michael Ryan (Series 1–5)
- Peter Caffrey as Padraig O'Kelly (Series 1–4)
- Don Wycherley as Aidan O'Connell (Series 4–5)
- Lorcan Cranitch as Sean Dillon (Series 4–5)
- Colin Farrell as Danny Byrne (Series 4–5)
- Kate McEnery as Emma Dillon (Series 4–5)
- Victoria Smurfit as Orla O'Connell (Series 4–5)

== Episodes ==
The programme ran for six series, from 11 February 1996 to 15 April 2001. Almost all episodes were 50 minutes in duration.

=== Series overview ===
Series	Episodes	Originally released	
Series	Episodes	First released	Last released
1	6	11 February 1996	17 March 1996
2	8	5 January 1997	23 February 1997
3	12	21 December 1997	4 May 1998
4	12	20 September 1998	6 December 1998
5	12	26 September 1999	28 December 1999
6	8	1 March 2001	15 April 2001

=== Series 1 (1996) ===
No. overall	No. in series	Title	Original release date
1	1	"Trying to Connect You"	11 February 1996
Father Peter Clifford arrives from England, transferred from Manchester to the small, remote Irish village of Ballykissangel. The first person he meets is Assumpta Fitzgerald, the landlady and publican at Fitzgerald's, who hints that he will be unwelcome there. Off to a challenging start, he tries to get acquainted with the quirks of his congregation. Niamh Quigley, daughter of wealthy town businessman Brian Quigley, has a questionable scheme to discover whether her boyfriend Ambrose, the village Garda (policeman), will make a good husband. Also, Brian has ordered for the church a deluxe automated confessional, complete with air conditioning and fax machine, which proves very awkward. Fr Clifford panics at not having a vehicle to visit his parishioners in remote locations. He is also uncomfortable with Father Frank MacAnally (Fr Mac), his regional superior.
2	2	"The Things We Do for Love"	18 February 1996
Brian Quigley is frustrated by Fr Clifford interfering in his effort to evict a family living in a caravan; the local football match takes on unexpected importance. Meanwhile, an attractive woman from Fr Clifford's past arrives uninvited. Lena Headey guest stars.
3	3	"Live in My Heart and Pay No Rent"	25 February 1996
Widower Quigley is ready to rekindle an old flame while his daughter, Niamh, is looking forward to marrying her beloved Ambrose. Unfortunately, after a close encounter, Ambrose has other ideas and the planned wedding is in jeopardy.
4	4	"Fallen Angel"	3 March 1996
The townspeople are fascinated by a local pirate radio station whose mysterious DJ, along with music, broadcasts the personal news of Ballyk, until Ambrose finally locates the illegal transmitter. Fr Mac insists Fr Clifford must be a 'mobile' priest, but his driving lessons with Assumpta might not be such a good idea. Fr Clifford visits and bonds with a retired judge in hospital before he dies, who had been bitterly agnostic since losing his wife.
5	5	"The Power and the Gory"	10 March 1996
A death in the village necessitates a by-election. The fight is on between Sean Dooley and Brian Quigley. Ambrose finally agrees to a church wedding. Assumpta's former boyfriend Leo comes to the village to report on the election campaign. Liam and Donal accidentally exhume a 50-year-old skeleton.
6	6	"Missing You Already"	17 March 1996
Brian organises a local festival, but Assumpta is less than enthusiastic when it turns out to be a cover-up to steal business from Fitzgerald's. Ambrose and Niamh are finally wed in church, amid the confusion of the busy festival, and Fr Clifford learns he's to be sent back to England – but are the villagers as keen for him to go as Fr Mac is?

=== Series 2 (1997) ===
No. overall	No. in series	Title	Original release date
7	1	"For One Night Only"	5 January 1997
Sparks fly when Fr Clifford casts Assumpta in an amateur dramatics play. She objects to playing the love scenes, but Enda arrives in the village and agrees to play the romantic lead.
8	2	"River Dance"	12 January 1997
The village rallies around Brendan Kearney when he loses his teaching position due to a drop in student enrollment. Elsewhere, there's a gold rush in Ballyk and Fr Clifford is not pleased with Liam and Donal's scheme to use a statue of the Virgin Mary to attract paying tourists.
9	3	"In the Can"	19 January 1997
Former one-hit wonder Enda Sullivan takes Assumpta on a date, and Fr Clifford recruits him to play at a Gospel Mass. Meanwhile, Brian Quigley attempts to produce and direct a tourist film.
10	4	"The Facts of Life"	26 January 1997
Peter finds an abandoned newborn on his doorstep and is able to track down the teenage mother and reunite them. Ambrose slips in the bathtub, and a new Garda arrives in Ballyk, who is very strict. Against Father Mac's wishes, Peter gives a speech about relationships to the town youth.
11	5	"Someone to Watch over Me"	2 February 1997
Brian Quigley takes ribbing after he hires an attractive, flirtatious housekeeper who secretly schemes to marry him. Local children vex Peter and the storekeeper with their mischief. Niamh, feeling depressed after her miscarriage, starts helping at the elementary school.
12	6	"Only Skin Deep"	9 February 1997
Brian Quigley sets up a town beauty contest as part of the village festival. Brendan tries to console Siobhan over her plain looks, and they end up sleeping together, while Peter and Ambrose try to reform a young student who tried to take Niamh's purse.
13	7	"Money, Money, Money"	16 February 1997
A late-night fire guts the home of the village shopkeeper Kathleen. When she reveals she has no insurance, Fr Clifford organizes a campaign to help restore her house. He gets a wrong tip on a dog race, and they are forced to resort to a poker tournament to raise the needed money.
14	8	"Chinese Whispers"	23 February 1997
Two strangers cause chaos when the villagers think they are from the revenue service. Peter struggles to control his feelings when Niamh reveals that Assumpta may leave Ballyk for Dublin.

=== Series 3 (1997–98) ===
No. overall	No. in series	Title	Original release date
15	1	"As Happy as a Turkey on Boxing Day"	21 December 1997
Everyone's Christmas plans fall apart when Padraig's son, Kevin, falls down a mine shaft. Peter is chosen by Fr Mac to entertain his nephew Timmy. Timmy ruins Peter's car.
16	2	"When a Child Is Born"	1 March 1998
With the birth of Niamh's baby approaching, Ambrose's mother arrives to help. The village is in a frenzy when it appears a holy 'miracle' may have occurred in the church, which attracts a crowd of visitors. Padraig becomes a village news reporter, and Ambrose helps Niamh deliver her baby.
17	3	"Changing Times"	8 March 1998
Brian's latest venture to attract Korean investors involves bulldozing a local beauty spot, which causes a community protest. Fr Clifford hints to Assumpta about his feelings for her, but after soul-searching, decides to remain a priest. Eamon tries to court a surprised Kathleen.
18	4	"Stardust in Your Eyes"	15 March 1998
Quigley organizes a welcoming ceremony to impress a group of potential Korean business investors, but they arrive earlier than expected, causing confusion. With Assumpta in Dublin, Niamh struggles to balance work in the pub with the demands of motherhood.
19	5	"The Fortune in Men's Eyes"	22 March 1998
When Ambrose's mother arrives to help care for baby Kieran, Quigley starts courting her, but only hoping to get her to invest in his business. Liam and Donal are laid off from work and Donal's fiancée, Sue Ellen, leaves him. The villagers report phony crimes in order to keep police headquarters from reassigning Ambrose.
20	6	"I Know When I'm Not Wanted"	29 March 1998
Assumpta returns to Ballyk with her new husband Leo, and finds Fr Clifford organizing a pub contest.
21	7	"Personal Call"	5 April 1998
Fr Mac falls ill, Assumpta's marriage deteriorates and Quigley's financial situation worsens.
22	8	"Lost Sheep"	12 April 1998
Siobhan receives unexpected news that she is pregnant. Kathleen is inexplicably horrified when Nansii MaGuire arrives in town searching for her older sister, who had lived there 20 years ago and worked for Fr Mac. Eamon's wandering sheep become a road hazard. Nansii discovers her sister was actually her mother and her father is from Ballyk; only Frank and Kathleen know she is his daughter.
23	9	"The Waiting Game"	19 April 1998
While the population of Ballykissangel is obsessed with identifying an anonymous lottery winner (who turns out to be an out-of-towner), Ambrose goes undercover to catch an infamous drug dealer in a rough nightclub in a neighbouring town.
24	10	"Pack up Your Troubles"	26 April 1998
Quigley launches a new venture.
25	11	"The Reckoning"	3 May 1998
The town is caught up in a Chinese cooking competition when circumstances finally push Peter to confess his feelings to Assumpta. Assumpta receives an electric shock and dies.
26	12	"Amongst Friends"	4 May 1998
The villagers' mood is sombre as everyone mourns the sudden death of young Assumpta. A gossip reporter interviews people about her relationship with Fr Peter. Leo returns to Ballyk and stalks Peter, eventually starting a fistfight. Peter delays his departure long enough to christen Kieran.

=== Series 4 (1998) ===
No. overall	No. in series	Title	Original release date	Viewers (millions)
27	1	"All Bar One"	20 September 1998	7.40
As Fitzgerald's pub and hotel go up for auction, many new people arrive in town, some more welcome than others. Through trickery, Brian and Niamh outbid an eager woman from out-of-town for ownership of the pub, who had planned to convert it to a fancier establishment. The town is anticipating the arrival of their new priest, a former monk.
28	2	"He Healeth the Sick"	27 September 1998	7.51
While Eamonn tries to rid his farm of invading foxes, Fr O'Connell begins working miracles on the sick. Fr Mac, however, is sceptical about the legitimacy of these miracles.
29	3	"Bread and Water"	4 October 1998	7.92
Siobhan and Brendan prepare for a water birth; Fr O'Connell and his sister Orla settle in town and find he can barely afford groceries; Sean Dillon's impetuous 16-year old daughter Emma arrives unexpectedly in Ballyk and causes tension and confusion; and Niamh moves into the pub. The village women help deliver Siobhan's baby.
30	4	"Par for the Course"	11 October 1998	7.71
A roaming stranger wanders around Ballykissangel, as Siobhan and Brendan argue over their daughter's christening. Friends finally persuade him to reconcile with her and accept his new fatherhood. Brian persuades a friend of Orla's to partner with him in buying a golf course. Emma moves in with her newly-met father, who explains to her his past and why some villagers shun them. Eamon's estranged nephew Danny from Dublin arrives, wanting him to hide a horse which authorities seek to repossess.
31	5	"The Odd Couple"	18 October 1998	7.83
Donal's new companion, a black bear, is roaming around the village wreaking havoc, while Kevin secretly starts working with Sean.
32	6	"Turf"	25 October 1998	7.00
The town is virtually deserted as everyone heads to the annual horse race where "Doctor Ryan" is in danger of losing to "Danny's Razor". Back in town, Ambrose tackles a Cilldargan drug dealer he once arrested.
33	7	"It's a Family Affair"	1 November 1998	below 6.73
Brian takes pains to organize and decorate for the grand opening of his golf course, where Micky, a flashy grand lottery winner, comes face to face with an aristocrat who had once barred him from a club membership. Numerous details go awry at the event, creating comic situations. Danny steals back his horse from Sean, and his injury from the fall worsens. Eamon secretly pays Sean for the horse.
34	8	"Rock Bottom"	8 November 1998	7.21
Padraig's life is falling apart at the seams, causing him to turn to drink for solace and escape. An ancient fertility statue is uncovered on Sean's farm, and Fitzgerald's gets satellite TV.
35	9	"As Stars Look Down"	15 November 1998	7.36
An old friend of Fr Mac's, an African priest, returns to Ballyk for a visit with news of a promotion to the Vatican, and wins the local bingo jackpot. In the meantime, Emma and Danny get stranded together in a cabin when heavy rain sets in.
36	10	"Births, Deaths and Marriages"	22 November 1998	7.88
While Siobhan and Brendan prepare for their simple and secret wedding, Emma goes round the village digging up her family's past. Eamon has an accident, and Niamh and Ambrose feel that their marriage has lost its meaning.
37	11	"It's a Man's Life"	29 November 1998	8.15
As tension between Niamh and Ambrose continues to escalate, Niamh leaves Ambrose for the day. Donal and Liam look for extra cash in golf balls that have been lost in the river, and Kathleen gets an unexpected visit from an old sweetheart.
38	12	"The Final Frontier"	6 December 1998	8.71
A massive storm sweeps over Ballykissangel and everyone runs for cover. Niamh confronts her feelings for Sean, and Ambrose confronts his marriage with Niamh.

=== Series 5 (1999) ===
No. overall	No. in series	Title	Original release date	Viewers (millions)
39	1	"Two Flew Over the Cuckoo's Nest"	26 September 1999	8.68
As Niamh and Sean come to a decision about their relationship, Brian, Orla, Liam and Donal compete in a hot air balloon race over Ballyk. Ambrose dies.
40	2	"Hello and Farewell"	3 October 1999	8.72
The accidental death of officer Ambrose has left everyone in Ballyk in tears, particularly his widow Niamh who must deal with the new changes in her life. In the meantime, Orla moves from the rectory into a new cottage hoping for some freedom.
41	3	"Catch of the Day"	10 October 1999	7.96
While Niamh, Sean and Brian try to get back to normal life, Liam and Donal stumble across a crate of expensive stolen caviar washed ashore that could cause them more harm than good.
42	4	"Moving Out"	17 October 1999	7.79
Due to the escalating tension between Emma and her father, Sean, Emma leaves home and moves in first with a young man, and then a young woman. Meanwhile, Niamh decides she must leave as well, but to Dublin. Both potential buyers for Fitzgerald's pub, back out of the purchase, but one stays to work there. Aiden, having failed to keep expense accounts, is unprepared for the church auditor.
43	5	"Eureka"	24 October 1999	9.77
It's Kieran's fourth birthday and his gran Imelda has come for a visit, creating tension with Niamh. Orla brings a famous book editor on board Connor's boat. Brian is encouraged to risk his savings for a chance to claim a stake in an Australian gold mine, but Niamh is skeptical of the offer.
44	6	"Behind Bars"	31 October 1999	8.20
As Niamh moves out of Fitzgerald's to begin her new life in Dublin, Paul Dooley, an old enemy of Brian Quigley, moves in with his wife Oonagh and their two children. Connor's attempts to arrange a romantic date for Orla go terribly wrong.
45	7	"Brendan's Crossing"	7 November 1999	7.82
Brendan applies for the position of local school headmaster, but his chances at securing the post look bleak, considering his competition and the members of the interview panel.
46	8	"A Few Dollars More"	21 November 1999	6.88
Donal's uncle Minto returns to Ballyk with a dangerous new business proposal, just in time for the arrival of the new Garda, Frankie Sullivan.
47	9	"The Outsiders"	28 November 1999	6.79
Frankie finds it hard to feel connected to the village when she orders Paul to do 50 hours of community service to make up for a crime. Brian begins to feel lonely without Niamh and Kieran.
48	10	"With a Song in My Heart"	5 December 1999	6.86
Aidan is looking for choir singers but finds it hard to rally volunteers. Sean decides to visit Niamh in Dublin.
49	11	"Love's Labours"	19 December 1999	below 6.51
Niamh and Sean announce their engagement to the village and Father Mac. Some people are supportive, while others are unsure about their decision. Donal and Liam try their luck at gambling, and Aidan organizes a raft race which has dramatic consequences.
50	12	"Arrivals and Departures"	28 December 1999	9.23
While Niamh and Sean prepare to say 'I do,' Frankie sets out to find a reckless, young driver (nearly making Aidan late for the wedding), and Paul gets a visit from a friend from prison, who tries to con him.

=== Series 6 (2001) ===
No. overall	No. in series	Title	Original release date	Viewers (millions)
51	1	"God.com"	1 March 2001	8.18
Fr Vincent Sheahan arrives in Ballyk from Australia. He quickly learns the ways of the villagers, as he deals sceptically with a new online confessional. Brian is missing a suicide note is found, when Niamh visits she receives an email, Brian is in Rio avoiding his debts.
52	2	"Drink"	4 March 2001	6.98
Fr Sheahan is arrested for drink driving. Paul sets his sights on Louis's run-down shack.
53	3	"The Cat and Daddy G."	11 March 2001	5.70
Fr Sheahan hears a confession that could be the answer to a mysterious assault. Grainne's pet goat turns out to be just what Avril's horse, The Cat, needs.
54	4	"Spirit Proof"	18 March 2001	below 6.08
Mysterious things happen around Ballyk when Paul acquires a fishing license for the pub. Kathleen wins a car and takes driving lessons from Edso.
55	5	"Paul Dooley Sleeps with the Fishes"	25 March 2001	below 5.78
Paul has a large debt to pay to Liam and Donal, and he hasn't got much time. Avril gets an unpleasant shock when her ex-husband and sister arrive in Ballyk for the weekend.
56	6	"In a Jam"	1 April 2001	below 5.57
While Siobhan waits for medical test results, the village holds its annual fête where Fr Sheahan will judge the jam competition.
57	7	"Getting Better All the Time"	8 April 2001	below 5.86
A faith healer has Doc Ryan and Fr Mac annoyed as she holds tent meetings near the village, while Paul orders Liam and Donal to move a sacred mass rock. A friend of Fr Vincent comes to the village hoping to get married in St Joseph's, despite having previously been divorced.
58	8	"Smoke Signals"	15 April 2001	below 5.43
In the final episode of Ballykissangel, Fr Mac is appalled when he learns about the wedding Fr Sheahan conducted. Paul gets a tempting offer, and Frankie's aunt is found taking cannabis from a nearby field.

== Awards and nominations ==
Award	Year	Category	Recipient	Result	Ref.
BAFTA Television Awards	1997	Best Drama Series	Ballykissangel	Nominated	
BAFTA Television Awards	1997	Craft Award for Best Original Television Music	Shaun Davey	Nominated	
BPG TV & Radio Awards	2000	Best Actor	Tony Doyle	Won	
IFTA Awards	1999	Best Leading Performance – Television	Tony Doyle	Nominated	
IFTA Awards	1999	Best Television Drama	Ballykissangel	Nominated	
IFTA Awards	2000	Best Craft Achievement – Television	David Wilson	Nominated	
IFTA Awards	2000	Best Leading Performance – Television	Tony Doyle	Nominated	
IFTA Awards	2000	Best Leading Performance – Television	Tina Kellegher	Nominated	
IFTA Awards	2000	Best Television Drama	Ballykissangel	Nominated	
National Television Awards	1996	Most Popular Actress	Dervla Kirwan	Won	
National Television Awards	1998	Most Popular Actress	Dervla Kirwan	Nominated	
National Television Awards	1998	Most Popular Actor	Stephen Tompkinson	Nominated	
National Television Awards	1998	Most Popular Drama Series	Ballykissangel	Nominated	
RTS Awards	1996	Best Tape or Film Editing – Drama	Robin Graham Scott	Nominated	
RTS Awards	1997	Best Drama Series	Ballykissangel	Won	
San Francisco International Film Festival (Silver Spire Award)	2000	Television – Drama-60 Minutes or Less	Chris Clough, Mike Cocker (episode: "He Healeth the Sick")	Nominated	

== Home media ==
All six series have been released in Region 1, 2, and 4. In 2010, four years after the release of series 5, series 6 was released on Region 2, along with a box set of series 1–6.

The ninth episode of series 3, "The Waiting Game", was omitted from early Region 2 series 3 DVDs and all the Region 4 (Australian) DVD releases. This is not the case with the 2010 box set or any Region 1 (North America) sets, all of which contain this episode.

Series	Release date		
Series	Region 1	Region 2	Region 4
Series 1	20 January 2004	15 August 2005	2 February 2006
Series 2	20 January 2004	10 October 2005	7 February 2007
Series 3	15 February 2005	20 February 2006	3 October 2007
Series 4	14 February 2006	10 April 2006	3 April 2008
Series 5	13 February 2007	12 June 2006	4 September 2008
Series 6	18 September 2007	7 June 2010	2 April 2009
Additional sets
Series 1–3	—N/a	12 June 2006	—N/a
Series 1–6	18 September 2007	7 June 2010	7 July 2011
Series 1–6 (re-issue)	—N/a	—N/a	9 August 2017

== International broadcasts ==
Repeats of the show were formerly aired every weekday on Virgin Media Three in Ireland. In the Netherlands and Flanders, ONS started broadcasting Ballykissangel in 2020.

== In other media ==
Father Peter Clifford and Assumpta Fitzgerald make a guest appearance in the 1996 Father Ted Christmas special "A Christmassy Ted", where they appear in a dream Father Ted Crilly has.

In 1997, both Father Clifford and Assumpta Fitzgerald made guest appearances in a Comic Relief edition of The Vicar of Dibley entitled "Ballykissdibley", where the lead characters from both shows participated.
