= P. J. Mara =

Irish public affairs consultant and politician (1942–2016)

Senator
- In office 12 May 1982 – 21 December 1982
- In office 10 July 1981 – 24 October 1981
- Constituency: Nominated by the Taoiseach

Personal details
- Born: Patrick James Mara; 1 February 1942 Galway, Ireland
- Died: 15 January 2016 (aged 73) Sandyford, Dublin, Ireland
- Party: Fianna Fáil
- Spouse: Breda Mara (m. 1968; died 2003)
- Domestic partner: Sheila Brogan
- Children: 2

Patrick James Mara (1 February 1942 – 15 January 2016) was an Irish public affairs consultant and politician who served as Senator from July 1981 to October 1981 and May 1982 to December 1982. He was most renowned for being the political adviser to former Taoiseach Charles Haughey. He also served as Press Secretary to Fianna Fáil from 1983 to 1987 and Government Press Secretary from 1987 to 1992.

He was appointed the Fianna Fáil Director of Elections for the 1997, 2002, and 2007 general elections. He was a member of the board of Digicel, the company founded by Denis O'Brien to build mobile networks in the Caribbean.

He was regularly lampooned on the satirical Raidió Teilifís Éireann (RTÉ) radio sketch show Scrap Saturday, which ran from 1989 to 1991.

== Early life ==
Mara was born in Galway, but was raised in Millmount Avenue in Drumcondra, Dublin. He was educated at O'Connell's Richmond Street, and at Coláiste Mhuire, an Irish-language Christian Brothers secondary school (Gaelscoil) on Parnell Square. Mara's father, a Garda, died when Mara was still in school. He was raised by his mother and sister. After school, Mara worked at Boland's Mill for a short time. After a few more jobs, he started working in the textiles industry.

== Earlier career ==
Mara started becoming actively involved in politics in his late 20s, having come from a family background of support for Fianna Fáil. He unsuccessfully ran for public office multiple times.

Mara began to show interest in the career of Charles Haughey in 1970, during the Arms Trial, and began a professional relationship with him, eventually becoming his right hand man and confidante. Haughey and Mara at the time would travel around Ireland visiting local branches of Fianna Fáil. Mara assisted Haughey with strategy during election campaigns. His attempts at a non-political entrepreneurial career were sidelined by his political aspirations, including his carpet sales business, which failed.

When Haughey came back from the political wilderness in the late 1970s, Mara helped to secure support for him in the 1979 leadership election of the party. In his first government, Haughey appointed Mara as a senator.

In 1982, despite having no previous experience in public relations, Mara was appointed press secretary for Fianna Fáil by Haughey. He made innovations in how to operate public relations for the party, including holding opposition press briefings. He also tried to increase the electability of Haughey, particularly among young people.

Mara adopted techniques of electioneering from US politics for the campaign for the 1987 Irish general election. He devised a strategy for the election by consulting with a broad range of people, to aid re-election. When the party went back into government in 1987 with Haughey as Taoiseach, Mara served as the press secretary for the new government, and until the resignation of Haughey. He did not work with Albert Reynolds in government.

== Flood Tribunal ==
Mara was one of the components of the so-called Century Radio module at the Flood Tribunal. Mara told the Tribunal that during the course of his employment as a Press Secretary, his financial remuneration was not sufficient to meet his immediate financial requirements, and he experienced financial difficulties. He said he received assistance from his friends, Oliver Barry and financier Dermot Desmond, in the form of loans. However, there was no interest charge, nor was there any fixed schedule for repayment. Those making the loans did not intend that the sums advanced would be treated as gifts by Mara, but were content to receive their money back, once Mara was in a position so to do. Desmond told the Tribunal that he had lent £46,000 to Mara between 1986 and 1989. Barry said he remembered lending Mara a sum of £2,000 on one occasion between 1982 and 1984.

In the Second Interim Report of the Flood Tribunal, Judge Feargus Flood found that Mara failed to co-operate with the Tribunal by: "Failing to provide the Tribunal with details of an account in the name of Pullman Limited, operated by him at Royal Bank of Scotland in the Isle of Man, when swearing his Affidavit of Discovery made pursuant to an Order of the Tribunal requiring him to discover, inter alia, any such account."

== Later career ==
Mara was the director of elections for Fianna Fáil when Bertie Ahern was leader, which included managing the campaigns for the party in the general elections in 1997, 2002, and 2007.

Starting in the 1990s, Mara began working as a public relations consultant for many prominent Irish businessmen. He worked closely with Denis O'Brien in the later stages of his life.

== Personal life ==
Mara married Breda Brogan from Kinvara, County Galway, who was a model and later an entrepreneur, setting up a clothing wholesales company which was later bought out by Penney's. They had one son, John. Breda died in 2003. With his partner Sheila, Mara had a daughter, Elena, born in 2013. Mara pursued unsuccessful business ventures, which included selling carpets. While Mara was wealthy in his earlier career before politics, and during it, at one point after he could not even get the credit to buy a used car.

He lived at number 19 Wellington Road in Ballsbridge, Dublin.

== Death ==
Mara died at the Beacon Hospital after a long illness on 15 January 2016 at the age of 73. He died without a will, leaving an estate of €1,593,213. He was buried in Kinvara, County Galway.

== Sources ==
"PJ Mara: A Legacy". Legacy. Series 2. Episode 2. 16 May 2016. RTÉ.
