= Mark Thomas (composer) =

British composer (1956 – 2023)

- Born: 9 April 1956; Penclawdd, Wales, UK
- Died: 19 July 2023 (aged 67) Swansea, Wales, UK
- Occupation: Composer
- Years active: 1976–2023

Mark Thomas (9 April 1956 – 19 July 2023) was a British composer. He is known for his work on Twin Town (1997), The Final Curtain (2002), Agent Cody Banks 2: Destination London (2004) and The Magic Roundabout (2005), and doing the theme and music for the animated children's television series Shaun the Sheep. He won a 1998 BAFTA Cymru award for his score to Twin Town. His music for TV series Episodes gained him a nomination for the 2011 Primetime Emmy Award for Outstanding Original Main Title Theme Music.

== Early life ==
Thomas was born in 1956 in Penclawdd on the Gower Peninsula. He attended Gowerton Grammar School, and studied music composition and orchestration at university. Thomas began his career as a violinist, playing in orchestras for major composers like John Williams, Jerry Goldsmith, and John Barry. He was also part of the original orchestra for Andrew Lloyd Webber's The Phantom of the Opera on its opening night in 1986. He transitioned to composing for films and television in the early 1990s, quickly becoming a highly sought-after composer in the British industry. Known for his versatility and collaborative nature, Thomas took pride in supporting Welsh cinema and television projects, until his death on 19 July 2023, at the age of 67 after a long illness.
