= 1985 in Irish television =

The following is a list of events relating to television in Ireland from 1985.

== Events ==
- March – Vincent Finn is appointed Director-General of RTÉ.
- 25 July – RTÉ 2 picks up the last British sitcom to star Leonard Rossiter, Tripper's Day.
- 16 November – US action adventure series MacGyver premieres on RTÉ 1, two months after its first television airing in its homeland.
- 24 December – The Riordans is broadcast for the final time on RTÉ Radio. The programme had switched from television to radio in 1979.
- Undated – The Late Late Show attracts controversy following an interview with a pair of lesbian former nuns. The edition leads to protesters picketing the studio with hymns and rosary beads after a High Court case during which there are calls for the chat show to be outlawed over fears it will "greatly undermine Christian moral values" and "the respect of the general public for nuns".
- Undated – 1985 is believed to be the airdate of Nova TV, a pirate television station in Dublin.
- Undated – The popular Irish children's television puppet character Bosco returns to television with a brand new animated 5 minute series. The series features the character living in a house in the country (rather than inside a box like the original live-action series) and introduces new characters such as the three bears, Pat and Paul (two mischievous children who wear mushrooms as hats), Captain Buccaneer the firefighter (who wears a firefighter's bucket as a hat) and the haughty Duchess. Paula Lambert Bosco's current puppeteer reprises her role as Bosco by providing the voice whilst former presenters of the live-action series Marian Richardson and Frank Twomey provided the voices of all the other female and male characters.

== Debuts ==
=== RTÉ 1 ===
- 8 January – (United States) Shirt Tales (1982–1983)
- 1 February – (United States) Benji, Zax & the Alien Prince (1983)
- 26 June – (France) / (Japan) Ulysses 31 (1981–1982)
- 19 July – (United Kingdom) Goodbye, Mr. Chips (1984)
- 28 August – (United Kingdom) Ever Decreasing Circles (1984–1989)
- 26 September – (United States) Alvin and the Chipmunks (Ruby Spears version) (1983–1987)
- 30 September – (United Kingdom) Children's Island (1985)
- 1 October – (United Kingdom) The Wind in the Willows (1983–1990)
- 4 October – (United States) Casper and the Angels (1979)
- 16 November – (United States) MacGyver (1985–1992)
- 2 December – (United Kingdom) Super Gran (1985–1987)
- Undated – Bosco: The Animated Series (1985)
- Undated - (United States) Cover Up (1984-1985)

=== RTÉ 2 ===
- 7 January – (United States) Monchhichis (1983)
- 17 July – (United States) Pitfall! (1983)
- 25 July – (United Kingdom) Tripper's Day (1984)
- 4 September – (United Kingdom) Cockleshell Bay (1980–1986)
- 19 October – (United States) He-Man and the Masters of the Universe (1983–1985)
- Undated – (United Kingdom) Dempsey and Makepeace (1985–1986)

== Ongoing television programmes ==
=== 1960s ===
- RTÉ News: Nine O'Clock (1961–present)
- RTÉ News: Six One (1962–present)
- The Late Late Show (1962–present)

=== 1970s ===
- Sports Stadium (1973–1997)
- The Late Late Toy Show (1975–present)
- RTÉ News on Two (1978–2014)
- Bosco (1979–1996)
- The Sunday Game (1979–present)

=== 1980s ===
- Today Tonight (1982–1992)
- Mailbag (1982–1996)
- Glenroe (1983–2001)
- Davis at Large (1984–1986)
- Leave It To Mrs O'Brien (1984–1986)
- MT-USA (1984–1987)

== Networks and services ==
=== Launches ===
Network	Type	Launch date	Notes	Source
Bravo	Cable television	20 December		

== Ending this year ==
- Undated – Trom agus Éadrom (1975–1985)
- Undated – The Irish R.M. (1983–1985)

== Births ==
- 20 September – George McMahon, actor

== See also ==
- 1985 in Ireland
