= Paula Lambert (puppeteer) =

Irish puppeteer

- Born: Ireland
- Occupation: Puppeteer
- Known for: Her puppetry, Bosco

Paula Lambert is an Irish puppeteer, most famously she is the puppeteer of Bosco. She was a member of the Lambert Puppet Theatre in Monkstown, Dublin.

== Biography ==
Paula Lambert is the youngest daughter of puppeteers Eugene and Mai Lambert, one of the couple's ten children. From childhood, Lambert was a puppeteer with the family's Lambert Puppet Theatre, which was founded in 1972, and on their first television show, Wanderly Wagon. On the Wanderly Wagon Lambert was one of the mice who lived in the wallpaper and later one of the squirrels who lived in the loft. She was also on the spin-off series Fortycoats & Co. as Spooky the Cat.

Lambert took over from her sister Miriam as the puppeteer and voice of Bosco in 1981. After the cancellation of the television show, Lambert continued to tour Bosco around Ireland with the Paula Lambert Puppet Theatre. 2019 marked 40 years of Lambert's Bosco tours.

Lambert was in a relationship with Michael Monaghan, a former RTÉ producer and director, until his death in 2009. They have one child, Johnny. Johnny has joined the Paula Lambert Puppet Theatre as a third generation puppeteer.
