= Martin Duffy (filmmaker) =

Irish filmmaker and writer

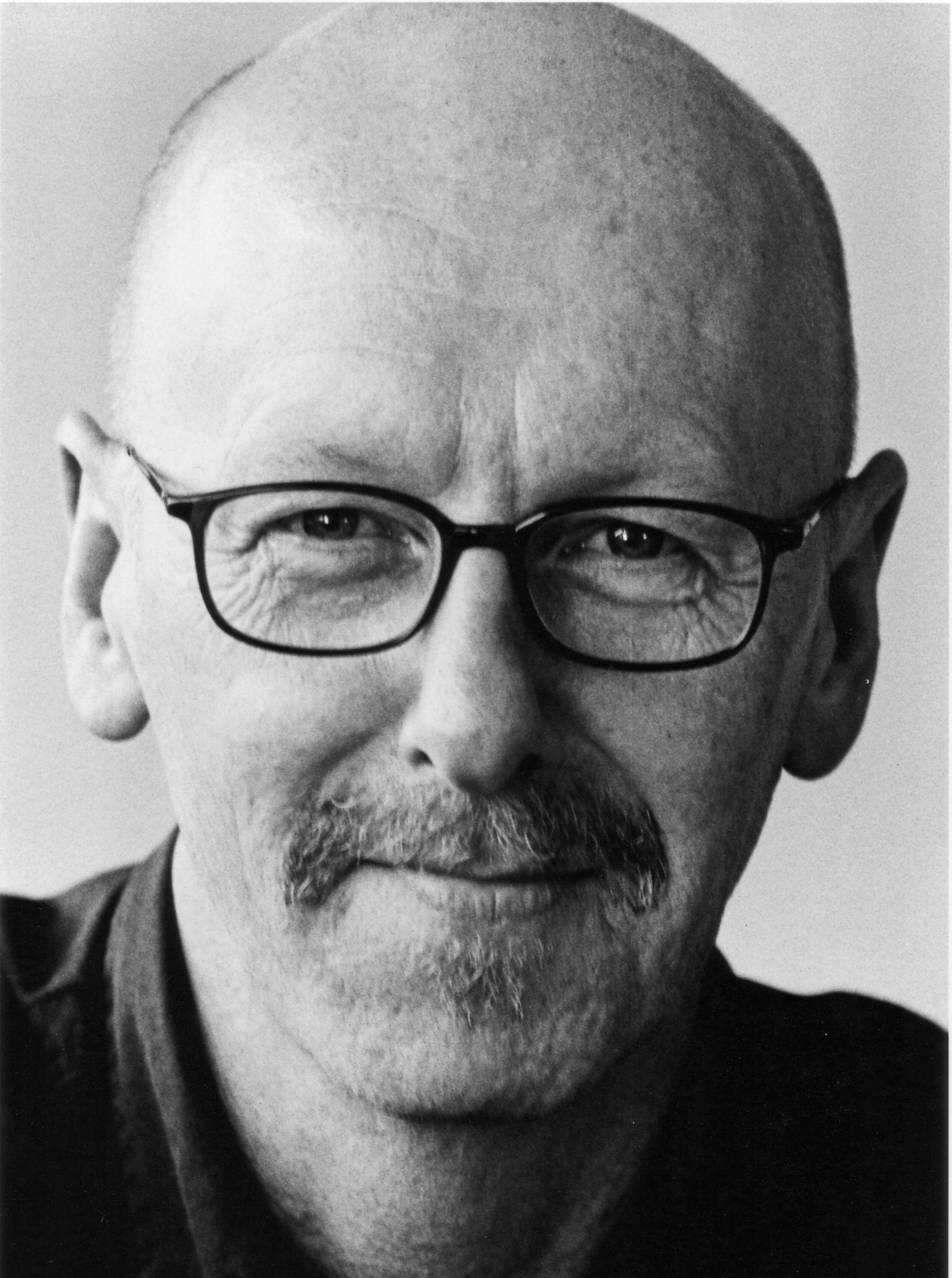
- Martin Duffy, portrait © Jens Winter
- Born: 25 August 1952 (age 73); Dublin, Ireland
- Occupations: Film director Screenwriter; Film editor
- Years active: As director/screenwriter: 1996 - present
- Website: http://duffyberlin.com/

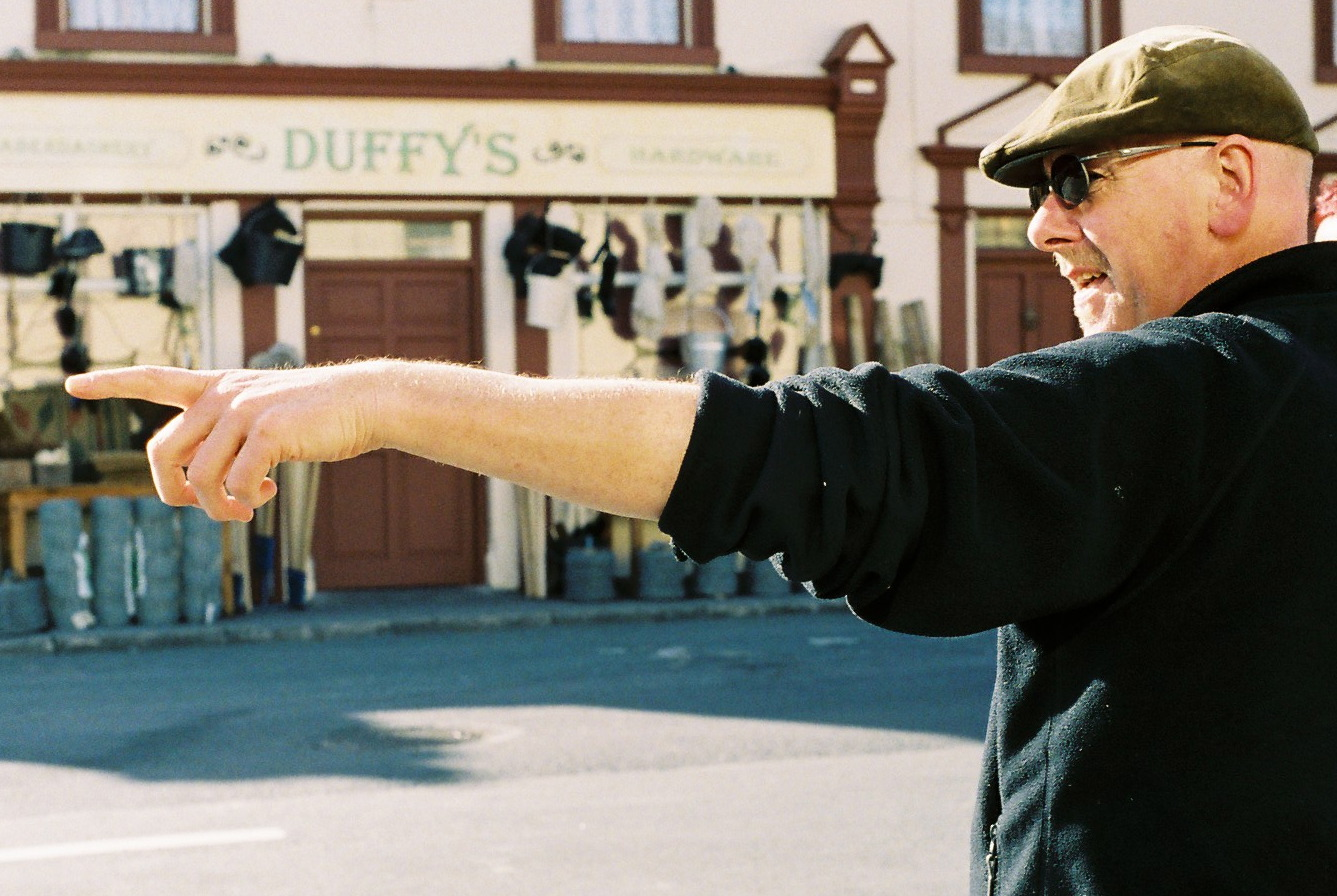
Martin Duffy filming © Jens Winter

Martin Duffy (born 25 August 1952 in Dublin) is an Irish filmmaker and writer.

Starting as a film-editor at Radio Telefís Éireann in the late 1970s, he expanded into writing children's shows in the 1980s with the Lambert Puppet Theatre, Wanderly Wagon, Fortycoats & Co., Bosco and Scratch Saturday. He left Irish national television in 1989 to become a freelance editor and in 1995 found funding for his first feature film, The Boy from Mercury, a film set in 1950s Dublin about a young boy whose life revolves around the escapism of Saturday afternoon Flash Gordon serials at his local cinema. The film received international critical acclaim and several awards, but was a commercial dud. Martins book about the making of the film, The Road to Mercury, is an insightful look into the mechanisms of the Irish film industry.

He has since directed three feature films, continuing to work with young actors and creating family films, The Bumblebee Flies Anyway, starring Elijah Wood, The Testimony of Taliesin Jones and Summer of the Flying Saucer, a family film about a UFO that crashlanded in rural Ireland in 1967. He continues to work as a freelance editor when he is not directing, and has written several books for children, as well as a travelogue and a family history. He now resides in Berlin, Germany.

== Selected filmography ==
- Summer of the Flying Saucer (2008)
- The Testimony of Taliesin Jones (2000)
- The Bumblebee Flies Anyway (1999)
- The Boy from Mercury (1996)

== Selected television work ==
- Bosco (Writer)
- Fortycoats & Co. (Writer)
- Wanderly Wagon (Writer)
- The Dubliners Dublin (Writer)

== Selected writings ==
- Barney and Molly: A True Dublin Love Story (2006)
- The Road to Mercury (1996/2006)
