= Jody Latham =

English actor

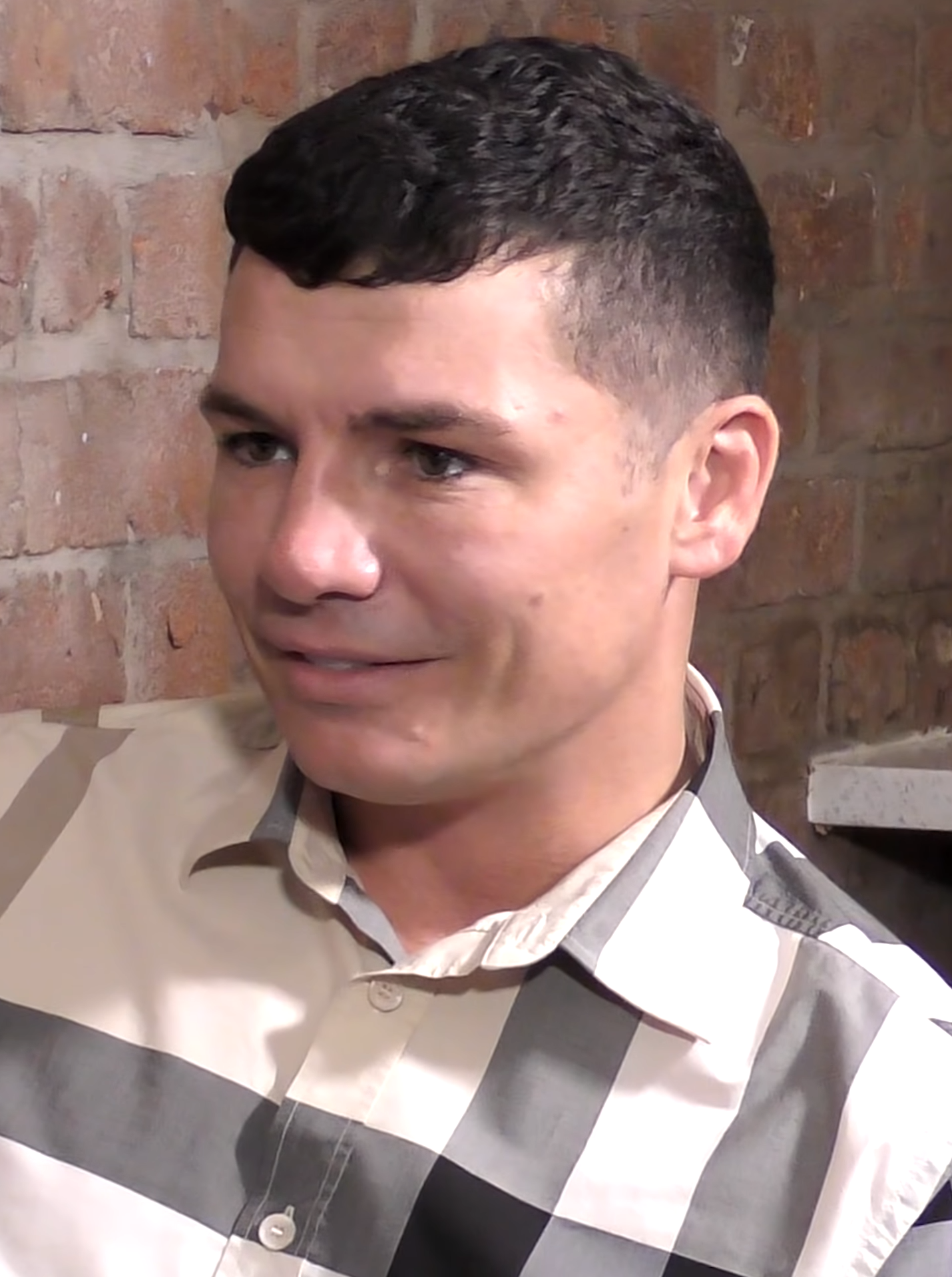
- Latham in 2020
- Born: Jody Lee Latham; 9 January 1983 (age 43); Burnley, Lancashire, England
- Occupation: Actor
- Years active: 1998–2017
- Children: 2

Jody Lee Latham (born 9 January 1983) is an English actor, known for playing Lip Gallagher in the British Channel 4 comedy-drama series Shameless, Calum McKenzie in the ITV drama series The Fixer, Rob Grayson in the BBC One soap opera EastEnders, Liam Clarke in Coronation Street and Hollyoaks as Shane. He has also had notable short-term guest roles in the school-based drama series Waterloo Road and the medical drama Holby City.

== Early life ==
Latham attended Walton High School in Nelson though was expelled. Growing up, Latham attended Burnley Youth Theatre, where he was noticed at age 12, which resulted in his acting career taking off.

He experienced a difficult childhood, having witnessed his mother being physically abused by a former boyfriend, though subsequently found stability when his mother began a relationship with his future stepfather, whom he refers to as his "dad".

== Career ==
=== 1998–2007: Shameless, The Street and Ruby Blue ===
In 1998, Latham made his television debut in an episode of The Cops as Grant, and went on to appear, in 2000, as Nelson Catchpole in the series Big Meg, Little Meg. He played Lee, one of the key characters in When I Was 12 in 2001. Latham has appeared in five BAFTA winning dramas: Clocking Off, The Cops, The Street, Shameless and EastEnders.

Latham played a leading role in the BBC drama Mr Harvey Lights a Candle, which was shown in March 2005. He also appeared in an episode of The Street, written by Jimmy McGovern, in April 2006.

Latham worked regularly in television before being cast as Lip Gallagher in Shameless, the second eldest of the Gallagher children. Lip is an intelligent and outspoken youth who is trying to escape from the Chatsworth estate in Stretford. He was 24 when he left the show. He took on other work between series, until he was written out of the show in 2008 to allow him to concentrate on other projects. He later returned to the role for the series finale in early 2013.

In 2006, Latham filmed a short film, A Neutral Corner, about a young boxer arriving in a desolate town where he meets a dog, a stranger and a mysterious waitress. In 2007 he appeared in Ruby Blue with Bob Hoskins—Latham's first film role.

=== 2008–2013: The Fixer, The Tudors and Hell's Kitchen ===
In 2008, Latham starred in ITV1's The Fixer, playing the cheeky scally character Calum, and played a part in the music video Moonshine & Roses by International One. He also appeared in Tulisa's 2012 music video for song "Sight of You".

Latham has also turned presenter - hosting the NME Awards aftershow party interviewing award winners. He also been the face and voice of numerous brands including Clearasil, Orange Mobile, Gio Goi and many more, including the BBC flagship station Radio 1.

He appears in the films Act of Grace (which he is also associate producer) and The Michael Gomez Story (2007). In the latter he plays Michael Gomez, an Irish Traveller who turned professional boxer at 17.

Latham played in two episodes in the drama The Tudors along with Jonathan Rhys Meyers.

Latham was one of the celebrities to take part in the 2009 series of Hell's Kitchen on ITV1.

In 2010, Latham played Matt on the radio series House on Fire which aired on BBC Radio 4 from 2010 to 2013.

In 2011, Latham joined the cast of the BBC soap opera EastEnders, playing Rob Grayson, a pimp in a controversial sex exploitation storyline.

In 2013, Latham appeared in the popular BBC school-based drama series, Waterloo Road as Steve-O Malone.

=== 2015–present: Epitique ===
In 2015, Latham set up his own company, Epitique, which sold botox and dermal fillers, with Latham training to be able to administer the product.

== Filmography ==
Year	Title	Role	Notes
1998	The Cops	Grant	Series 1: Episode 7
1999–2000	The Cops	Craig Davenport	5 episodes
2000	Big Meg, Little Meg	Nelson Catchpole	Unknown episodes
2000	Coronation Street	Liam Clarke	Episode 4923
2000	Heartbeat	Paul Dugdale	Episode: "Cold Turkey"
2001	When I Was 12	Lee	Television film
2002	Clocking Off	Paul Talbot	Episode: "Mark's Story"
2002	Having It Off	Skidder	Unknown episodes
2002	The Stretford Wives	Crabby	Television film
2002–2003	Holby City	Alan Bridger	6 episodes
2003	Doctors	James Byers	Episode: "Preservation"
2003	In Deep	Dominic	Episode: "Character Assassins: Parts 1 & 2"
2004–2008, 2013	Shameless	Lip Gallagher	Regular role; 37 episodes
2005	Mr. Harvey Lights a Candle	Andy Wilson	Television film
2006	The Street	Billy Roberts	Episodes: "The Flasher" and "Football"
2006	A Neutral Corner	Graham Brien	Short film
2007	The Michael Gomez Story	Michael Gomez	Film
2007	Ruby Blue	Ian	Film
2008–2009	The Fixer	Calum McKenzie	All 12 episodes
2008	Act of Grace	Joey	Film
2008	Spooks: Code 9	Dylan	Series 1: Episode 3
2010	The Tudors	Harry Hurst	2 episodes
2010	The Silence	Roach	Miniseries; 3 episodes
2010	Jacob	Bobby	Short film
2010	Casualty	Mikey Sandy	Episode: "Winter Wonderland"
2011	EastEnders	Rob Grayson	Recurring role; 9 episodes
2012	Casualty	Nathan Jones	Episode: "I'll See You in My Dreams"
2012	Monroe	Paul Herd	Series 2: Episode 1
2013	Waterloo Road	Steve-O Malone	4 episodes
2014	Celluloid	Barnsey	Film
2014	3 in a Bed	Jase	Film
2014	Hollyoaks	Shane	4 episodes
2014	The Last Hand	Ace	Short film
2015	Suspects	Olivder Hemingway	Episode: "Connections"
2015	Mirrors	Luke	Short film; segment Boys on Film 13: Trick & Treat
2015	Inspector George Gently	Jonjo Burdon	Episode: "Son of a Gun"
2015	Doctors	Ray Wilkins	Episode: "Sensitive Skin"
2015	Holby City	Jed Martinez	5 episodes
2016	Broken Glass	Luke	Short film
2016	Kill Pill	DJ Munta	Short film
2017	No Offence	Aidan McGee	3 episodes
