= Fortycoats & Co. =

Children's TV show in Ireland

- Genre: Children's drama series
- Based on: Wanderly Wagon
- Written by: Carolyn Swift
- Starring: Fran Dempsey; Virginia Cole; Conal Kearney; Laurie Morton; Des Nealon; Robert Carrickford
- Country of origin: Ireland
- Original language: English

Production
- Production location: Ireland

Original release
- Network: RTÉ One
- Release: 7 January 1983

Fortycoats & Co. was an Irish children's television drama series produced by RTÉ and broadcast on RTÉ One during the 1980s.

== Plot ==
The show featured the adventures of the title character Fortycoats (Fran Dempsey) - his catchphrase was "By me forty coats and me fifty pockets" - and his companions Sofar Sogood (played by Conal Kearney), a prim goody two shoes character and Slightly Bonkers (played by Virginia Cole), a naive schoolgirl. They occupied the Flying Trick Shop (also known as the Flying Tuck Shop and the Flying Sweet Shop) and battled against the evil Wilhelmina, the Whirligig Witch (and her cat, Spooky) and the equally evil Pickarooney (who lived in a rubbish tip and kidnapped children).

== Cast ==
=== Main cast ===
- Fran Dempsey as Fortycoats
- Virginia Cole as Slightly Bonkers
- Conal Kearney as Sofar Sogood

=== Guest cast ===
- Laurie Morton as Wilhelmina, The Whirligig Witch
- Des Nealon as The Pickarooney
- Robert Carrickford as The Count
- Noel McGee as Timothy Tumbledown
- Maria McDermottroe as The Lilter
- Derry Power as Tony the Tailor
- Fiona MacGinty as Queen Roola Boola
- Vincent Smith as Utterly Bonkers
- Annie Kilmartin as Totally Bonkers
- Barbara McNamara as The Princess
- Gerry O'Brien as Sir Dashing the Bold

=== Voice actors ===
- Paula Lambert as Spooky the Cat
- Davy Byrne as Demented Chicken

== Production ==
=== Origins of Fortycoats ===
The name Johnny Fortycoats first appears in Dublin folklore in the 1930s. Although generally taken to be the nickname of a man called Patrick Marlow, it may perhaps have been applied to more than one person, including one of a couple of tramps who walked the coast of Dublin at the time of the television series. It was his habit to wear several coats, hence the nickname.

=== Wanderly Wagon ===
The show was a spin-off from Wanderly Wagon, in which Fortycoats was played by Bill Golding, who also played Rory. The in joke of the programme was that Fortycoats only ever visited in his flying sweetshop when Rory had gone off on some errand and Rory seemed to doubt Fortycoats existence because he never met him. When Golding left the series, Fran Dempsey took over the heavily disguised role of Fortycoats but not that of Rory, who was written out. Eugene Lambert (creator of Wanderly Wagon) said he had no involvement with the spin-off and described it as "a rehash of our programme".
