= Miriam Lambert (puppeteer) =

Irish puppeteer

- Born: Dublin, Ireland
- Known for: Puppeteering

Miriam Lambert is an Irish puppeteer, the original puppeteer of the television programme Bosco. She was a member of the family's Lambert Puppet Theatre in Monkstown, Dublin.

== Biography ==
Lambert was born in Dublin to Eugene and Mai Lambert, both famous Irish puppeteers known for creating the Lambert Puppet Theatre in 1972. She grew up in Finglas. Lambert was involved in the theatre with them, and appeared in various television programmes. She began aged eight as the little witch Bábóg in the children's television puppet programme Murphy agus a Chairde during the mid-1960s. Lambert went on to perform as many characters on Wanderly Wagon but particularly 'The Squirrels'. She performed as the puppeteer and voice of Bosco until 1981 when her sister Paula took over from her.

Lambert left Ireland, spending several years living in the Netherlands before returning home. She is one of the founders of The Annual International Puppet Festival Dublin and was married to Trevor Scott. After his death, Lambert moved to Thomastown, Kilkenny where she began a solo career and runs her own puppeteering company which has taken her all over the world.
