= Jens Winter =

German film and theatre actor of British descent (born 1965)

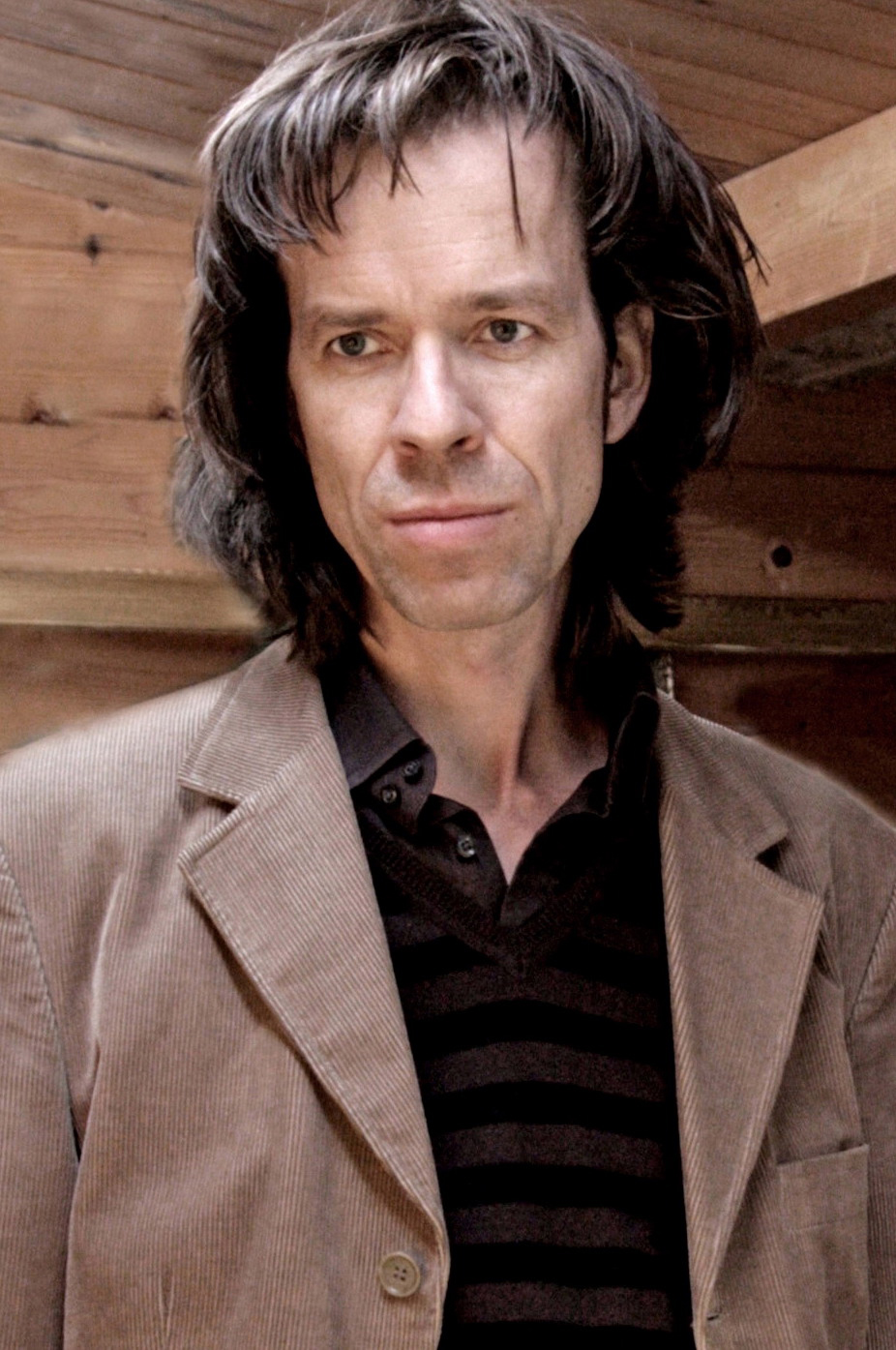
Jens Winter © Jens Winter

Jens Winter (born May 26, 1965) is a German film and theatre actor of British descent. He has resided in Berlin, Germany since 1987 and performs in German and English language productions.

His works include German features, TV films and series as well as Irish and American productions, such as the Science Fiction feature Summer of the Flying Saucer directed by Irish filmmaker Martin Duffy. In 2008 it was selected as the opening film of CineMagic film festival Dublin. The short film Jonah And The Vicarious Nature Of Homesickness by British-Australian film maker Bryn Chainey in which he plays the lead Jonah is the winner of the Berlin Today Award 2010 of Berlinale Talent Campus. For the Generation section of the Berlinale film festival Jens Winter does German live voice overs since 2001.

== Acting education ==
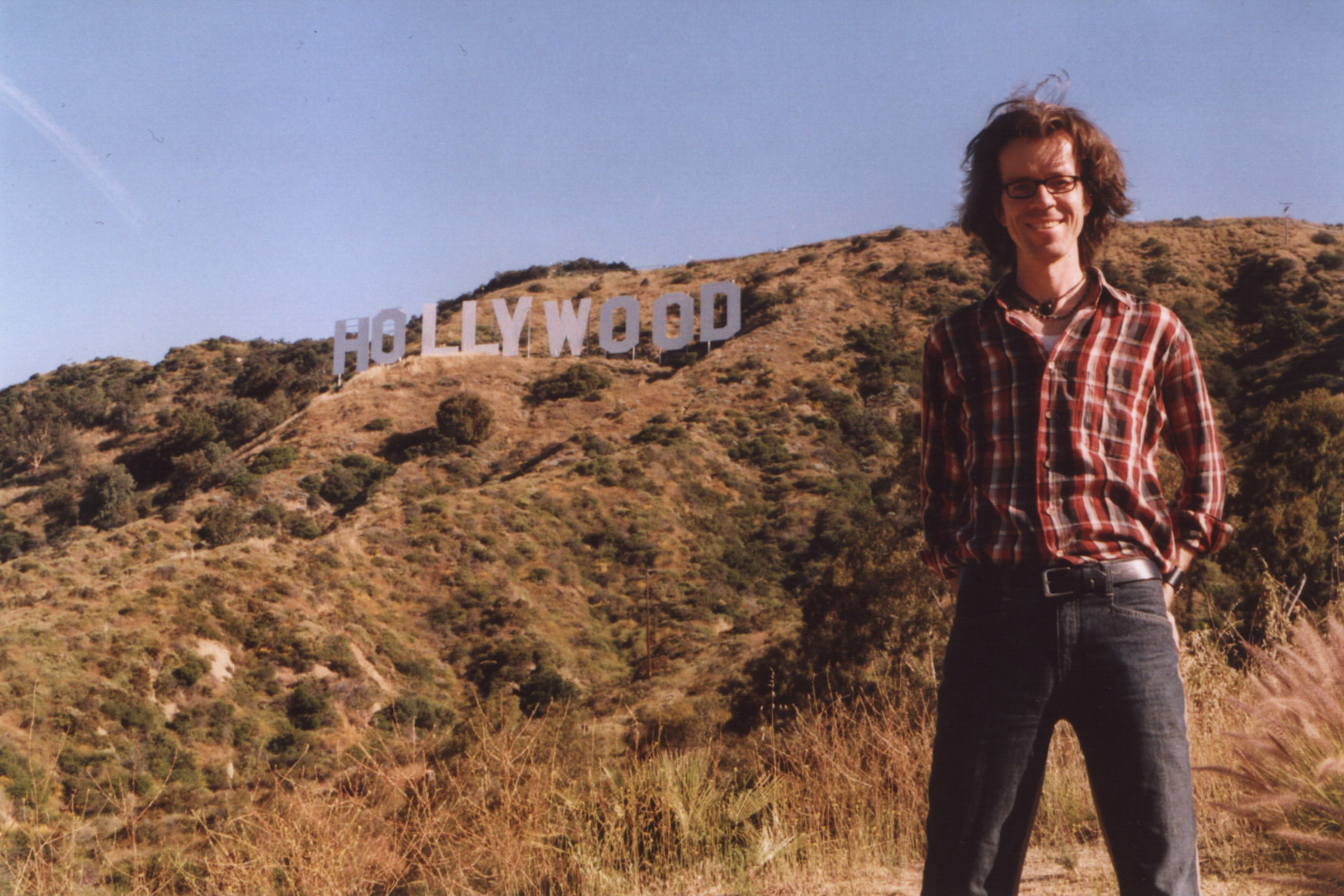
Jens Winter in LA 2005

- 1995-1998 drama school and state-certified exam in Berlin
- 2002 master class film acting, German acting and media academie DSA, Berlin
- 2004 International Film Actors Training - The Studio, Los Angeles

== Features ==
- 2008 Summer of the Flying Saucer (English language) | director: Martin Duffy | role: The Tall Man Jimi
- 2005 Schöner Leben | director: Markus Herling | role: Gerd
- 2003 Luther (English language) | director: Eric Till | role: Fugger auditor

== Selected television works ==
- 2009 Jonah And The Vicarious Nature Of Homesickness | director: Bryn Chainey | role: Jonah | Winner of the Berlin Today Award 2010 of Berlinale Talent Campus
- 2007 Unschuldig | director: Benjamin Quabeck | role: Dirk Antes Pro7
- 2007 Die Stein | director: Karola Hattop | role: Reiner Rieplos ARD
- 2005-2003 Der Landarzt | director: Gunter Krää, Torsten Löhn | role: Urs Jakob ZDF
- 2005 The Chittendens (English language) | director: Cathrine Sullivan | role: Rich Chittenden
- 2004 Im Namen des Gesetzes | director: Florian Froschmayr | role: Meißner RTL
- 2004 Flying (English language) | director: Kathy Cavanaugh | role: daddy (short feature)

== Theatre and dance ==
Prior to his acting education Jens Winter studied the basic techniques of Butoh dance with the Japanese choreographers Yumiko Yoshioka and Minako Seki and performed in four Berlin productions of theirs. (The Last Wedding / The Last Supper / The Trip To China In Dreams / Night On A Bare Mountain).

With the Austrian director Ingrid Hammer he played and danced in "REM Phase 3" and "REM Phase IV", two plays featuring night dreams.

Jens Winter performed in "stop and go" - a dance-theatre night" which he co-directed and created in collaboration with choreographers and contemporary dancers Tamara Brücken and Anna Widmer. "stop and go" premiered at the German Freilichtspiele Schwäbisch Hall theatre festival in 2006.

== Selected plays ==
- 2009 Tod Couture | director: Anke Reitzenstein | role: Gregor Schroeder | Die Auftakter, Berlin
- 2008 Gelee Royale | director: Anke Reitzenstein | role: Rolf Wawraczek | Die Auftakter, Berlin
- 2007 Opera Mortale | director: Anke Reitzenstein | role: Hajo von Boysenberry | Die Auftakter, Berlin
- 2006 stop and go | director: Tamara Brücken, Anna Widmer, Jens Winter | role: the man | Freilichtspiele Schwäbisch Hall
- 2005 Schwarzer Sonntag | director: Anke Reitzenstein | role: Rainer Pritzko | Auftakter Berlin
- 2004 REM Phase IV | director: Ingrid Hammer | role: Jürgen | Theater Zerbrochene Fenster Berlin
- 2004 Bloomsday-Night Town | director: Anna Zimmer | role: Stephen Daedalus | Kunsthaus Tacheles Berlin
- 2004 The Audimax Manifestation (English language) | director: Cathrine Sullivan | role: Dr. Nerd | guest performance at Volksbühne Berlin
- 2002 Rem Phase 3 | director: Ingrid Hammer | role: Jürgen | Theater zum westlichen Stadthirschen Berlin
- 2001-1999 engagement at Theater Windspiel Berlin, artistic director: Niksa Eterovic | plays: Mirandolina / Cafe der Intuition (English language) / Schlangenhemd des Windes / "?" / VEB Horch & Guck / Ein Fremder, was ist das? (English language) / Ulysses-Chapter 1 / Ein Tisch muss her
- 1998 Krach in Chiozza | director: Valentin Platareanu | role: Paron Fortunato | Theater Charlotte, Berlin; Gemeindehalle Mietingen
- 1998 Der Stern ohne Namen | director: Valentin Platareanu | role: Prof. Miroiu | Werkstatt der Kulturen, Berlin
- 1997 Der Schub | director: Valentin Platareanu | role: Dr Pätau / Pit | guest performance at Renaissance Theater Berlin

== Notes ==
=== German newspaper articles ===
- Märkische Allgemeine, 14. März 1997, "Nicht Mitleid, Verständnis - Der Schub", by Gerold Paul
- Südwestpresse, 10.11.1998, "Komödie im Milieu der Fischer - Krach in Chiozza", by Wolfgang Manecke
- Berliner Morgenpost, 18. November 1998, "Spaghetti alla Mirandolina", by Josef Keller
- Neues Deutschland, 1.Dezember 1998, "Mirandolina empfängt", by Sonja Patzschke
- Berliner Zeitung, 26. März 1999, "Couchtisch mit Kurbel - Ein Tisch muss her", by Irene Bazinger
- Berliner Morgenpost, 19.12.2004, "Tanzträume in fremden Betten - REM Phase IV", by cok
- Haller Tagblatt, 10.August 2006, "Von Bewegungen und Begegnungen - stop and go", by Bettina Lober
