= Ian Bannen =

Scottish actor (1928–1999)

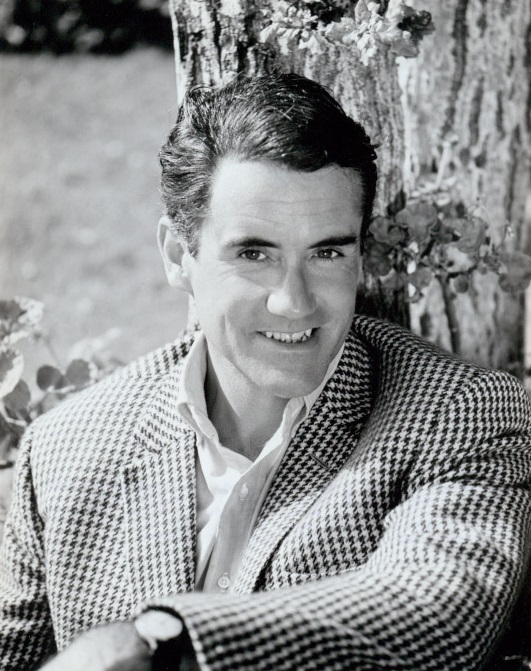
- Bannen in 1966
- Born: Ian Edmund Bannen; 29 June 1928; Airdrie, Lanarkshire, Scotland
- Died: 3 November 1999 (aged 71); Knockies Straight (near Loch Ness), Scotland
- Resting place: Kilchuimen Burial Ground, Fort Augustus, Scotland
- Occupation: Actor
- Years active: 1951–1999
- Spouse: Marilyn Salisbury (m. 1978)
- Awards: See below

Ian Edmund Bannen (29 June 1928 – 3 November 1999) was a Scottish stage and screen actor. He was nominated for an Academy Award for Best Supporting Actor for his performance in The Flight of the Phoenix (1965), the first Scots actor to receive the honour. He was also nominated for a BAFTA Award for his performance in Sidney Lumet's The Offence (1973) and John Boorman's Hope and Glory (1987).

On stage, Bannen was an original member of the Royal Shakespeare Company and renowned for his interpretations of William Shakespeare and Eugene O'Neill. He won the 1981 Critics' Circle Theatre Award for Best Supporting Actor for his performance in Brian Friel's Translations. He received BAFTA Scotland's Lifetime Achievement Award in 1996.

== Early life and education ==
Bannen was born in Airdrie, Lanarkshire, the son of lawyer John James Bannen (died 1958), of Coatbridge, Lanarkshire, and Agnes Clare (née Galloway). His family was Roman Catholic.

After attending St Aloysius' College, Glasgow and Ratcliffe College, Leicestershire, Bannen served in Egypt as a corporal in the British Army. He studied acting at the Gate Theatre in Dublin, where he made his stage debut in a 1947 production of Armlet of Jade.

== Career ==
=== Theatre ===
Bannen became a successful figure on the London stage, making a name for himself in the plays of both Shakespeare and Eugene O'Neill. He was an original member of the Royal Shakespeare Company and played leading roles in productions of Othello, Hamlet, and As You Like It.

Aside from his Shakespearean roles, Bannen was also well known for his interpretations of Eugene O'Neill's dramas. He played Hickey in the original 1958 West End production of The Iceman Cometh and James (Jamie) Tyrone Jr. in Long Day's Journey into Night (opposite Alan Bates and Anthony Quayle) the same year. Over 20 years later, he reprised the role in O'Neill's sequel A Moon for the Misbegotten, first on the West End and then in the 1984 Broadway revival. He also played Cornelius Melody in a 1962 staging of A Touch of the Poet, first in Dublin and then in Venice.

He starred in the West End debut of Brian Friel's play Translations, which earned him a Critics' Circle Theatre Award for Best Supporting Actor in 1981. The same year, he played Jesus Christ in Thine is the Kingdom, a passion play staged at the Liverpool Metropolitan Cathedral. His other notable West End work included roles in A View from the Bridge (opposite Anthony Quayle and Richard Harris), the title role in Serjeant Musgrave's Dance, Toys in the Attic, and The Devil's Disciple. He played Judge Brack in Hedda Gabler at the 1977 Edinburgh International Festival.

His last stage role was in a 1992 revival of All My Sons at the Young Vic.

=== Film and television ===
Bannen's film debut was in the early 1950s with a small role in Pool of London (1951), and he quickly rose to prominence, primarily in a wide range of supporting roles. He had a very significant role as Stoker Samuel Bannister in Yangtse Incident. During the early stages of his career he worked with the Boulting Brothers on Private's Progress and Carlton-Browne of the F.O.. His performance as "Ratbags" Crow in The Flight of the Phoenix earned him an Academy Award nomination for Best Supporting Actor, making him the first Scots actor to receive this honour; he also received a Golden Globe nomination for New Star of the Year – Actor. That same year, he starred alongside Sean Connery in the WWII prison drama The Hill.

Director John Schlesinger cast him as a replacement for Alan Bates in the part of well-off gay doctor Daniel Hirsh in his controversial film Sunday Bloody Sunday (1971), after Bates was deemed unavailable to shoot. According to screenwriter Penelope Gilliatt, Bannen never felt comfortable with the part. The anxiety adversely affected his performance during the early filming. Schlesinger replaced Bannen with Peter Finch, who received an Oscar nomination for the role. Bannen later regretted this and apologised for his conduct, saying not taking the role had set back his career.

Bannen received a BAFTA Award nomination for Best Supporting Actor for his performance as suspected child molester Kenneth Baxter in The Offence (1973). He also won acclaim for his roles as Jim Prideaux in the BBC adaptation of Tinker Tailor Soldier Spy (1979), Brother Benedict in Lamb (1986), Grandfather George in John Boorman's Hope and Glory (1987) (for which he received a second Best Supporting Actor BAFTA nomination), the elder Robert de Brus in Braveheart (1995) and as the touchingly crafty villager in Waking Ned (1998), the latter of which earned him both Screen Actors Guild Award and a Satellite Award.

In 1996, he was honoured with a Lifetime Achievement Award from BAFTA Scotland.

He was the subject of an episode of This is Your Life in 1999, when he was surprised by Michael Aspel.

== Personal life ==
Bannen married Marilyn Salisbury, a veterinary physician for the Ministry of Agriculture, in 1978. He had met Salisbury, 17 years his junior, in a car park following a performance as Hamlet. They had no children.

=== Death ===
Bannen was killed, aged 71, in a car accident near Loch Ness in November 1999. He and his wife, who had been driving, were discovered in an overturned vehicle in Knockies Straight between Inverness and Fort Augustus. Marilyn suffered only minor injuries, and lived until 2019.

His final films, Best and The Testimony of Taliesin Jones, were released posthumously in 2000.

== Legacy ==
Coatbridge College, Lanarkshire annually presents the Ian Bannen Memorial Award to the best actor or actress in its classes.

Bannen was posthumously given the 2000 Glenfiddich Spirit of Scotland Award.

== Partial stage credits ==
Year	Title	Role	Venue
1947	Armlet of Jade		Gate Theatre, Dublin
1951	Richard II	Ensemble member	Royal Shakespeare Theatre, Stratford-upon-Avon
1951	Henry IV, Part 1	Ensemble member	Royal Shakespeare Theatre, Stratford-upon-Avon
1951	Henry IV, Part 2	Ensemble member	Royal Shakespeare Theatre, Stratford-upon-Avon
1951	The Tempest	Shape	Royal Shakespeare Theatre, Stratford-upon-Avon
1951–1952	Henry V	Ensemble member	Royal Shakespeare Theatre, Stratford-upon-Avon
1952	Coriolanus	Servant	Royal Shakespeare Theatre, Stratford-upon-Avon
1952	The Tempest	Shape	Royal Shakespeare Theatre, Stratford-upon-Avon
1952	As You Like It	Silvius	Royal Shakespeare Theatre, Stratford-upon-Avon
1952	Othello	First Messenger	Royal Shakespeare Theatre, Stratford-upon-Avon
1952–1953	Macbeth	Third Murderer	Royal Shakespeare Theatre, Stratford-upon-Avon
1953	Othello	First Messenger	UK tour
1953	As You Like It	Silvius	UK tour
1953	Henry IV, Part 1	Francis, Servant	UK tour
1954	Othello	Officer	Royal Shakespeare Theatre, Stratford-upon-Avon
1954	A Midsummer Night's Dream	Flute	Royal Shakespeare Theatre, Stratford-upon-Avon
1954	Romeo and Juliet	Anthony	Royal Shakespeare Theatre, Stratford-upon-Avon
1954	The Taming of the Shrew	Curtis	Royal Shakespeare Theatre, Stratford-upon-Avon
1954	Troilus and Cressida	Ensemble member	Royal Shakespeare Theatre, Stratford-upon-Avon
1955	The Prisoners of War	Cpt. Rickman	Irving Theatre Club, London
1956	The Whiteheaded Boy	Peter	Royal Lyceum Theatre, Edinburgh
1956	Lead Me Gently		New Lindsey Theatre Club, London
1956	Blind Alley	Johnny Farrell	Theatre Royal, Windsor
1956	Blind Alley	Johnny Farrell	Cambridge Arts Theatre, Cambridge
1956	Voyage Ashore	Ginger, Antonous	Royal Lyceum Theatre, Edinburgh
1956–1957	A View from the Bridge	Marco	Comedy Theatre, London
1957	The Waiting of Lester Abbs	Lester Avvs	Royal Court Theatre, London
1958	The Iceman Cometh	Theodore "Hickey" Hickman	Arts Theatre, London
1958	The Iceman Cometh	Theodore "Hickey" Hickman	Winter Garden Theatre, London
1958	Long Day's Journey into Night	Jamie Tyrone Jr.	Globe Theatre, London
1959	Serjeant Musgrave's Dance	Serjeant Musgrave	Royal Court Theatre, London
1960	Toys in the Attic	Julian Berniers	Piccadilly Theatre, London
1961	Romeo and Juliet	Mercutio	Royal Shakespeare Theatre, Stratford-upon-Avon
1961	Othello	Iago	Royal Shakespeare Theatre, Stratford-upon-Avon
1961–1962	Hamlet	Hamlet	Royal Shakespeare Theatre, Stratford-upon-Avon
1961–1962	As You Like It	Orlando	Royal Shakespeare Theatre, Stratford-upon-Avon
1962	A Touch of the Poet	Cornelius Melody	Olympia Theatre, Dublin
1962	A Touch of the Poet	Cornelius Melody	Venice Biennale, Venice
1963	Blood Knot	Morris Pieterson	Arts Theatre, London
1964	Julius Caesar	Brutus	Royal Court Theatre, London
1965	The Devil's Disciple	Dick Dudgeon	Yvonne Arnaud Theatre, Guildford
1972	The Brass Hat	Brigadier John Brown	Yvonne Arnaud Theatre, Guildford
1977	Hedda Gabler	Judge Brack	Duke of York's Theatre, London
1977	Hedda Gabler	Judge Brack	Edinburgh Festival Theatre, Edinburgh
1978	Hush and Hide		UK tour
1980	Thine is the Kingdom	Jesus Christ	Liverpool Metropolitan Cathedral, Liverpool
1981	Translations	Hugh	Royal National Theatre, London
1983	A Moon for the Misbegotten	James Tyrone Jr.	Riverside Studios, London
1984	A Moon for the Misbegotten	James Tyrone Jr.	Cort Theatre, New York
1992	All My Sons	Joe Keller	Young Vic, London

== Partial filmography ==
- Pool of London (1951) as Garage attendant (uncredited)
- The Dark Avenger (1955) as French Knight (uncredited)
- Private's Progress (1956) as Private Horrocks
- The Long Arm (1956) as The Young Workman
- Yangtse Incident: The Story of H.M.S. Amethyst (1957) as AB Bannister RN
- Miracle in Soho (1957) as Filipo Gozzi
- The Birthday Present (1957) as Junior Customs Officer
- A Tale of Two Cities (1958) as Gabelle
- She Didn't Say No! (1958) as Peter Howard
- Behind the Mask (1958) as Alan Crabtree
- Carlton-Browne of the F.O. (1959) as Young King Loris
- A French Mistress (1960) as Colin Crane, The Headmaster's Son
- Suspect (1960) as Alan Andrews
- World in My Pocket (1961) as Kitson
- Station Six-Sahara (1962) as Fletcher
- Psyche 59 (1964) as Paul
- The Hill (1965) as Staff Sergeant Harris
- Mister Moses (1965) as Robert
- Rotten to the Core (1965) as Lt. Percy Vine
- Flight of the Phoenix (1965) as Crow
- Penelope (1966) as James B. Elcott
- The Sailor from Gibraltar (1967) as Alan
- Lock Up Your Daughters (1969) as Ramble
- Too Late the Hero (1970) as Pvt. Jock Thornton
- Jane Eyre (1970) as St. John Rivers
- The Deserter (1971) as British Army Capt. Crawford
- Fright (1971) as Brian
- Doomwatch (1972) as Dr. Del Shaw
- The Offence (1972) as Kenneth Baxter
- The Mackintosh Man (1973) as Slade
- From Beyond the Grave (1974) as Christopher Lowe (segment 2 "An Act of Kindness")
- Il Viaggio (1974) as Antonio Braggi
- The Driver's Seat (1974) as Bill
- The Gathering Storm (1974) as Adolf Hitler
- Bite the Bullet (1975) as Sir Harry Norfolk
- Sweeney! (1977) as Charles Baker
- Jesus of Nazareth (1977) as Amos
- The Inglorious Bastards (1977) as Col. Charles Thomas Buckner
- Satan's Wife (1979) as The Professor
- Tinker Tailor Soldier Spy (1979) as Jim Prideaux
- The Watcher in the Woods (1980) as John Keller
- Eye of the Needle (1981) as Godliman
- Night Crossing (1982) as Josef Keller
- Gandhi (1982) as Senior Officer Fields
- Hart to Hart (1983) as Wallace Davenport
- The Prodigal (1983) as Riley Wyndham
- Gorky Park (1983) as Iamskoy
- Lamb (1985) as Brother Benedict
- Defence of the Realm (1985) as Dennis Markham
- Hope and Glory (1987) as Grandfather George
- La Partita (1988) as Father of Francesco
- The Courier (1988) as McGuigan
- The Lady and the Highwayman (1989) as Christian Drysdale
- Witch Story (1989) as Father Matthew
- George's Island (1989) as Captain Waters
- Circles in a Forest (1990) as MacDonald
- Ghost Dad (1990) as Sir Edith Moser
- The Big Man (1990) as Matt Mason
- Speaking of the Devil (1991) as Luzifer
- The Treaty (1991) as David Lloyd George
- The Sound and the Silence (1991) as Melville
- Murder in Eden (1991) as Canon Loftus
- Damage (1992) as Edward Lloyd
- A Pin for the Butterfly (1994) as Grandpa
- Braveheart (1995) as Robert de Brus, 6th Lord of Annandale (the leper)
- Something to Believe In (1998) as Don Pozzi
- Waking Ned Devine (1998) as Jackie O'Shea
- To Walk with Lions (1999) as Terence Adamson
- Best (2000) as Sir Matt Busby
- The Testimony of Taliesin Jones (2000) as Billy Evans (final film role)

== Awards and nominations ==
Award	Year	Category	Work	Result
Academy Award	1966	Best Supporting Actor	The Flight of the Phoenix	Nominated
BAFTA Award	1974	Best Actor in a Supporting Role	The Offence	Nominated
BAFTA Award	1988	Best Actor in a Supporting Role	Hope and Glory	Nominated
BAFTA Scotland	1996	Lifetime Achievement Award	—N/a	Won
Critics' Circle Theatre Award	1981	Best Supporting Actor	Translations	Won
Genie Award	2001	Best Supporting Actor	To Walk with Lions	Nominated
Golden Globe Award	1966	New Star of the Year – Actor	The Flight of the Phoenix	Nominated
Satellite Award	1999	Best Actor in a Motion Picture	Waking Ned	Won (Note: Tied with David Kelly for the same film.)
Screen Actors Guild Award	1999	Outstanding Performance by a Cast in a Motion Picture	Waking Ned	Won
