= Nora O'Mahoney =

Irish actress and lay missionary ((1912–1989)

- Nora O'Mahoney as "Godmother" in Wanderly Wagon (1982)
- Born: May 10, 1912; Dublin, Ireland
- Died: October 18, 1989 (aged 77); County Dublin, Ireland
- Other name: Nora O'Mahony
- Occupations: Actor, missionary
- Known for: Theatre acting, Wanderly Wagon, Darby O'Gill and the Little People

Nora O'Mahoney (May 10, 1912– October 18, 1989) was an Irish actress and lay missionary, known for Molly Malloy in Darby O'Gill and the Little People (1959) and as Godmother in Wanderly Wagon (1967–1982).

== Early life and career ==
Born in Dublin, Ireland, in 1912, O'Mahoney started in theatre, and worked extensively in the 1930s and 1940s, including plays such as Drama at Inish (1933), Le Bourgeois Gentilhomme (1941), and The United Brothers (1942). She started her film career with some uncredited appearances in movies such as Captain Boycott (1947) and Daughter of Darkness (1948).

She emigrated to America in the early 1950s, where she continued to work in theatre, and was in a number a television episodes in anthology shows such as The 20th Century-Fox Hour (1955), Lux Video Theatre (1955), Front Row Center (1956), Climax! (1956), and Alfred Hitchcock Presents (1957). In 1959 she played a character named Molly Malloy in two productions, Darby O'Gill and the Little People (1959) and in Walt Disney's Wonderful World of Color (1959).

Soon after these two roles she gave up acting for a time, working as a lay missionary in Rhodesia, where she was Bishop Lamont's secretary for several years until she became ill, and was invalided home to Ireland.

She returned to acting in Ireland, first doing voice work on shows like Newsbeat (1964–1971), and then won the role of Godmother in Wanderly Wagon (1967–1982). Her last television role was as Mrs. Hodnott in an episode of The Irish R.M..

== Death ==
She died in October 1989 in Dublin, Ireland, aged 77.

== Filmography ==
=== Film ===
- Captain Boycott (1947) – Irish Villager (uncredited)
- Daughter of Darkness (1948) – Miss Hegarty (uncredited)
- Rally 'Round the Flag, Boys! (1958) – Town Meeting Speaker (uncredited)
- The Remarkable Mr. Pennypacker (1959) – Mrs. McNair (uncredited)
- Darby O'Gill and the Little People (1959) – Molly Malloy
- Holiday for Lovers (1959) – Mrs. Murphy

=== Television ===
- The 20th Century-Fox Hour (1955) – Ellen Bridges
- Lux Video Theatre (1955) – Martha
- Front Row Center (1956) – Aggie
- The Millionaire (1956) – Mother Superior
- Climax! (1956)
- General Electric Theater (1956)
- Alfred Hitchcock Presents (1957) (Season 2 Episode 32: "The Hands of Mr. Ottermole) – Flower Lady
- Little Moon of Alban (1958, TV Movie) – Shelagh Mangan
- The Californians (1958) – Mrs. Hayes / Molly McDonald
- Playhouse 90 (1958) – Abbey
- The Third Man (1959) – The Maid
- Walt Disney's Wonderful World of Color (1959) – Molly Malloy
- The Ann Sothern Show (1959) – Mrs. Riley / Brianie
- The Detectives (1960) – Irene
- Wanderly Wagon (1967–1982) – Godmother
- The Irish R.M. (1984) – Mrs. Hodnott (final appearance)
