= Summer of the Flying Saucer =

2008 film

Summer of the Flying Saucer is a 2008 Irish family film starring Robert Sheehan, Dan Colley, Hugh O'Conor, Joanne Kernan and Lorcan Cranitch. The film was directed by Martin Duffy.

Voiceover by Nicola Coughlan. The majority of the film was filmed in Kilkerrin, Co. Galway, with many people of Kilkerrin serving as extras.

== Cast ==
- Robert Sheehan as Danny
- Dan Colley as Lorcan
- Joanne Kernan Alien Girl / Janis
- Hugh O'Conor as Father Burke
- John Keogh as Dessie O'Connor
- Lorcan Cranitch as Ciaran
- Jens Winter as The Tall Man / Alien Space Pilot
- Sean Ganley as Barman
- Fintan Fahey as Pianist

== Voice over ==
- Nicola Coughlan as Janis voice
