= Whistle Through the Shamrocks =

Scripted comedy podcast by Nicola Coughlan

Whistle Through The Shamrocks is a six-episode scripted comedy podcast written and created by Nicola Coughlan and Camilla Whitehill and produced by Hat Trick Productions.

== Background ==
Coughlan announced the project in June 2021. The show debuted on November 1, 2021. Episodes were released every Monday on a weekly basis. The show is written and created by Nicola Coughlan and Camilla Whitehill. The show is Coughlan's debut project as a writer. The show is produced by Hat Trick Productions. The show is a six episode scripted comedy podcast. The show follows the poor O'Flanneryn family and their chip making business in the fictional town of Ballysnavougherenn, Ireland. The English lord Cromwell Dumblington intends to knock down the O'Flanneryn's home and build a chip factory. The Week called the show one of the best podcasts of 2021.

=== Cast and characters ===
- Amalia Vitale as Sister Abducta
- Andrew Scott
- Ben Miller as Cromwell Dumblington
- Brennock O'Connor as Paddy Jonny Tommy Paddy
- Camilla Whitehill as Camilla Parker-Dumblington
- Catherine Cohen as Aunt Bernadette
- David Ames
- Ed Gamble as Simpy Dumblington
- Jamie Beamish as Daddy O'Flanneryn
- Jonathan Van Ness as the Banshee
- Jordan Brookes as Oswald
- Kiell Smith-Bynoe as Father Surrupio
- Louisa Harland as Mammy O'Flanneryn
- Nicola Coughlan as Nelly O'Flanneryn and Granny Maureen
- Paul Mallon as IRA Jimmy
- Stephanie Beatriz as the Marilyn Bigfoot
- Susan Wokoma as Eloisa Louisa
