= The Fixer (2008 TV series) =

British television series

- Genre: Drama
- Created by: Ben Richards
- Starring: Andrew Buchan; Tamzin Outhwaite; Jody Latham; Liz White; Peter Mullan
- Country of origin: United Kingdom
- Original language: English
- No. of series: 2
- No. of episodes: 12

Production
- Running time: 45 minutes
- Production company: Kudos

Original release
- Network: ITV
- Release: 10 March 2008 – 6 October 2009

The Fixer is a British drama television series, produced by Kudos for ITV. Set in modern Britain, it follows the life of John Mercer, an ex-British Special Forces soldier, arrested by police for killing his aunt and uncle following his discovery of their abuse of his sister, Jess Mercer. John Mercer is released early from prison to serve in a covert state security squad as a government-backed assassin responsible for eliminating criminals and renegade police officers that the law cannot apprehend.

== Main cast ==
- Andrew Buchan as John Mercer
- Peter Mullan as Lenny Douglas
- Tamzin Outhwaite as Rose Chamberlain
- Jody Latham as Calum McKenzie
- Elisa Terren as Manuela
- Liz White as Jess Mercer (Series One only)
- Elliot Cowan as Matthew Symmonds (Series Two only)

== Filming locations ==
In Episode 1 of series 1, the production team visited Kent briefly in 2007 to shoot scenes at Botany Bay in Thanet.

== Episodes ==
=== Season 1 (2008) ===
No.	Title	Directed by	Written by	Original release date	UK viewers (millions)
1	"Episode One"	Alrick Riley	Ben Richards	10 March 2008	6.650
Only five years into his life sentence for killing his aunt and uncle – a crime committed when he discovered their abuse of his sister – John Mercer is released from prison. He's introduced to Lenny Douglas, a police officer ‘retired on grounds of ill health’. Mercer soon discovers that his newfound freedom comes at a price. Main Cast: Andrew Buchan as John Mercer, Peter Mullan as Lenny Douglas, Tamzin Outhwaite as Rose Chamberlain, Jody Latham as Calum McKenzie, Liz White as Jess Mercer, Elisa Terren as Manuela; Guest Stars: Tom Beard as Iain Risdale, Kim Medcalf as Caroline Risdale, Amelda Brown as Mercer's Aunt, Craig Storrod as Steve, Tony West as Minder, Oliver Bower as Robert Mercer, Tyler Anthony as Abigail Mercer
2	"Episode Two"	Alrick Riley	Ben Richards	17 March 2008	5.230
With the head of a notorious crime family dead, Lenny visits his successor, the vital police mole Jude Cassidy, to persuade him to come under police protection. Jude and an accomplice have recently been acquitted for the savage murder of a young black man whose cousin, Elviss Gilroy, is making plans to avenge his death. Reluctantly, Jude agrees to go into hiding, under the protection of an even more reluctant John Mercer who is forced to take him in. Main Cast: Andrew Buchan as John Mercer, Peter Mullan as Lenny Douglas, Tamzin Outhwaite as Rose Chamberlain, Jody Latham as Calum McKenzie, Liz White as Jess Mercer, Elisa Terren as Manuela; Guest Stars: Jay Taylor as Jude Cassidy, Steve Nicolson as Carl Cassidy, Robbie Gee as Elviss Gilroy, Sian Brooke as Melrose Cassidy, Tyler Anthony as Abigail Mercer
3	"Episode Three"	John Strickland	Ben Richards	24 March 2008	4.750
Lenny is alerted to the recent arrival of a notorious Albanian gangster Tarek Sokoli. Rather than have him killed, he instructs Mercer, Rose and Calum to scare him away – to send the message to any others planning on setting up in London that their attempts will fail. The unit target Sokoli's two main sources of income – prostitution and drugs. Main Cast: Andrew Buchan as John Mercer, Peter Mullan as Lenny Douglas, Tamzin Outhwaite as Rose Chamberlain, Jody Latham as Calum McKenzie, Liz White as Jess Mercer, Elisa Terren as Manuela; Guest Stars: Pedja Bjelac as Tarek Sokoli, Simon Kassianides as Saban Zira, Badria Timimi as Adelina Sokoli, Oliver Paxton as Uli Sokoli, Ian Burfield as Stevie Kent, Philip Wright as Paul, Naida Babic as Iliriana, David Graham as Albanian Man
4	"Episode Four"	John Strickland	Neil Cross	31 March 2008	4.810
Fed up with their lifestyle, Mercer takes Calum on an educational trip to the supermarket. Lenny finds them there and orders Mercer to kill Scott Glover, a man just acquitted of the murder of the young, innocent, 20-year-old Marie Greene. Mercer questions why they are killing a man innocent in the eyes of the law. Lenny's reluctance to divulge any further information has Mercer's interest piqued. Main Cast: Andrew Buchan as John Mercer, Peter Mullan as Lenny Douglas, Tamzin Outhwaite as Rose Chamberlain, Jody Latham as Calum McKenzie, Liz White as Jess Mercer, Elisa Terren as Manuela; Guest Stars: Ciarán McMenamin as Scott Glover, Saskia Reeves as Andrea Greene, Sebastian Abineri as George Rickard, Barnaby Kay as Danny Spader, Francesca Fowler as Marie Greene, Sarah Ball as Patsy McKenzie
5	"Episode Five"	Hettie MacDonald	Ben Richards	7 April 2008	4.800
Rose tells Lenny that a former member of Lenny's unit – John Mercer's predecessor, Patrick Finch – has gone on a vigilante-style rampage, meting out his particular brand of justice against drug-dealers, as well as two escort girls. Lenny tells Mercer to kill Finch, but events soon get complicated. Meanwhile, Hugh Berry, the man who sorts out the paperwork to cover the unit's illicit activities, asks Lenny to take out a hit on his behalf. A hit-and-run driver Trevor Bowyer rendered Hugh's grandson, Owen, mentally disabled, but only served two years for the crime. Whilst emphatic that they are not a bunch of vigilantes, Lenny is left in no doubt that if he doesn't send his hit man to kill Trevor Bowyer, then Hugh will find one of his own. Main Cast: Andrew Buchan as John Mercer, Peter Mullan as Lenny Douglas, Tamzin Outhwaite as Rose Chamberlain, Jody Latham as Calum McKenzie, Liz White as Jess Mercer, Elisa Terren as Manuela; Guest Stars: Paterson Joseph as Patrick Finch, Jack Shepherd as Hugh Berry, Poppy Miller as Caitlin Berry, Adam Parkinson as Owen Berry, Martin Brody as Trevor Bowyer, Oliver Bower as Robert Mercer, Tyler Anthony as Abigail Mercer
6	"Episode Six"	Hettie MacDonald	Ben Richards	14 April 2008	3.840
Lenny is targeting the kingpin of judicial corruption, Richard Blakeney, to expose his network of bent policemen and corrupt judges. Blakeney is everything Lenny hates, and his network is everything he wants to bring down. Lenny briefs Mercer on his delicate strategy, which involves exploiting Blakeney's hit man Georgie, who Calum and Mercer are spying on. Main Cast: Andrew Buchan as John Mercer, Peter Mullan as Lenny Douglas, Tamzin Outhwaite as Rose Chamberlain, Jody Latham as Calum McKenzie, Liz White as Jess Mercer, Elisa Terren as Manuela; Guest Stars: John Castle as Richard Blakeney, Aleksandr Mikic as Georgie, Oliver Bower as Robert Mercer, Tyler Anthony as Abigail Mercer

=== Season 2 (2009) ===
No.	Title	Directed by	Written by	Original release date	UK viewers (millions)
7	"Episode One"	Sam Miller	Ben Richards	1 September 2009	4.220
The team are sent to stop a gang terrorising the streets of south London but uncover a child trafficking operation. Main Cast: Andrew Buchan as John Mercer, Peter Mullan as Lenny Douglas, Tamzin Outhwaite as Rose Chamberlain, Jody Latham as Calum McKenzie, Elisa Terren as Manuela; Guest Stars: Mark Benton as Leo Westbrook, Phil Davis as Roger Bowland, Johann Myers as Clinton McSmith, Nichola Burley as Savanna Ford, Jamie Glover as Jamie, Ashley Chin as B, Rob Jarvis as Hyde
8	"Episode Two"	Sam Miller	Ben Richards	8 September 2009	3.880
With the operation to stop further child trafficking ever more difficult, Mercer and Calum go undercover as prisoners to watch and investigate a big crime boss who is masterminding the child trafficking operation from within his prison. Main Cast: Andrew Buchan as John Mercer, Peter Mullan as Lenny Douglas, Tamzin Outhwaite as Rose Chamberlain, Jody Latham as Calum McKenzie, Elliot Cowan as Matthew Symmonds, Elisa Terren as Manuela; Guest Stars: Mark Benton as Leo Westbrook, Phil Davis as Roger Bowland, Johann Myers as Clinton McSmith, Nichola Burley as Savanna Ford, Jamie Glover as Jamie, Rob Jarvis as Hyde, Peter Sullivan as Gabor Antonov, Jason Croot as Ivano Popov
9	"Episode Three"	Rachel O'Gorman	Christian Spurrier	15 September 2009	3.390
The team are assigned to take out an ex-SAS trooper turned Heroin smuggler, after broadcasts of the execution of three British soldiers. Main Cast: Andrew Buchan as John Mercer, Peter Mullan as Lenny Douglas, Tamzin Outhwaite as Rose Chamberlain, Jody Latham as Calum McKenzie, Elliot Cowan as Matthew Symmonds, Elisa Terren as Manuela; Guest Stars: Daniel Caltagirone as Gideon Stone, Saskia Butler as Talia Jade Stone, Lewis Alsamari as Hakan Celil, Daniel Betts as Dr. Phillip Palmer
10	"Episode Four"	Rachel O'Gorman	Ben Richards & Rachel Kidd	22 September 2009	3.310
Rose's past comes back to haunt her when a target she failed to take down, comes back for revenge, and John is falsely arrested for rape. Main Cast: Andrew Buchan as John Mercer, Peter Mullan as Lenny Douglas, Tamzin Outhwaite as Rose Chamberlain, Jody Latham as Calum McKenzie, Elliot Cowan as Matthew Symmonds; Guest Stars: David Harewood as Richard Millar, Patricia Potter as Hanna, Charlene McKenna as Paula, Geoffrey Whitehead as Bob Winters, Nathalie Armin as DS Rowe, Ingrid Oliver as Sadie
11	"Episode Five"	Paul Whittington	Ben Richards	29 September 2009	3.210
Rose and John go undercover in an illegal cagefighting scheme when Lenny orders them to execute a veteran armed robber with a reputation for changing his name and appearance. Main Cast: Andrew Buchan as John Mercer, Peter Mullan as Lenny Douglas, Tamzin Outhwaite as Rose Chamberlain, Jody Latham as Calum McKenzie, Elliot Cowan as Matthew Symmonds, Elisa Terren as Manuela; Guest Stars: David Schofield as Sean O'Driscoll, Sam Spurell as Connor O'Driscoll, Sadie Pickering as Gemma Price, David Legeno as Marty, Rupert Farley as Woody, Mark Flitton as Ashby
12	"Episode Six"	Paul Whittington	James Dormer	6 October 2009	2.820
A hitman arrives from India on a mission to kill a baby boy who is the heir to a huge fortune. His death would spark off a bloodbath in the Indian criminal underworld. Main Cast: Andrew Buchan as John Mercer, Peter Mullan as Lenny Douglas, Tamzin Outhwaite as Rose Chamberlain, Jody Latham as Calum McKenzie, Elliot Cowan as Matthew Symmonds, Elisa Terren as Manuela; Guest Stars: Paul Bhattacharjee as Chavan, Ace Bhatti as Supari, Anjali Jay as Madulika, Raji James as Vijay, Mark Flitton as Ashby, Sheena Bhattessa as Young Girl, Adetomiwa Edun as Young Guy

== Reception ==
The first episode received an audience of 6.65 million viewers, a 26.5% share, and episode two dropped 1.4m viewers, drawing 5.23 million, a 21.3% share of the audience. The next three episodes managed ratings of 4.75 million, 4.81 million and 4.80 million respectively. The last episode of the first series only managed 3.84 million (13.3% share), due to the episode competing against the start of a new run of Waking the Dead on BBC One which achieved double the share of that time slot.

Series one received a Royal Television Society award for Best Series.

Due to the critical acclaim and good ratings that the first series received, a second series was commissioned, which launched to 4.22 million viewers in September 2009. Series Two had disappointing ratings, dropping to as low as 2.82 million viewers by the season's end, and the show wasn't renewed for a third series.

== Ratings ==
=== Series One ===
Date	Episode	Viewers (millions)
10 March 2008	1	6.65
17 March 2008	2	5.23
24 March 2008	3	4.75
31 March 2008	4	4.81
7 April 2008	5	4.80
14 April 2008	6	3.84

=== Series Two ===
Date	Episode	Viewers (millions)
1 September 2009	1	4.22
8 September 2009	2	3.88
15 September 2009	3	3.39
22 September 2009	4	3.31
29 September 2009	5	3.21
6 October 2009	6	2.82

== Home releases ==
Series One was released on DVD in the UK on 21 April 2008. It contains all six episodes and a behind-the-scenes documentary. Series Two was released on 12 October 2009.
