= The Boy from Mercury =

- Directed by: Martin Duffy
- Written by: Martin Duffy
- Produced by: Marina Hughes
- Starring: Rita Tushingham; Tom Courtenay; Hugh O'Conor; James Hickey
- Cinematography: Seamus Deasy
- Edited by: John Victor-Smith
- Music by: Stephen McKeon
- Production company: Blue Dahlia Productions
- Distributed by: Clarence
- Release dates: 14 March 1996 (Premiere); 6 December 1996 (Ireland)
- Running time: 87 minutes
- Countries: Ireland; France; United Kingdom
- Language: English

The Boy from Mercury is a 1996 Irish-French-British film, the debut of writer and director Martin Duffy. The film concerns the science-fiction daydreams of a young boy in 1960 Dublin. Upon release, the film received international critical acclaim, and several awards, though was commercially unsuccessful. It was the first time actors Rita Tushingham and Tom Courtenay had appeared on screen together since Doctor Zhivago thirty years earlier. The film was also the debut of the Irish actor James Hickey.

The book of the making of the film, The Road to Mercury, written by the director and released in 2006 by Ogma Press.

== Cast ==
- Rita Tushingham
- Tom Courtenay
- Hugh O'Conor
- James Hickey

== Release ==
The film opened on 5 screens in Ireland on 6 December 1996 and grossed IR£3,806 in its first week.
