= Eugene Lambert =

Irish puppeteer (1928–2010)

- Born: 1928; County Sligo, Ireland
- Died: 23 February 2010 (aged 81–82); Monkstown, Dublin, Ireland
- Occupations: Puppeteer, actor

Eugene Lambert (1928 – 22 February 2010) was an Irish puppeteer and actor from County Sligo. He was owner of the Lambert Puppet Theatre in Monkstown, Dublin. He was noted for co-starring as O'Brien in the RTÉ television series Wanderly Wagon and for the Murphy agus a Cháirde ("Murphy and Friends") puppet television programme in the 1960s. He died in 2010 at the age of 82.

== Early life ==
Lambert was born and raised in County Sligo. His father was the county librarian and died at the age of 35. His mother took on his father's old job and Lambert was raised in a bookish home. He made his first puppet when he was 8 years old and was a proficient ventriloquist by the time he reached his early teens.

== Career ==
Lambert was long a stalwart of the Irish vaudeville scene, particularly in Dublin, although he also toured the country frequently with his wife Mai. His most common acts were with Finnegan, a mischievous storyteller, and Judge, a pensive dog. With the rise of television in the 1960s, the Lambert puppet theatre became a fixture in Irish broadcasting. In the early 1960s, Lambert devised a puppet series for children entitled Murphy agus a Chairde ("Murphy and His Friends"). Murphy was a giant who lived in a magical kingdom. Its king, "An Rí", only had one problem - constant mischief from two witches, Feemy and Babóg. RTÉ was the only station most people in Ireland could then access and Murphy's adventures were soon an important part of most children's viewing. Murphy himself appeared as the in-vision continuity announcer all through one of RTÉ's Christmas Day broadcasts.

In November 1963, Lambert drew international attention after he successfully acquired a driver's license for his puppet Finnegan. Lambert reported that he did so simply to show how easy it was for anybody in Ireland to obtain a license.

He later co-starred in the children's television series Wanderly Wagon as the mischievous and greedy O'Brien, known for his childlike curiosity and cowardice in the face of magical events. Lambert and his family provided many regular (puppet) characters — Judge the dog, Mr Crow (who lived in a cuckoo clock), the mysterious Foxy Loxy, and the untrustworthy Sneaky Snake. The series also featured Irish actor Frank Kelly who played the villainous Dr Astro.

Another series created by Eugene Lambert was adapted from a children's book by Patricia Lynch, Brógeen Follows The Magic Tune. Brógeen was a leprechaun who teamed up with a fiddler who had heard a piece of music created by the fairies - and they wanted it back. The series was a great success and won several awards internationally. Some years later, when Lambert enquired about the 2" master video tapes, RTÉ admitted to having re-used them. Brogeen (and most of Wanderly Wagon) was gone forever, although a dubbed version of Brogeen still exists in the archives of NRK.

== Lambert Puppet Theatre and Museum ==
Lambert and his wife Mai visited The Harlequin Puppet Theatre in Colwyn Bay, Wales and an International Puppet Festival in Prague. Inspired, they decided to open a puppet theatre of their own, The Lambert Puppet Theatre.

The Lambert Puppet Theatre was established in 1972. In the early years with Finnegan, Eugene toured UK and Ireland extensively and in later years he promoted Ireland for Irish Tourist Board, touring USA, Japan and Australia.

Lambert's Puppet Theatre was responsible for producing the popular 1980s children's television character Bosco who was an ever-present fixture on the Irish national station, with Lambert's daughters, Miriam and then Paula voicing and operating Bosco.

== Personal life ==
Lambert and his wife, Mai had ten children, two of whom predeceased him. In the 1950s, Lambert supplemented his day job as a refrigeration engineer with evenings appearing with his vent act at Gala concerts and dinners. The Lambert family participated in Jury's Irish Cabaret for seven years bringing topical puppet acts to the American audience.

Lambert died at his home in Monkstown, Dublin on Monday 22 February 2010, aged 82. His funeral on 26 February 2010 was attended by entertainers and politicians, with Liam Ó Maonlaí and Sinéad O'Connor singing at his Mass and a miniature Wanderly Wagon featuring in the ceremony.
