= Jonathan Ryan =

Irish actor

- Born: Ireland
- Occupation: Actor
- Years active: 1972–present

Jonathan Ryan is an Irish actor. Originally known for his role in Bosco, Ryan has also played Gerry Adams and Proinsias De Rossa on screen.

== Biography ==
As a pupil at C.B.C. Monkstown in 1963, Jonathan played rhythm guitar and shared vocals in the Rhythm & Blues band ROOTZGROOP, with Robbie Brennan, Rodney Williams, Dave McAnaney and Paul Brady.

Ryan's acting career began while still a full-time student, making his debut playing 'Dan' opposite Lynn Redgrave and Dan O'Herlihy in A Better Place at Dublin's Gate Theatre in 1972. He turned full-time in 1978 and since then has worked extensively on stage, in TV, film and radio and has been one of Ireland's busiest voiceover artists for forty-two years. He has recorded TV and radio commercials for clients worldwide, winning several awards for his work in this field.

== Filmography ==
- Stokes in The Outsider (1980), starring Sterling Hayden
- The priest in Bob Quinn's Budawanny (1987)
- Gibson in Taffin (1988), starring Pierce Brosnan
- Jimmy Reardon in Patriot Games (1992), starring Harrison Ford
- Scottish Prison Governor in In the Name of the Father (1993), starring Daniel Day-Lewis
- Broken Harvest (1994) as Narrator
- Goldsmith in Moll Flanders (1996), starring Morgan Freeman and Robin Wright Penn
- Hamish MacDonald in Kidnapped, starring Armand Assante
- Gerry Adams in Omagh (2004), starring Gerry McSorley
- The Major in John Vaughan's Valour (2006), starring Dave Duffy
- The Teacher in John Vaughan's My Dad (2007), starring Michael Liebmann and Jack Ryan
- The Father in The Portrait (2007), with Catherine Steadman
- Proinsias De Rossa in Brendan Smyth: Betrayal of Trust (TV movie)
- Sergeant Kenefick in Grabbers 2012, starring Richard Coyle
- Howard Wakefield in Chasing Leprechauns 2012 (TV movie) (post-production)

== Television ==
- Bosco Voice of Bosco (in the pilot series only) and Himself as presenter in the main series (RTÉ)
- 'Schooner' Cooney in Bracken (RTÉ)
- Doctor Jerome Hickey in The Irish RM (9 episodes, 1984–1985) Channel 4/RTÉ
- Randall McDonnell in The Year of the French (RTÉ)
- Heinz Fromme in Caught in a Free State (RTÉ)
- Sheridan in Summer Lightning (Channel 4)
- Against All Odds (BBC)
- 27 characters in Twink – RTÉ
- Tom Crowe in The Templewood Murder Mystery – RTÉ
- James Flanigan in Die glückliche Familie for Süddeutscher Rundfunk (1987)
- Hochzeitsreisen 'Verliebt, Verlobt, Verheiratet' for Norddeutscher Rundfunk
- Plunkett in Proof II (RTÉ)
- The French Ambassador in Seasons 1 – 3 of The Tudors (Showtime/BBC)
- Greg Hartnett in The Clinic (Season 5) RTÉ/Parallel Films
- Bill Taylor in Fair City (RTÉ)
- Iron Islands Priest in Game of Thrones (HBO)
- Nobleman in Vikings (2013 TV series) (History Channel)
- Baron Broadmore in Into The Badlands (AMC)

== Theatre ==
- Jacob Milne in Night and Day – at the Abbey Theatre – Dublin Theatre Festival 1981
- Bob in The Silver Dollar Boys – at the Peacock and Abbey Theatres
- Guildenstern in Michael Bogdanov's production of Hamlet – at the Abbey Theatre
- Archer in The Beaux Stratagem – at the Abbey Theatre
- Miles in The Death and Resurrection of Mister Roche – at the Abbey Theatre
- Dan in A Better Place – at the Gate Theatre
- The Gentleman Caller in The Glass Menagerie – at the Gate Theatre
- Giovanni in Innocence (The Life of Caravaggio) – at the Gate Theatre
- Aslak and Balloon in Peer Gynt – at the Gate Theatre
- Tigellinus in Salomé – at the Gate Theatre (Toured to the Edinburgh Festival and Spoleto Festival USA in Charleston, South Carolina)
- Bill Sikes in the Noel Pearson/Cameron Mackintosh production of Oliver! – at the Olympia Theatre
- Abanazar in Aladdin – at the Olympia Theatre
- Gaston Laschailles in Gigi! – at the Gaiety Theatre
- Oscar Lindquist in Sweet Charity – at the Gaiety Theatre
- Mortimer Brewster in Arsenic and Old Lace – at the Gaiety Theatre – Dublin Theatre Festival 1985
- Bogart in Woody Allen's Play it again, Sam – at the Eblana Theatre
- Marlowe in Paddy Meegan's Kiss n'Tell – at the Andrew's Lane Theatre
- Liam in Liam Liar – at the Pavilion and Oscar Theatres
- Joe Fell in I Do Not Like Thee, Doctor Fell – at the Oscar Theatre
- Mister Toad in Toad of Toad Hall – at the Oscar Theatre
- Paul Sheldon in Stephen King's Misery, with Helen Norton – on Irish national tour.
- We Do It for Love, The Colleen Bawn, The Cuchulainn Cycle, The Evangelist, A Midsummer Night's Dream and Grease – all at the Lyric Theatre Belfast.
- Benvolio in Romeo and Juliet, with The Dublin Theatre Festival production on tour to the City Theatre Hong Kong.
- Performed The Durkan Suite, accompanied by composer Bill Whelan and the London Chamber Orchestra.
- Adolf in Roger Doyle's Adolf Gebler Clarinettist, with the RTÉ Concert Orchestra – both at the National Concert Hall Dublin

== Awards ==
The Irish International Advertising Awards Festival: Premier (Individual) Craft Award – Individual Craft Award.

The Institute of Creative Advertising and Design (ICAD) Awards: Individual Craft Award for Best Performance on Radio or TV – Individual Award for Exceptional Merit – Individual Craft Award.
