= Jan Mitchell =

Australian artist (1940–2008)

- Born: 1940; Melbourne, Victoria, Australia
- Died: 17 March 2008 (aged 67–68); Geelong, Victoria, Australia
- Known for: Book illustration, printmaking, painting, sculpture

Jan Mitchell (1940 – 17 March 2008) was an Australian artist, born in Melbourne, known for her painted bollards and work as a television graphic artist.

== Early life and career ==
She spent her formative childhood years near Healesville, Victoria, before working in Ireland for 18 years, in the graphics department at RTÉ (Irish National television). Her pioneering work in Ireland included designing and creating the country's first pre-school television show, named after its red-haired central character Bosco.

She returned to Australia in 1986 after 20 years in England and Ireland, and settled in Geelong in 1990, turning to book illustration, painting and printmaking. She created her first bollard art in Barwon Heads as part of an artist-in-schools program. She took the concept of the Baywalk Bollards to Geelong city commissioners in 1994, and by 1999 there were over 100 brightly painted bollards, made out of recovered wharf pylons, scattered along the foreshore, depicting notable characters relating to Geelong's history and culture. Her bollards can also be seen at Melbourne Airport and Avalon Airport.

== Awards ==
In 2006, Mitchell received an Order of Australia medal for her contribution to Geelong's waterfront transformation.

== Jan Mitchell Memorial Art Prize ==
The Zonta Club of Geelong Inc. celebrates International Women's Day with an art exhibition titled "Women – a Celebration", presented by artists of the Geelong region using a range of different media. The first prize is the Jan Mitchell Memorial Art Award.

== Death ==
Mitchell died of cancer on St Patrick's Day 2008, in Geelong. At her request, her ashes were scattered beside the lake at Glendalough, Ireland.
