= Nicola Coughlan =

Irish actress (born 1987)

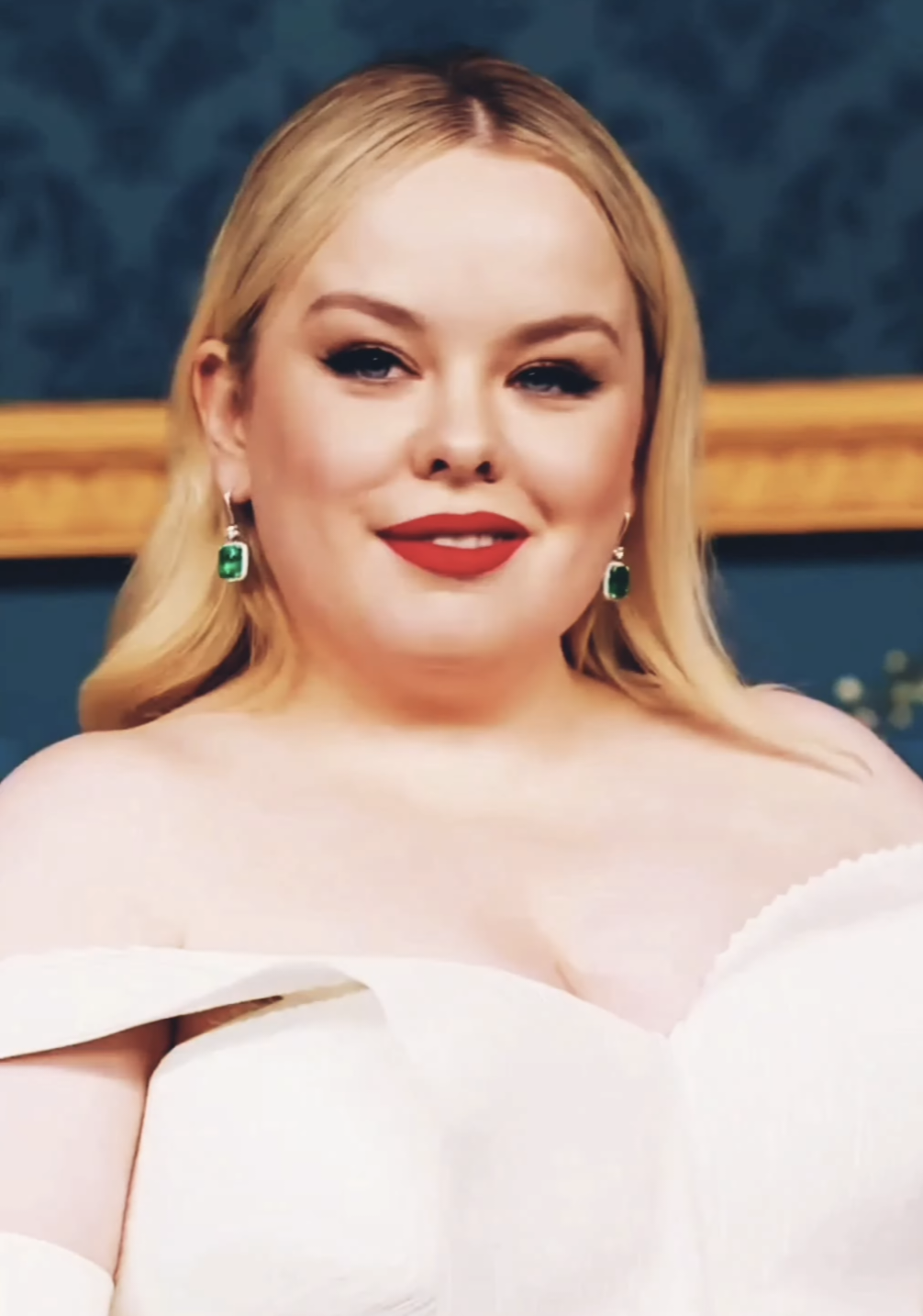
- Coughlan in 2024
- Born: Nicola Mary Coughlan; 9 January 1987 (age 39); Galway, Ireland
- Education: Calasanctius College; NUI Galway; Oxford School of Drama; Birmingham School of Acting
- Occupation: Actress
- Years active: 1997–present
- Notable credits: Derry Girls; Bridgerton

Nicola Mary Coughlan (/ˈkɒxlən/; born 9 January 1987) is an Irish actress. She is best known for her roles as Clare Devlin in the Channel 4 sitcom Derry Girls (2018–2022) and Penelope Featherington in the Netflix period drama Bridgerton (2020–present). She earned a Screen Actors Guild Awards nomination for playing Penelope in the third series of Bridgerton and received a British Academy Television Award nomination for her role as Maggie Donovan in Big Mood (2024–present).

== Early life and education ==
Coughlan was born on 9 January 1987 in Galway, Ireland, and grew up in nearby Oranmore. The youngest of four siblings, her father served in the Irish Army. He died in 2017, and her mother was a stay-at-home parent.

At the age of five, while watching her sister perform in a school play, Coughlan decided she wanted to become an actress. She attended Scoil Mhuire Primary School and Calasanctius College. She graduated with a degree in English and Classical Civilisation from the National University of Ireland, Galway. She went on to train in England at the Oxford School of Drama and Birmingham School of Acting.

== Career ==
=== Beginnings (2004–2017) ===
In 1997, at the age of 9, Coughlan had an uncredited role in the action thriller film My Brother's War. In 2004, she started her career with a role in Tom Collins' short film The Phantom Cnut, a revenge comedy. In the following years, Coughlan did voice work in animated series and films, including The Fairytales from 2004 to 2005, Summer of the Flying Saucer in 2008, Simsala Grimm II: The Adventures of Yoyo and Doc Croc in 2010, Thor: Legend of the Magical Hammer in 2011, and Ivan the Incredible in 2012. She made brief appearances in the soap opera Doctors in 2012 and the musical comedy film Svengali in 2013.

After drama school, Coughlan moved to London three times in four years, and each time was forced to move back home with her parents in Ireland due to financial difficulties. She suffered from depression during this period, and received help from her family. She worked part-time at an optician in Galway, and later responded to an open casting call for Jess and Joe Forever at The Old Vic in London and The Orange Tree Theatre in Richmond, winning the main role of Jess. Her first performance was in September 2016, prior to a national tour.

=== Breakthrough (2018–2020) ===
In 2018, Coughlan began playing Clare Devlin, one of the main characters in Derry Girls, a sitcom set in Derry, Northern Ireland, in the 1990s during the final years of The Troubles. Coughlan has said that her Northern Irish accent was inspired by Girls Aloud's Nadine Coyle. Derry Girls is Channel 4's most successful comedy since Father Ted, and the most watched show in Northern Ireland since modern records began in 2002. In July 2018, the cast appeared on challenge game show The Crystal Maze. In December 2018, Coughlan competed against some of her Derry Girls co-stars in an episode of The Great British Bake Off.

Though Derry Girls was broadcast in January and February 2018 on Channel 4, it was after its rerelease onto Netflix in December that same year that the show gained international audience and popularity. The third and last series aired from 12 April 2022 to 18 May 2022 on Channel 4, and was released on Netflix on 7 October 2022. Derry Girls has received nominations at the British Academy Television Awards, winning Best Scripted Comedy in 2023, and the Irish Film and Television Awards, including winning Best Comedy in 2018.

Coughlan played Hannah Dalton in Harlots, a period drama television series set in 18th-century London. 2018 marked her West End debut in The Donmar Warehouse's production of The Prime of Miss Jean Brodie. In September, the Evening Standard named her "one of the Rising Stars of 2018". Coughlan has stated that she auditioned for the part of Robin Buckley in season 3 of Stranger Things, but did not get the part.

In 2020, she starred alongside Hannah Bristow in audio play podcast series, A Passion Play, about two teenagers' first love colliding with the Crucifixion of Jesus.

=== Wider recognition (2021–present) ===
In 2019, it was announced that Coughlan had been cast in the Netflix series Bridgerton, which premiered in December 2020. Coughlan played Penelope Featherington, a reluctant debutante and youngest daughter of a nouveau riche family in Regency era London. Coughlan's role was significantly cut back in the third series of Derry Girls in 2022 due to scheduling conflicts with Bridgerton and the coronavirus pandemic. The third season of Bridgerton focused on Coughlan's character's love story with Luke Newton's Colin Bridgerton. For her lead role as Penelope Featherington in the third season of Bridgerton, Coughlan received a Screen Actors Guild Awards nomination for Outstanding Performance by a Female Actor in a Drama Series, and a second nomination for Outstanding Performance by an Ensemble in a Drama Series, having received a nomination for the first season of Bridgerton. Coughlan also received an IFTA Film & Drama Awards nomination for Lead Actress in a Drama. Coughlan was nominated for Best Actress in a Drama Series and Best Cast Ensemble in Streaming Drama Series at The Astra Awards. Coughlan returned for the fourth season of Bridgerton, which was released in 2026. Coughlan confirmed a reduced role for the fifth season of Bridgerton, which will be released in 2027.

In June and July 2021, Coughlan was nominated for Best Actress in a Supporting Role - Drama for Bridgerton, and nominated and won Rising Star Award at the IFTA Film & Drama Awards. In November 2021, The Hollywood Reporter included Coughlan in its Next Gen Talent 2021: The Hollywood Reporter's Rising Young Stars. In 2021, along with Big Mood creator and writer Camilla Whitehill, Coughlan co-created, co-wrote and starred in Whistle Through the Shamrocks, a six-episode scripted comedy podcast. Coughlan presented History's Youngest Heroes, a twelve-episode history podcast focusing on the stories of twelve people from across history, on BBC Radio 4.

In November 2022, Coughlan was honoured with Glamour's Women of the Year TV Actor Awards. In February 2023, Coughlan was awarded Best Newcomer at the Newport Beach Film Festival UK Honours. In July 2023, Coughlan made a brief appearance in Barbie as Diplomat Barbie, citing scheduling conflicts for the short time she was in the film. In the same year, she voiced the Playroom Fairy in Apple TV+ Christmas special The Velveteen Rabbit, based on the children's book of the same name. Coughlan portrayed Queen Victoria in the 2023 Dodger Christmas special on BBC One and CBBC.

In March 2024, Coughlan portrayed the leading role of Maggie, a sufferer of bipolar disorder, co-starring alongside Lydia West in Channel 4 sitcom Big Mood, a six-part dramedy series about two best friends navigating friendship amidst a mental health crisis. Big Mood was Channel 4's most-watched new comedy launch since Derry Girls, and Coughlan received praise for her role as Maggie Donovan. Coughlan received her first British Academy Television Awards nomination for Best Female Performance in a Comedy. She won Best Comedy Performance at the TV Choice Awards 2025. A second season of Big Mood was confirmed in February 2025, and premiered in April 2026.

Coughlan starred as Humble Joan alongside Aimee Lou Wood and Lolly Adefope in Seize Them!, a 2024 comedy film set in the Dark Ages. In December 2024, Coughlan played the title role in the 2024 Doctor Who Christmas special, "Joy to the World", written by Steven Moffat, alongside Barbie co-star Ncuti Gatwa as the Fifteenth Doctor. In October 2024, Coughlan was named in Time 100 Next's 2024. She was named in Variety's 2024 Power Women of Hollywood. Coughlan was the cover of Time's 28 October 2024 issue, having been named as one of Time's Next Generation Leaders. Vanity Fair and TV Insider praised her performance as Penelope Featherington in Bridgerton and Maggie Donovan in Big Mood as one of the 24 best performances of 2024. She was IMDb's second Most Popular Breakout Star of 2024, and seventh Most Popular Star of 2024. She was named as one of the best-dressed women of 2024 by Harper's Bazaar UK.

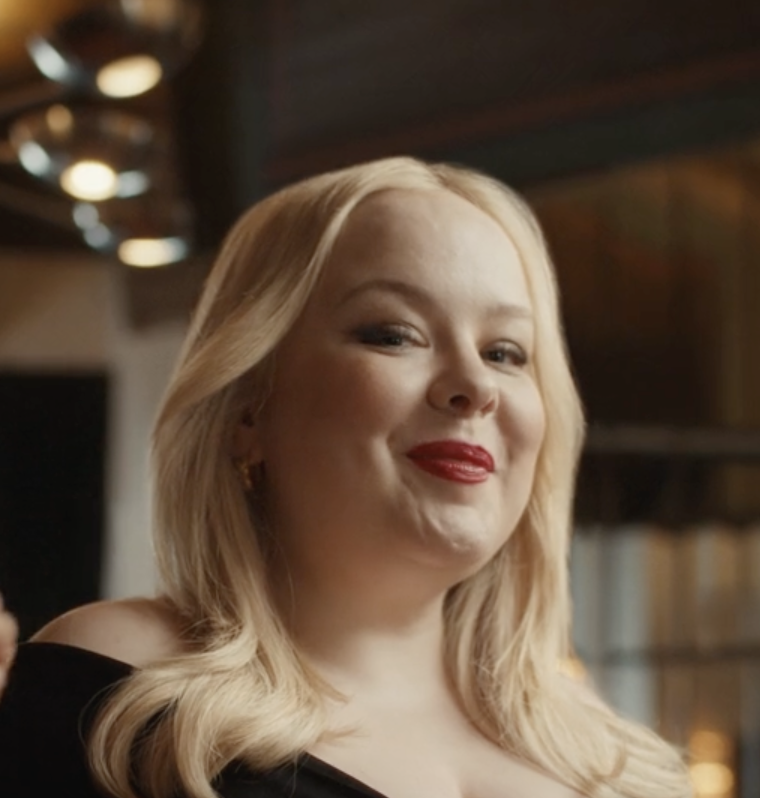
Coughlan in 2025

Coughlan was named in Elle's "40 for 40: The Women In Film And Television Power List", which lists women that "will shape what - and how - you watch for decades to come". The Independent named Coughlan in its "Independent Women 2025 - The Influence List" which listed 50 of the most influential women in the UK. Coughlan was honoured with the Konbini Commitment Award, which recognizes a talent or a series that has distinguished itself by the artistic quality and the societal, innovative or revolutionary dimension of its work, at the 8th Cannes International Series Festival (Canneseries). In May 2025, Coughlan was named 36th in Radio Times' TV 100 of the most influential people in TV. In June 2025, Coughlan was included on Pride Power List 2025 as one of the "Celebrity Allies Using Their Platform to Stand Up For Our Community When It Counts." Coughlan was shortlisted for the Celebrity of the Year Award at the National Diversity Awards 2025.

Coughlan made her Royal National Theatre debut playing Margaret (Pegeen) Flaherty in John Millington Synge's The Playboy of the Western World in the Lyttelton Theatre from 4 December 2025 to 28 February 2026. Coughlan had a voice role in Sony Pictures Animation's Goat, which had its theatrical release on 13 February 2026. Coughlan played the role of Silky in the adaptation of Enid Blyton's The Magic Faraway Tree. Two sequels to The Magic Faraway Tree are in development, with production anticipated to start in 2027. Coughlan hosted the fifth episode of the first season of Saturday Night Live UK, alongside musical guest Foo Fighters. Coughlan is set to lead the fourth season of Channel 4’s BAFTA-winning I Am... anthology series. Coughlan joined the sixth season of Only Murders in the Building in a recurring role.

Coughlan was listed in Variety's inaugural Women's Impact Report UK in May 2026, which recognizes executives and talent in the UK that drove top features and series, winning awards and leading companies to greater things.

Coughlan joined the voice cast of Netflix's Charlie vs. the Chocolate Factory, led by Kit Connor as Charlie Paley and Taika Waititi as Willy Wonka, which will be released globally in theatres 5 November 2027. Coughlan was also cast alongside Naomi Scott, Imelda Staunton and Dominic West in Netflix's six-part untitled drama based on Roald Dahl's short story for adults.

Coughlan has narrated several audiobooks, including Sense and Sensibility by Jane Austen, Big Girl, Small Town (abridged) by Michelle Gallen, The Temple House Vanishing by Rachel Donohue, Listening Still by Anne Griffin, Aren't We Lucky by Sarah Forbes Stewart, and an Audible Original, Misdirected by Lucy Parker, alongside Gwilym Lee. In November 2022, she appeared in a Sam Mendes produced Audible audio adaptation of Oliver Twist. Coughlan has narrated Juno Dawson's Her Majesty's Royal Coven, The Shadow Cabinet, Queen B, and Human Rites. She narrated two chapters of Meet the Georgians: Epic Tales from Britain's Wildest Century by Robert Peal ("Anne Bonny and Mary Read, pirate queens of the Caribbean" and "Ladies of Llangollen, the lovers who built paradise in a Welsh valley") alongside Bridgerton co-star Adjoa Andoh, and she appeared in a cameo role as Countess Christiana in That Friend by Sabrina Brier.

== Other ventures ==
=== Endorsements ===
In March 2022, Coughlan became the muse and face of Pat McGrath Labs x Bridgerton II make-up collection. In October 2023, Coughlan partnered with Uber Eats Australia for its campaign to help address period poverty. In June 2024, Coughlan starred in Skims' campaign for the brand's Soft Lounge Collection. In August 2024, Coughlan starred in Kate Spade New York's Fall Campaign, alongside Taraji P. Henson and Marsai Martin. In February 2025, Coughlan starred in Neutrogena's "Main Character Energy" campaign. In April 2025, Coughlan featured in Olaplex's "Designed to Defy" campaign. In May 2026, Coughlan was tapped to voice ads for Kerrygold's "Make It Gold With Kerrygold" campaign.

=== Charity and advocacy ===
In February 2019, 28 women with their suitcases led by Coughlan crossed London's Westminster Bridge to demand the decriminalisation of abortion in Northern Ireland. They represented the estimated number of women a week who had to travel to England to access abortion. On 26 June 2020, Coughlan and her fellow Derry Girls co-stars performed a sketch with Saoirse Ronan for the RTÉ fundraising special RTÉ Does Comic Relief. The night's proceeds went to those affected by the COVID-19 pandemic.

Coughlan is an ambassador for LauraLynn Ireland's Children's Hospice, which provides specialist palliative and supportive care services. In July 2020, she auctioned off an Alex Perry dress and raised €5,000 for the hospice. In May 2022, Couglan auctioned off her Season 3 Derry Girls Wrap Jacket and raised €22,197. In December 2022, she auctioned off her Season 2 Bridgerton wrap bag, signed by herself and some other Bridgerton stars, raising €23,721 for LauraLynn.

On 12 April 2022 upon the release of the third series of Derry Girls, Coughlan protested the attempted privatisation of Channel 4, posting a picture of herself holding up a middle finger on Instagram and linking to a change.org petition. On 28 June 2024, Coughlan collaborated with DJ and record producer Ellis Miah to release "Shoes... More Shoes", with profits from the song being donated to two charities, Not A Phase and The Trevor Project, in celebration of Pride Month.

Coughlan was one of over two thousand to sign an Artists for Palestine letter calling for a ceasefire and accusing Western governments of "not only tolerating war crimes but aiding and abetting them." In July 2024, Coughlan raised over $2 million for Urgent Gaza Relief and Recovery, a campaign organized by Palestine Children's Relief Fund to address urgent humanitarian needs and support long-term recovery efforts in the Gaza Strip. On 9 October 2024, in her speech as a TIME100 Next honoree, Coughlan called for the U.S. and UK to "stop sending arms to Israel, to release the hostages, [and] to send aid into Gaza." In December 2024, Coughlan partnered up with HURR and Choose Love to rent out a selection of her wardrobe, with proceeds going to Choose Love, a UK-based charity supporting refugees and displaced people all over the world. Coughlan is a signatory of the Film Workers for Palestine boycott pledge that was published in September 2025.

In April 2025, following the UK Supreme Court's ruling to exclude trans women from the legal definition of 'woman', Coughlan expressed her support for the transgender and non-binary community. On Instagram, she said that she was "completely horrified" by the ruling. She started a fundraiser for Not a Phase, a charity helping trans people, in response. She added, "Now's the time to speak up and make your voice heard. Let your trans, non-binary friends and the community at large know that you're there for them and we'll keep fighting for them." Coughlan has raised more than £100,000 as of 19 April 2025. Coughlan was one of over a thousand film and television industry figures to sign an open letter pledging "solidarity with the trans, non-binary and intersex communities" and condemning both the ruling and the subsequent Equality and Human Rights Commission guidance. On 24 July 2025, Coughlan started a fundraiser for Medical Aid for Palestinians, which has raised over £350,000 as of 26 July 2025, with Coughlan contributing £10,000 of her own money.

== Personal life ==
In January 2018, upon the airing of the first episodes of Derry Girls, social media became inundated with comments expressing shock at the then-31-year-old having been cast as a 16-year-old character. In April 2024, when aged 37 years, more such commentary appeared. Coughlan shared that she found the discourse about her age "funny"; she has never hidden her age, despite having been advised to do so. Coughlan shared that, prior to booking Derry Girls in her late 20s, some casting directors had refused to see her because she was "too old."

In October 2017, in a now-deleted tweet, Coughlan shared that she had been teen-aged when she was told by an "older, respected director" that if she wanted to impress him in an acting competition, she should perform naked. Coughlan elaborated: "I was a kid, but no woman of any age should be spoken to that way by a man in a position of power, ever. Trust me, I have a lot worse stories than that."

In 2018, while Coughlan was appearing on stage in The Prime of Miss Jean Brodie at London's Donmar Warehouse, she wrote a piece for The Guardian calling out the unfair scrutiny of women's bodies common in theatre criticism. The following year, she made headlines again for rebutting the Daily Mirror's comment on her 2019 British Academy Television Awards look: "Not the most flattering". She tweeted "I mean incorrect @DailyMirror I look smokin', sorry bout it". Following the 2021 Golden Globe Awards, she challenged other comments about her weight on Twitter.

In June 2024, Coughlan responded to a comment calling her "very brave" for her intimacy scenes in season 3 of Bridgerton by stating: "You know, it is hard, because I think women with my body type – women with perfect breasts – we don't get to see ourselves on screen enough. I'm very proud as a member of the perfect breasts community. I hope you enjoy seeing them." In the same month, Coughlan rebuffed claims by Internet trolls that Bridgerton photoshopped her waist, clarifying, "If you wear corsetry for long enough, your body really molds to it."

In March 2026, Coughlan spoke to Elle UK about being diagnosed with attention deficit hyperactivity disorder (ADHD) in her 30s and body shaming. She is in a relationship with English actor Jake Dunn.

== Acting credits ==
=== Film ===
Key
†	Denotes films that have not yet been released

Year	Title	Role	Notes	Ref.
1997	My Brother's War	Little girl feeding swans	Uncredited role	
2004	The Phantom Cnut	Katie	Short film	
2008	Summer of the Flying Saucer	Janis (voice)		
2011	Thor: Legend of the Magical Hammer	Edda (voice)		
2012	Jelly T	Lottie (voice)		
2013	Svengali	Club Girl		
2020	Her Song	Eve (voice)	Short film	
2023	Barbie	Diplomat Barbie		
2023	The Velveteen Rabbit	Playroom Fairy (voice)	Short film	
2024	Seize Them!	Humble Joan		
2026	Goat	Olivia Burke (voice)		
2026	The Magic Faraway Tree	Silky		
2027	Charlie vs. The Chocolate Factory †	TBA (voice)		

=== Television ===
Year	Title	Role	Notes	Ref.
2004–2005	The Fairytaler	Various	Voice; 7 episodes	
2010	Simsala Grimm II: The Adventures of Yoyo and Doc Croc	Various	Voice; English version; 26 episodes	
2012	Doctors	Marie Callaghan	Episode: "Every End Has a Start"	
2018–2022	Derry Girls	Clare Devlin	Main role; 18 episodes	
2018	Harlots	Hannah Dalton	7 episodes	
2020	The Great British Bake Off	Herself	Contestant, Episode: "The Great Festive Bake Off"	
2020–present	Bridgerton	Penelope Bridgerton (née Featherington)	Main role; 32 episodes	
2020–2021	Would I Lie to You?	Herself	Panelist, Series 14 Episode 6	
2021	Taskmaster	Herself	Contestant, Episode: "New Year Treat: The Fastest Duck"	
2021	RuPaul's Drag Race UK	Herself	Guest judge, Episode: "Great Outdoors"	
2023	Dodger	Queen Victoria	Episode: "Coronation"	
2024–present	Big Mood	Maggie Donovan	Main role; 12 episodes	
2024	Doctor Who	Joy Almondo	Episode: "Joy to the World"	
2024	Rob Beckett's Smart TV	Herself	Panelist, Series 1 Episode 2	
2026	Saturday Night Live UK	Herself	Episode: "Tina Fey/Wet Leg"	
2026	Saturday Night Live UK	Herself	Episode: "Nicola Coughlan/Foo Fighters"	
2026	I Am Helen	Helen		
2026	Only Murders in the Building †	TBA		

=== Audio ===
Year	Title	Role	Notes	Ref.
2020	Big Girl, Small Town		Audiobook	
2020	The Temple House Vanishing		Audiobook	
2021	Whistle Through the Shamrocks	Tiny Nenny/Granny Maureen/Herself	Podcast series; also creator and writer	
2021	Meet the Georgians: Epic Tales from Britains' Wildest Century	Herself	Audiobook (Nonfiction)	
2022	Oliver Twist	Nancy	Podcast series	
2022	Her Majesty's Royal Coven		Audiobook	
2023	The Shadow Cabinet: Her Majesty's Royal Coven Book 2		Audiobook	
2023	Sense and Sensibility		Audiobook	
2024	Queen B: Her Majesty's Royal Coven Book 0.5		Audiobook	
2025	That Friend	Countess Christiana	Audiobook	
2025	Misdirected		Audiobook	
2025	Aren't We Lucky		Audiobook	

=== Theatre ===
Year	Title	Role	Director	Venue	Notes	Ref.
2013	Chapel Street	Kirsty	Bryony Shanahan	—N/a	UK Tour; Scrawl Theatre Company	
2014	Duck	Sophie	Stella Feehily	—N/a	Tour; Out of Joint Theatre Company	
2015	Nadya	Elena	Sarah Meadows	Park Theatre		
2015–2017	Jess and Joe Forever	Jess	Derek Bond	The Old Vic		
2015–2017	Jess and Joe Forever	Jess	Derek Bond	Orange Tree Theatre		
2015–2017	Jess and Joe Forever	Jess	Derek Bond	Traverse Theatre		
2018	The Prime of Miss Jean Brodie	Joyce Emily	Polly Findlay	Donmar Warehouse		
2025–2026	The Playboy of the Western World	Pegeen Mike	Caitríona McLaughlin	National Theatre (Lyttelton Theatre)		

== Awards and nominations ==
Awards and nominations received by Nicola Coughlan
Year	Award	Category	Nominated work	Result	Ref.
2017	Offie	Best Actress in a Play	Jess and Joe Forever	Nominated	
2021	Screen Actors Guild Awards	Outstanding Performance by an Ensemble in a Drama Series	Bridgerton	Nominated	
2021	Irish Film and Television Awards	Rising Star Award	Herself	Won	
2021	Irish Film and Television Awards	Best Actress in a Supporting Role – Drama	Bridgerton	Nominated	
2022	Glamour Women of the Year Awards	TV Actor	Bridgerton; Derry Girls	Won	
2023	Newport Beach Film Festival UK Honors	Best Newcomer	Herself	Won	
2024	Edinburgh TV Awards	Best TV Actor – Comedy	Big Mood	Nominated	
2024	Harper's Bazaar Women of the Year	Television Actress	Bridgerton; Big Mood	Won	
2024	Gold Derby Awards	Ensemble Cast	Barbie	Nominated	
2024	Rolling Stone UK Awards	Television Award	Big Mood	Nominated	
2024	TIME 100 Next	Next Generations Leaders	Herself	Won	
2025	TV Choice Awards	Best Drama Performance	Bridgerton	Nominated	
2025	TV Choice Awards	Best Comedy Performance	Big Mood	Won	
2025	Metro Pride Awards	Celebrity of the Year	Herself	Nominated	
2025	Screen Actors Guild Awards	Outstanding Performance by an Ensemble in a Drama Series	Bridgerton	Nominated	
2025	Screen Actors Guild Awards	Outstanding Performance by a Female Actor in a Drama Series	Bridgerton	Nominated	
2025	Irish Film and Television Awards	Lead Actress – Drama	Bridgerton	Nominated	
2025	British Academy Television Awards	Best Female Performance in a Comedy	Big Mood	Nominated	
2025	The Astra Awards	Best Actress in a Drama Series	Bridgerton	Nominated	
2025	The Astra Awards	Best Cast Ensemble in Streaming Drama Series	Bridgerton	Nominated	
2025	National Diversity Awards	Celebrity of the Year Award	Herself	Nominated	

== See also ==
- List of Irish actors
