= Rhidian Brook =

Welsh novelist, screenwriter and broadcaster

- Born: 1964 (age 60–61); Tenby, Wales
- Occupation(s): Novelist, screenwriter, broadcaster

Rhidian Brook (born March 1964) is a Welsh novelist, screenwriter and broadcaster.

== Biography ==
Brook was born in Tenby in 1964. He attended Churcher's College in Hampshire, leaving in 1982. His first novel, The Testimony of Taliesin Jones (HarperCollins) won three prizes, including the 1997 Somerset Maugham Award, and was made into a film of the same name starring Jonathan Pryce. His second novel, Jesus and the Adman (HarperCollins), was published in 1999. His third novel, The Aftermath (Penguin), was published in April 2013 and was translated into 25 languages. The Aftermath has been made into a feature film of the same name starring Keira Knightley and Alexander Skarsgård. His fourth novel, The Killing of Butterfly Joe (Picador), was published March 2018.

His short stories have been published by The Paris Review, Punch, The New Statesman, Time Out and others; and several were broadcast on BBC Radio 4's Short Story.

His first commission for television - Mr. Harvey Lights a Candle - was broadcast in 2005 on BBC1 and starred Timothy Spall. He wrote for the BBC series Silent Witness between 2005 and 2007, and the factual drama Atlantis for BBC1 in 2008. Africa United, his first feature film (Pathé), went on general release in the UK in October 2010. He then adapted his novel The Aftermath for Scott Free. The film went on general release (through Fox Searchlight) in March 2019. He is currently adapting his fourth novel, The Killing of Butterfly Joe, for film.

He has written articles for newspapers including The Observer, The Guardian and The Daily Telegraph. In 2005, he presented Nailing The Cross, a documentary for BBC1. In 2006 he broadcast a series In the Blood for the BBC World Service, recording his family's journey through the AIDS pandemic. His book about that journey, More Than Eyes Can See, was published by Marion Boyars in 2007.

He has been a regular contributor to Radio 4's Thought for the Day since 2000. A selection of these pieces was published in March 2020 under the title Godbothering.

== Personal life ==
Brook lives with his wife and two children in London.

== Books by Rhidian Brook ==
- The Testimony of Taliesin Jones (1996)
- Jesus and the Adman (1999)
- More Than Eyes Can See: A Nine Month Journey into the Aids Pandemic (2007)
- The Aftermath (2013)
- The Killing of Butterfly Joe (2018)
- Godbothering (2020)
