= Philip F. Tyler =

Irish actor

Philip F. Tyler (15 January 1957 – 23 November 1988) was an Irish actor and television presenter.

== Background ==
Tyler, who was born in Dublin, attended St Benildus College, where he starred in the school's first stage play. He completed his Leaving Certificate in 1974.

== Career ==
Tyler was known for his work as a presenter on the Irish children's television show Bosco. He also featured in the 1980 BAC Films movie Criminal Conversation alongside Deirdre Donnelly, Peter Caffrey, and Glenroe's Emmet Bergin.

Tyler was active in the Hirschfeld Centre, Dublin's first LGBT community centre. He was involved in theatre shows with prominent gay rights activists such as David Norris and Tonie Walsh.

== Personal life ==
Tyler died suddenly in London, England, on 23 November 1988. He was 31 years old. He was cremated in London on 29 November 1988.

== Filmography ==
- Bosco (1979-1982) - presenter
- Lug na Locha (1981) - Lug
- Thursday Play Date (1980) - Fergus
- Criminal Conversation (1980) - Lynch
