= Fran Dempsey =

Irish actor

Fran Dempsey is an Irish actor most famous for his playing the character of Fortycoats in Wanderly Wagon and Fortycoats & Co..

== Filmography ==
- Lapsed Catholics (TV Movie) - Jack Flynn - 1984
- Caught in a Free State (TV Mini-Series) - Tommy - 1984
- Fortycoats & Co. (TV Series) - Fortycoats
- Men of Consequence (TV Movie) - 1981
