= The Testimony of Taliesin Jones =

2000 British drama film

- Directed by: Martin Duffy
- Starring: John Paul Macleod; Jonathan Pryce
- Release date: 12 October 2000 (AFF)
- Running time: 1h 33min
- Country: United Kingdom
- Language: English

The Testimony of Taliesin Jones is a 2000 British drama film directed by Martin Duffy and starring John Paul Macleod and Jonathan Pryce. It is based on the 1996 novel of the same name by Rhidian Brook.

== Cast ==
- John Paul Macleod – Taliesin Jones
- Jonathan Pryce – Tal's Dad
- Geraldine James – Tal's Mum
- Matthew Rhys – Jonathan
- Robert Pugh – Handycott

== Reception ==
On the review aggregator website Rotten Tomatoes, 56% of 9 critics' reviews are positive, with an average rating of 5.7/10.

In his review for Film Threat, Mark Bell said that "far from spewing the fire and brimstone propaganda of the newly indoctrinated, this calmly affirming film explores one of life’s universal mysteries".
