= Marian Richardson =

Irish television and radio presenter and producer (born 1954)

Marian Concepta Richardson (born 20 March 1954) is an Irish television and radio presenter and producer.

== Background ==
Richardson grew up in Dublin with her sisters Barbara and Helen and brother Seán. She attended school at St Louis High School, Rathmines.

== Career ==
Richardson began acting when she was 10. At the age of 13, she performed in A Christmas Carol at the Gate Theatre. In 1968, she played Hedvig Ekdal in an RTÉ television production of Henrik Ibsen's The Wild Duck with Ann Rowan, Christopher Casson, T. P. McKenna, Blánaid Irvine, Geoffrey Golden and Maurice Good.

She worked for a period as a waitress in Captain America's on Grafton Street. In the 1970s, she moved to London, working as a freelance journalist for the BBC. After returning to Ireland, she presented the popular children's television series Bosco on Raidió Teilifís Éireann for 12 years. She then moved to radio, presenting Toss The Feathers on the newly-launched 2FM. She later worked on Morning Ireland, RTÉ News at One, and the television desk.

She produced the RTÉ Radio 1 news and current affairs shows Drivetime and Today with Pat Kenny. From 2010 to 2019, she presented the compilation show Playback on RTÉ Radio 1. She has won several PPI Radio Awards. After 40 years with RTÉ, she reached the mandatory retirement age of 65 and retired on 14 March 2019.

== Personal life ==
Richardson is married to Michael Good, a fellow RTÉ employee. They live in Dún Laoghaire. Richardson has a son from a previous relationship, Fionn Comerford, who was born during her time in London. With Michael Good, she has a son, Jack. Michael has 2 sons, Peter and Richard, from a previous relationship. Richardson is a Gaeilgeoir (Irish speaker). Richardson suffers from osteoarthritis.
