= Mr Harvey Lights a Candle =

2005 British television film

Mr Harvey Lights a Candle is a television drama, written by Rhidian Brook and directed by Susanna White, that originally aired on 26 March 2005 on BBC.

== Plot ==
Mr Harvey Lights a Candle tells the story of a school outing, with a bunch of uncontrollable fifth-formers and three teachers from a London comprehensive school, to Salisbury Cathedral. The children show no interest in the purpose of the trip, and are even indifferent towards a view of Stonehenge which they pass on the way: "a boring pile of stones... perhaps we could sell it". The pupils even get more excited by all the things on offer at a motorway service station they stop at on the way.

The teacher behind the trip, a plump, middle-aged and reticent Mr Harvey, prepares fact sheets about the cathedral for the pupils, but even the other two teachers (Miss Davies, played by, and Mr Cole, played by Ben Miles) see little point in the trip. The bunch of kids is a cross-section of multi-cultural London. Two particular outsiders are a Muslim boy and a pretty-yet-vain girl, who turns out to have little self-esteem, letting boys have sex with her and self-injuring by cutting.

It transpires that Mr Harvey organised the trip to coincide with the 21st anniversary of his last trip to the cathedral, the day when he proposed to the woman who became his wife. He carries in his wallet a fading photo of the very moment when they got engaged. One of the boys steals his wallet. Helen takes the photo from the wallet, defaces the photo and passes it around the coach for the other pupils to see, to their amusement. Mr Harvey suspects that one of the pupils had stolen his wallet, but doesn't know who, and confronts Helen, grabbing her and revealing her cut wrists.

When the group finally arrives at Salisbury Cathedral, and the pupils have exited the coach, Mr Harvey finds the photo – now defaced. He is beside himself with grief and rage. But once inside the cathedral, instead of the expected tour of the building, Mr Harvey tells the pupils about how his wife had killed herself a year after they had married.

The pupils are silenced by his story: he has come to terms with his past during the trip, as well as opening up to his colleagues and pupils about the events which had a profound effect on his life.
