= Virginia Cole =

Irish actress (c.1947–2018)

- Born: Virginia Violet Cole
- Died: 8 November 2018; Rathmines, Dublin

Virginia Cole (c. 1947–8 November 2018), was an Irish actress who appeared in several of Ireland's iconic tv shows and films, famous for playing Slightly Bonkers in Fortycoats and Co.

== Biography ==
Cole was seventeen when her acting career began in earnest with the part of Concepta Feeney in Tolka Row. From there she appeared in almost every iconic Irish tv show and film including Wanderly Wagon, The Irish R.M., The Clinic, The Snapper, and Agnes Browne. She also performed on stage in a variety of plays and took some of her shows to RTÉ Radio Drama. Cole had one daughter Lucy and son Justin with her then husband John McColgan. She later became a barrister in Dublin. She died of cancer in 2018.
