= Wanderly Wagon =

- Title card (1979)
- Genre: Children's television, science fiction, fantasy
- Created by: Eugene Lambert; Don Lennox
- Starring: Bill Golding; Eugene Lambert; Nora O'Mahoney; Fran Dempsey; Frank Kelly
- Voices of: Frank Kelly
- Composer: Jim Doherty
- Country of origin: Ireland
- Original languages: English, Irish

Production
- Producers: John Lynch; Tom McArdle

Original release
- Network: RTÉ
- Release: 30 September 1967 – 1982

Related
- Fortycoats & Co.

Wanderly Wagon is an Irish children's television series which aired on RTÉ from Saturday 30 September 1967 until 1982.

== Plot ==
Wanderly Wagon followed human and puppet characters as they travelled around Ireland visiting interesting locations, rescuing princesses and generally doing good. The original premise of the show expanded to follow the characters to magical lands of Irish mythology, and into outer space. The Wagon could fly; chroma key effects were used to show it hovering in mid-air, landing in various magical lands, and even traveling underwater.

== Characters ==
- Rory - originally the lead character. Played by stage actor Bill Golding. Golding left the series in its middle years.
- O'Brien - a bumbler played by Eugene Lambert, who was also the puppeteer and ventriloquist for some of the animal characters. Other voices were provided by puppeteer members of the Lambert family.
- Godmother - a sensible mother-figure played by Nora O'Mahoney.
- Judge - a dog. He was the voice of reason and good sense, a moral conscience to the rest of them (he also starred in television road safety advertisements). To this day, Judge is held in great affection by people who remember him - many of whom can still sing his song, "I Am the Flying Dog"
- Fortycoats - a gruff, bearded character in a costume made of ragged swatches of many different materials, he owned a flying sweetshop. An occasional character who later had an eponymous spin-off show. Originally played by Bill Golding and later by Fran Dempsey.
- Mr Crow - a crow who lived in a cuckoo clock. Crow was a sarcastic fellow with a cutting sense of humour.
- Foxy - a fox who lived in a barrel on the side of the wagon and spoke with an American gangster style accent.
- Doctor Astro - a recurring villain played by Frank Kelly
- Sneaky Snake - Doctor Astro's sidekick, also voiced by Frank Kelly
- Maeve the Witch - a mischievous witch, whose attempts at villainy always ended in failure
- moon mice - four mice who lived in the attic.
- squirrels - two squirrels played by Miriam Lambert.

== Production ==
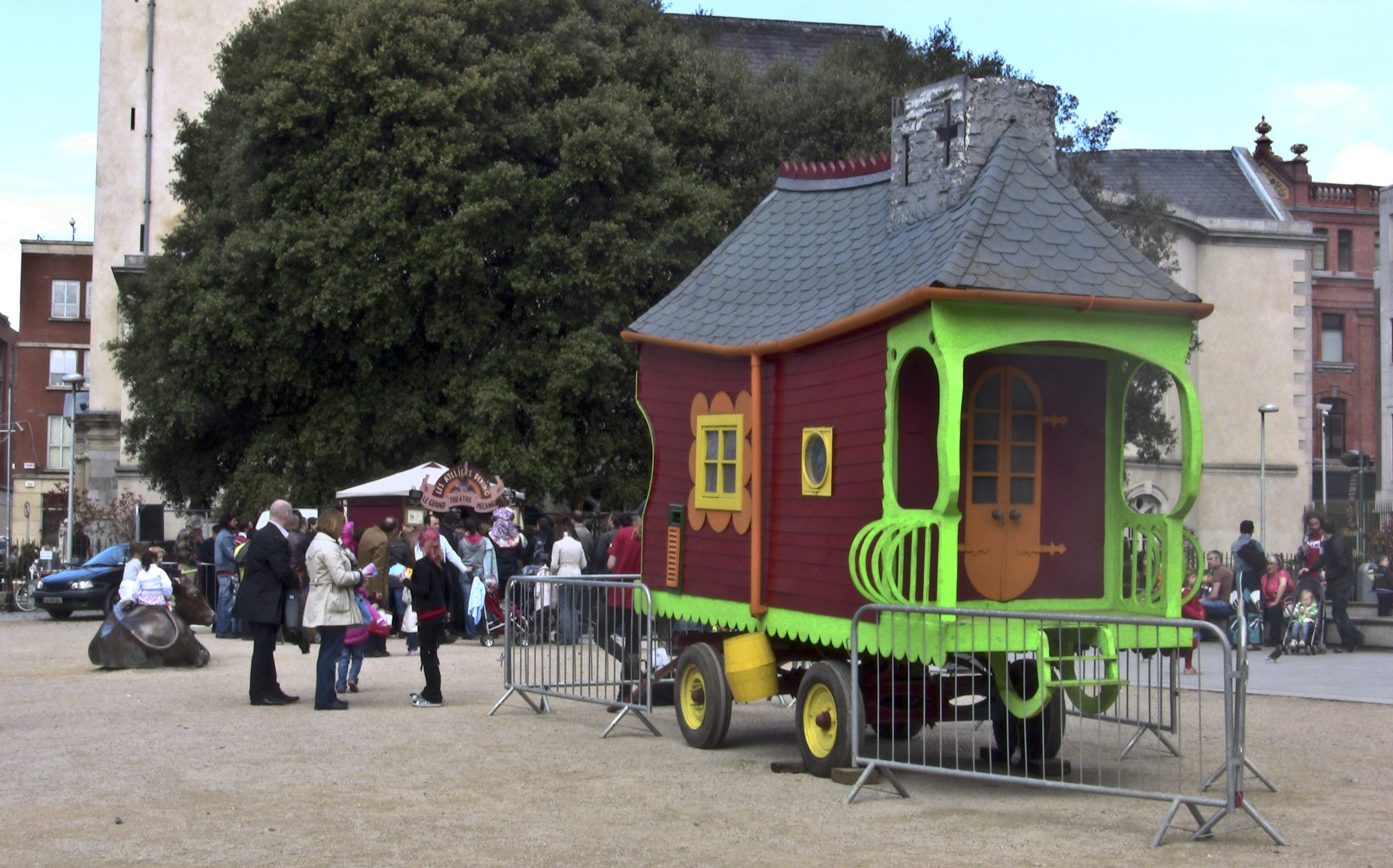
The Wanderly Wagon in 2010

Don Lennox and Eugene Lambert came up with the idea of Wanderly Wagon along with Jim O'Hare. O'Hare was recalling a recent family holiday spent on a horse-drawn caravan in County Cork. Lennox became the first producer of Wanderly Wagon, and O'Hare designed the wagon and the show's costumes.

In the early years of the show, each episode was recorded live, and as such there was no editing. If there was a mistake, it would either have to be left in or the whole episode would have to begin shooting again from the start. In addition, boom mics were not in use and each actor had to be fitted with a hidden microphone on a trailing wire, which restricted movement around the set.

Various episodes were written by Neil Jordan, Carolyn Swift, Pat Ingoldsby, Martin Duffy and Frank Kelly, who also played several characters on the show.

The series developed a tradition of transmitting a Christmas Day show from a Dublin children's hospital every year. The original Wanderly Wagon used in the making of the show is on display at Tinahely Farm Shop in County Wicklow. The smaller replica of the Wanderly Wagon, used when filming the opening scenes, is on display in The Little Museum of Dublin on St. Stephen's Green in Dublin.

== Spin-offs ==
The character of Fortycoats was given his own show, Fortycoats & Co., played by Fran Dempsey. In the show Fortycoats is accompanied by two companions; Sofar Sogood (played by Conal Kearney), a prim, goody-two shoes character, and Slightly Bonkers (played by Virginia Cole), a naive schoolgirl. They travelled in the Flying Tuck Shop doing good, and battling the evil Whilomena the Whirligig Witch and The Pickarooney.
