= Lambert Puppet Theatre =

Former theatre and museum near Dublin, Ireland

Coordinates: 53.294534°N 6.154756°W

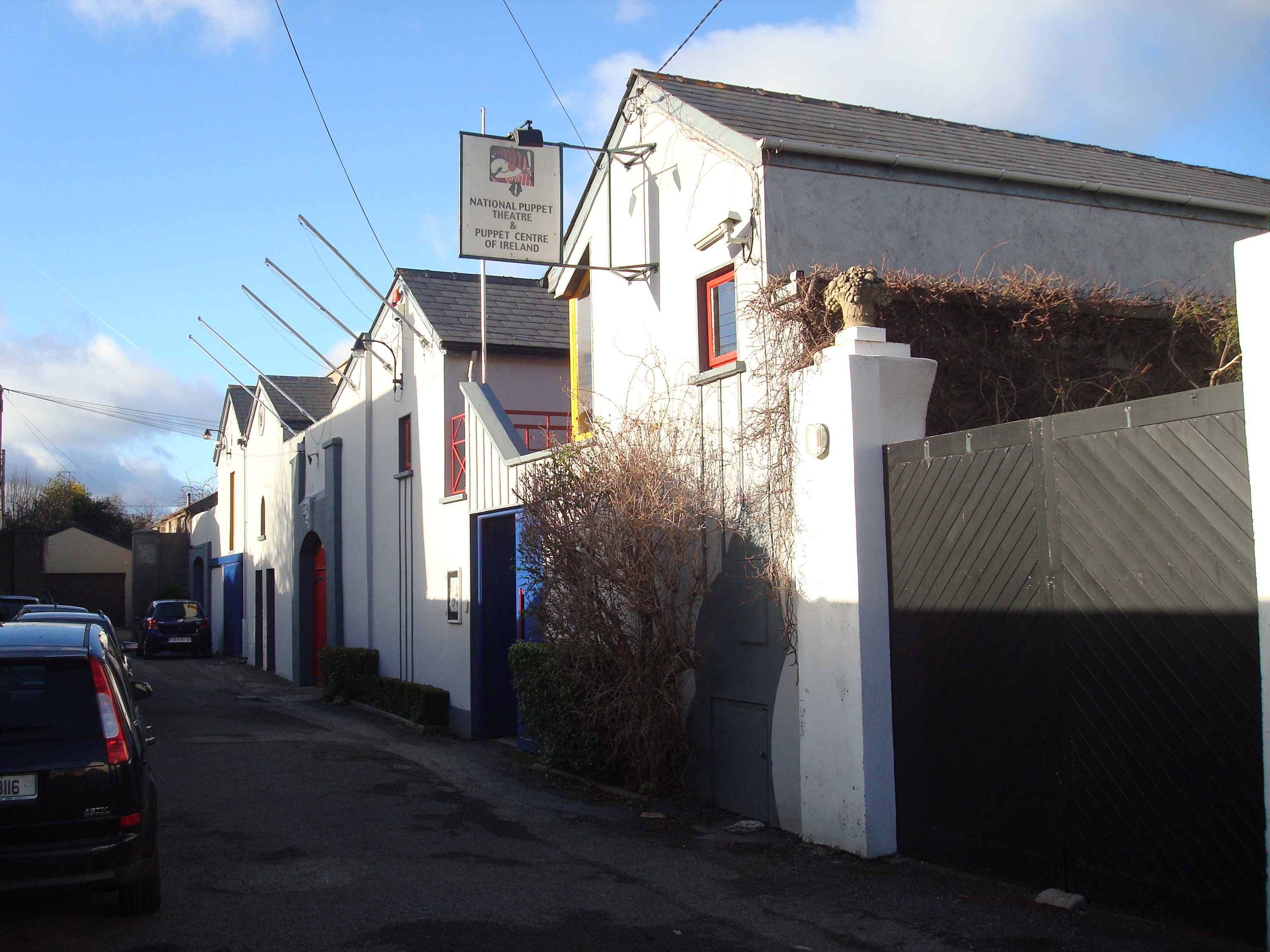
Lambert Puppet Theatre

The Lambert Puppet Theatre & Museum was a puppet theatre located in Monkstown, Dublin, Ireland. It was a family-run business established in 1972 by Eugene Lambert, and hosted an international puppet festival annually. It produced children's television series on Radio Telefís Éireann such as Wanderly Wagon.

After the death of Eugene Lambert in 2010, the theatre was run by his son, Liam. On 28 August 2015 the building was badly damaged in an arson attack, which caused damage with a cost in excess of €150,000.

On 13 November 2015, the theatre re-opened to the public with re-built puppets, for the Christmas performance of Aladdin, however this re-opening was not to last, and it closed permanently in 2018.
