= Bosco (TV series) =

Irish children's TV programme

- Bosco
- Created by: Raidió Teilifís Éireann (RTÉ)
- Starring: Bosco
- Country of origin: Ireland
- Original languages: English; Irish
- No. of episodes: 386

Production
- Running time: 25–28 minutes

Original release
- Network: RTÉ2
- Release: 4 June 1979 – 1987

Bosco is an Irish children's television programme produced during the late 1970s and 1980s. It was produced and shown by RTÉ in Ireland. The show was created by Joe O'Donnell with the puppet designed by Jan Mitchell. Bosco was voiced by Jonathan Ryan initially, in the pilot series that was broadcast, with four presenters per show, in 1979. When the show went into full-time production in 1980, with two presenters per show, Miriam Lambert took over. From the 1981 season onwards, Paula Lambert took over. Bosco's name was chosen by Helen Quinn, sister of presenter Marian Richardson.

It ran for 386 episodes, ending production in 1987. The show was continually repeated before (and later during) The Den daily until 30 September 1996, when it was replaced by The Morbegs before officially ending on 26 November 1998.

== Plot ==
The show was presented by Bosco, a small, red-haired puppet, supposedly a five-year-old child with bright red cheeks and a really squeaky voice. Bosco and the other presenters usually spoke English, but to help young children learn Irish, Bosco often peppered English speech with Irish phrases, much like the way Dora the Explorer often speaks Spanish. Bosco lived in a brightly painted wooden box (hence the name, bosca being Irish for "box"), only ever wandering far from it to go on excursions to such places as Dublin Zoo or the HB Ice Cream factory. The show also had a number of other segments.

There are various short animations, usually stop-motion, as part of the show. The Plonsters were plasticine figures, which are continually engaged in fights or schemes against each other. Faherty's Garden, created by David Byrne, starred the eponymous Faherty a dog, plagued by an amateur crow magician (Cornelius, who would often turn purple, much to his distress) in a series of shorts featuring stop-motion models. Freddy the Fox features a host of characters each with distinctive traits, such as Fiachra the Frog, Gregory Grainneog and Sile Seilide. There was also a cartoon featuring a rather strange potato family, The McSpuds, that live in a supermarket (Savers) owned by Mr McGinty. At night, the potato children, Sheila and Seamus, run amok. The Tongue Twister Twins were also regularly featured. These animations were created by Jim Quin from Thurles, County Tipperary.

The show featured arts and crafts segments which were called Make and Do, in the style of the BBC's children's programme Blue Peter. Another prominent part of the show was story-time and each show featured a song.

== Cast ==
The roster of presenters included Paul Burton, David Byrne, Peter Fitzgerald, Mary Garrioch, Susie Kennedy, Gert Kerrigan, Marcus O'Higgins, Marian Richardson (later a current affairs and radio presenter and producer at RTÉ), Jonathan Ryan, Frank Twomey (later of Bull Island), Philip F. Tyler, and Gráinne Uí Mhaitiú.

== Production ==
=== Production staff ===
- Joe O'Donnell (Creator. Series Director/Producer 1979–1980.)
- John Lynch (Series Director/Producer 1980–1982.)
- Michael Monaghan (Series Director/Producer 1982–1987.)
- Paul Barrett (Musical Director/Composer 1979–1980. Composer of the Bosco signature tune.)
- Garvan Gallagher (Musical Director/Composer 1981–1987. Producer of the 1983 album "This is Where I Live".)

== In other media ==
- In 1983, Bosco recorded an album, released on LP and cassette. Entitled "This is Where I Live (Bosco Sings!)". This reached number two on the Irish charts at Christmas 1983.
- In 1986 four children's books, written by Aidan Hickey, were published by Irish publisher Town House. These tiles included Bosco and the Letters, Bosco and the Snowman, Bosco and the Treasure, and Bosco Meets the Bears.
- Cartoon shorts, based on the books, written by Liam O'Rinn and Aidan Hickey and directed by Hickey were released in 1987. Another episode, Bosco and the Genie, was part of the series.
- A DVD containing episodes of Bosco was officially released in November 2005. This was followed up by a second DVD which was released in the run-up to Christmas 2006.
- There was also a CD released in 2006 called Bosco - Songs & Stories which featured some of Bosco's favourite songs.
- Merchandise, such as clothing (more specifically pajamas, slippers, socks and dressing gowns), tableware, and stuffed toys, were widely marketed during the lifetime of the tv series.
- For Christmas 2007, Vodafone used the theme "Bosco is back" for a seasonal campaign .
- A character named Pooka in the 2024 RTÉ One miniseries The Unreal processes a videotape of a 1980s children's TV show that was inspired by Bosco.

== Recent appearances ==
- Bosco appeared on The Late Late Toy Show 2013 with Ryan Tubridy.
- Bosco performed a tune on The Late Late Show in December 2014.
