= David Kelly (actor) =

Irish actor (1929–2012)

- Kelly in 2012
- Born: 11 July 1929; Dublin, Ireland
- Died: 12 February 2012 (aged 82); Goatstown, Dublin, Ireland
- Resting place: Mount Venus Cemetery, Rathfarnham, Dublin, Ireland
- Education: Synge Street CBS
- Alma mater: The Abbey School of Acting
- Occupation: Actor
- Years active: 1947–2009
- Notable work: Charlie and the Chocolate Factory, Waking Ned Devine, The Jigsaw Man, Stardust, Into the West
- Television: Robin's Nest, Fawlty Towers, Strumpet City, Emmerdale Farm, Glenroe
- Spouse: Laurie Morton (m. 1961)
- Children: 2
- Awards: Helen Hayes Award, Screen Actors Guild Award, Lifetime Achievement Award

David Kelly (11 July 1929 – 12 February 2012) was an Irish actor, entertainer, and dancer who had regular roles in several film and television works from the 1950s onwards. One of the most recognisable voices and faces of Irish stage and screen, he was known for his roles as Rashers Tierney in Strumpet City, Cousin Enda in Me Mammy, the builder Mr. O'Reilly in Fawlty Towers, Albert Riddle in Robin's Nest, and Grandpa Joe in the film Charlie and the Chocolate Factory (2005). Another notable role was as Michael O'Sullivan in Waking Ned.

== Early life and career ==
Kelly was born 11 July 1929 in the Rotunda Hospital, Dublin, Ireland, and educated at Dublin's Synge Street CBS Christian Brothers school. He began acting at age eight at the city's Gaiety Theatre, encouraged by a teacher at school he also performed with the Rathmines and Rathgar Musical Society and went on to train at the Abbey School of Acting.

As a backup career, Kelly additionally trained as a draughtsman and calligrapher, and also learned watercolour art. He appeared onstage in the original production of Brendan Behan's The Quare Fellow, and gained his first major career attention in Samuel Beckett's Krapp's Last Tape at the Dublin's Abbey Theatre in 1959. By then, Kelly had made his screen debut in a small part in director John Pomeroy's 1958 film noir Dublin Nightmare.

One of his first television appearances was on RTÉ in O'Dea's your Man (1964), in which Kelly played the part of Ignatius opposite Jimmy O'Dea. Kelly went on to become a familiar face on British television with the BBC comedy Me Mammy, opposite Milo O'Shea and Anna Manahan. He went on to often-memorable guest roles on such series as Oh Father! and Never Mind the Quality, Feel the Width, and particularly during the 1970s with a long-running role as the one-armed dishwasher Albert Riddle in the Man About the House spin-off Robin's Nest. Kelly also had a regular long running role alongside Bruce Forsyth in both series of the comedy Slinger's Day from 1986 to 1987, and in 1991, he appeared in the first series of the BBC sitcom 2point4 Children as the cafe-owner Paddy.

Kelly gained some of his greatest recognition in 1975, playing inept builder Mr. O'Reilly on the second episode of Fawlty Towers ("The Builders"). Kelly was also in the voice cast of The Light Princess, a partly animated, hour-long family fantasy that aired on the BBC in 1978.

In Ireland, Kelly may be most famous for his portrayal of the character "Rashers" Tierney in the 1980 RTÉ miniseries Strumpet City, which starred Peter O'Toole, Cyril Cusack and Peter Ustinov. He went on to have starring roles in television shows such as Emmerdale Farm in the 1980s and Glenroe in the 1990s, as well as playing the grandfather in Mike Newell's film Into the West (1992).

Following his appearance as Michael O'Sullivan in the 1998 film Waking Ned, Kelly played roles in such films as Tim Burton's Charlie and the Chocolate Factory (2005), in which he played Grandpa Joe, and Agent Cody Banks 2: Destination London (2004). Kelly played title character Frank Kovak in the mystery film The Kovak Box, in a rare villainous role. In 2007, he appeared in Stardust, which featured Robert De Niro and Michelle Pfeiffer, and which was also his final film. Kelly also did extensive radio work, including a guest appearance on the BBC Radio 4 series Baldi

== Later life and death ==
Kelly was married to actress Laurie Morton, who survived him, along with children David and Miriam. He died after a short illness on 12 February 2012 at age 82. The Irish Times referred to Kelly as the "grand old man of Irish acting". A Catholic funeral mass took place on 16 February at the Church of the Miraculous Medal in his hometown of Dublin. Kelly was cremated at Mount Jerome Cemetery and Crematorium.

== Awards and honours ==
Kelly won a 1991 Helen Hayes Award for Outstanding Supporting Performer, Non-Resident Production, for a Kennedy Center revival of The Playboy of the Western World. He also earned a Screen Actors Guild Award nomination for the 1998 film Waking Ned.

In 2005, Kelly won the Irish Film & Television Academy's Lifetime Achievement Award, in addition to earning a nomination for Best Supporting Actor for the film Charlie and the Chocolate Factory.

== Filmography and television ==
- The Wrong Man (1956) – Policeman (uncredited)
- Dublin Nightmare (1958) – 1st Customer
- The Quare Fellow (1962) – Reception Clerk
- Girl with Green Eyes (1964) – ticket collector
- Young Cassidy (1965) – O'Brien
- Ulysses (1967) – Garrett Deasy
- Me Mammy (1968–71) – Cousin Enda
- The Italian Job (1969) – Vicar (funeral scene)
- Quackser Fortune Has a Cousin in the Bronx (1970) – Tom Maguire
- The McKenzie Break (1970) – Adjutant (uncredited)
- Tales From the Lazy Acre (1972) – Dead Man
- Never Mind the Quality, Feel the Width (1973) – Murphy
- Hair Today, Gone Tomorrow (1973) – Hugo Mooney
- Fawlty Towers (1975) – O'Reilly (episode "The Builders")
- Philadelphia, Here I Come! (1975) – Canon O'Byrne
- The Next Man (1976) – Chauffeur in Ireland
- The Purple Taxi (1977) – Little Person
- A Portrait of the Artist as a Young Man (1977) – Dean of Studies
- Citizen Smith (1978) – Paddy
- Robin's Nest (1977–1981) – Albert Riddle
- Cowboys (1980–1981) – Wobbly Ron
- Strumpet City (1980) – Rashers Tierney
- Whoops Apocalypse (1982) – Abdab
- The Hunchback of Notre Dame (1982) – Tavernkeeper
- The Jigsaw Man (1983) – Cameron
- Red Monarch (1983) – Sergo
- Glenroe (1983) – Sylvie Dolan
- Anne Devlin (1984) – Dr. Trevor
- Stryker's War (1985)
- Slinger's Day (1986) – Fred
- Pirates (1986) – Ship's Surgeon
- Joyriders (1988) – Daniel
- Into the West (1992) – Grandfather Reilly
- Tales of the Tooth Fairies (1992) – Arthur (voice)
- A Man of No Importance (1994) – Christy Ward
- Moondance (1994) – Mr Dunwoody
- The Run of the Country (1995) – Father Gaynor
- Upwardly Mobile (1995–1997) – Barman
- The Matchmaker (1997) – O'Connor
- Heartbeat (1997) – Pa Deighton
- Waking Ned (1998) – Michael O'Sullivan
- Ballykissangel (1998) – Mr O'Reilly
- Ordinary Decent Criminal (2000) – Fr Grogan
- Greenfingers (2000) – Fergus Wilks
- Rough for Theatre I (2000) – A
- Mean Machine (2001) – Doc
- Puckoon (2002) – O'Toole
- Mystics (2003) – Dave
- Agent Cody Banks 2: Destination London (2004) – Trival
- Laws of Attraction (2004) – Priest / Michael
- The Calcium Kid (2004) – Paddy O'Flannagan
- Charlie and the Chocolate Factory (2005) – Grandpa Joe
- The Kovak Box (2006) – Frank Kovak
- Conversations with God (2006) – Job Interviewer
- Who's Your Caddy? (2007) – Robert "Bobby" Hawkins
- Stardust (2007) – Guard at The Wall
