= Denise Manahan-Vaughan =

Irish neuroscientist and neurophysiologist

Denise Manahan-Vaughan (born 17 May 1965) is an Irish neuroscientist and neurophysiologist. She is head of the Department of Neurophysiology, dean of studies and director of the International Graduate School of Neuroscience and co-founder of the Research Department of Neuroscience (founded in 2008) of the Ruhr University Bochum. Her research focuses on elucidation of the cellular and synaptic mechanisms underlying the acquisition and long-term maintenance of associative memories. She uses a multidisciplinary approach to study how spatial experiences, sensory input, neuromodulation, or brain disease impacts on, and provide insight into, the function of the hippocampus in enabling long-term memory.

== Background and education ==
A native of Rathgar in Dublin, Ireland, she studied natural sciences at Trinity College Dublin, graduating with an honours degree, specialising in physiology in 1988. She completed a PhD in neuropharmacology/neurophysiology in 1992. In the mid-1990s she moved to Germany, working first as a research scientist at the Leibniz Institute for Neurobiology in Magdeburg, and completing a Habilitation degree in physiology at the Otto von Guericke University in 1998.

She became associate professor of physiology at the Johannes Müller Institute for Physiology at the Charité in Berlin where she established the Synaptic Plasticity Research Group. In 2003, she became professor of neuroscience at the Ruhr University Bochum, where she was head of the learning and memory research unit. At this time she also became dean of studies and director of the International Graduate School of Neuroscience.

In January 2008 she became chair of the Department of Experimental Neurophysiology and in October 2010, chair of the Department of Neurophysiology, within the medical faculty, of the Ruhr University Bochum.

She is a niece of the renowned Irish actress, Anna Manahan and of Irish civil servant Michael Manahan. The marine scientist Donal T. Manahan is her second cousin and her brother is geologist Alan P.M. Vaughan.

== Additional academic activities ==
In 2017, she became executive director of the Institute of Physiology. She is currently speaker of the Collaborative Research Consortium on Integration and Representation of Sensory Processes (SFB 874) (founded in 2010) that is funded by the German Research Foundation and speaker of the Research Department of Neuroscience of the Ruhr University Bochum. She is currently also acting head of both the departments of cellular physiology and of systems physiology of the Institute of Physiology of the Ruhr University Bochum.

In 2010 she co-founded the Mercator Research Group on the Structure of Memory with the aim of creating a novel basis for research interactions and collaborations between neuroscientists, cognitive scientists, philosophers and computational neuroscientists at the Ruhr University Bochum. This initiative that was funded by the Stiftung Mercator created a number of tenure-track professorships that focus on multidisciplinary memory research and established a 7-tesla small animal magnetic resonance imaging unit at the Ruhr University.

She is a member of the editorial board of NeuroForum and is an associate editor of both Frontiers in Behavioral Neuroscience and Frontiers in Integrative Neuroscience.

== Roles in fostering the careers of young scientists, outreach, dissemination and gender equality ==
=== Fostering early career development ===
In 2003 she co-founded the Network of European Neuroscience Schools (NENS) with the goal of optimising and increasing the international visibility of European graduate programs and graduate schools in neuroscience. NENS was integrated into the Federation of European Neuroscience Societies] in 2005. She was chairperson of Network of European Neuroscience Schools (NENS)] in the period encompassing 2005–2010. She was a member of the executive committee and Governing Council of the Federation of European Neuroscience Societies from 2005 to 2010.

From 2005 through 2010, she was also speaker of the Competence Network for Neuroscience of the German Federal State of Northrhine Westphalia (NeuroNRW). The goal of the network was to enhance ideas exchange, collaborative interactions and research visibility of neuroscientists in Northrhine Westphalia.

Since 2009 she has hosted an annual 2-day international conference on memory and cognition for the International Graduate School of Neuroscience.

=== Outreach and dissemination ===
She established and implements a variety of extensive outreach and dissemination strategies at the Ruhr University Bochum aimed at raising the awareness of school pupils, from junior school through senior school levels, to the possibility of pursuing an academic career in neuroscience and at engaging the public and stakeholders with neuroscientific research and its findings. These include Brain Day an annual event that offers lectures, interactive events and exchanges with patient representative groups, that is typically attended by over 400 members of the public, Brain Café and schools competitions.

She is a member of the executive board of RUBIN, the science outreach magazine of the Ruhr University Bochum.

In March 2019 she was elected to the Dana Alliance for Brain Initiatives.

=== Strategies to optimise gender equality in neuroscience ===
In April 2019 she founded NeuroNE^{XX}T, a digital platform aimed to raise the international visibility, networking opportunities and gender equality of female neuroscientists, at all career levels.

== Research ==
Her research focusses on characterising the role that synaptic plasticity and neural information processing plays in spatial memory and associative memory formation in the mammalian brain. Within this context she also studies the etiology and early pathogenesis of both psychosis and Alzheimer's disease. Her methodology ranges from in vivo and in vitro electrophysiological approaches, including single cell, single unit, local field potential and EEG neural signal analysis, through optogenetics, neuropharmacology, wide-field calcium imaging and trans-species cognitive studies. She has produced over 145 international scientific publications on the area of hippocampal function and memory encoding in the mammalian brain. Her findings with regard to the role of hippocampal long-term depression in memory processing have contributed to a revised understanding as to how synaptic plasticity may contribute to information encoding and memory.

== Selected works ==
=== Books ===
- Manahan-Vaughan D, ed. (2018). Handbook of Neural Plasticity Techniques: a systems neuroscience approach to the neural basis of memory and cognition. Elsevier. ISBN 978-0-12-812028-6.

=== Book articles ===
- Manahan-Vaughan D (2018). "Item Encoding through hippocampal long-term potentiation and long-term depression.". In Ennaceur A, de Souza Silva MA (eds.). Handbook of Object Novelty Recognition. Elsevier. ISBN 978-0-12-812012-5.
- Manahan-Vaughan D (2017). "Learning-Related Hippocampal Long-Term Potentiation and Long-Term Depression". Learning and Memory: A Comprehensive Reference. pp. 585–609. doi:10.1016/B978-0-12-809324-5.21104-8. ISBN 978-0-12-805291-4.
- Hagena H, Manahan-Vaughan D (2017). "MGlu5: A Metabotropic Glutamate Receptor at the Hub of Hippocampal Information Processing, Persistent Synaptic Plasticity, and Long-Term Memory". MGLU Receptors. pp. 79–101. doi:10.1007/978-3-319-56170-7_5. ISBN 978-3-319-56168-4.

=== Journal articles ===
- Manahan-Vaughan D, Braunewell KH (July 1999). "Novelty acquisition is associated with induction of hippocampal long-term depression". Proceedings of the National Academy of Sciences of the United States of America. 96 (15): 8739–44. Bibcode:1999PNAS...96.8739M. doi:10.1073/pnas.96.15.8739. PMC 17586. PMID 10411945.
- Kemp A, Manahan-Vaughan D (May 2004). "Hippocampal long-term depression and long-term potentiation encode different aspects of novelty acquisition". Proceedings of the National Academy of Sciences of the United States of America. 101 (21): 8192–7. Bibcode:2004PNAS..101.8192K. doi:10.1073/pnas.0402650101. PMC 419579. PMID 15150407.
- Kemp A, Manahan-Vaughan D (July 2005). "The 5-hydroxytryptamine4 receptor exhibits frequency-dependent properties in synaptic plasticity and behavioural metaplasticity in the hippocampal CA1 region in vivo". Cerebral Cortex. 15 (7): 1037–43. doi:10.1093/cercor/bhh204. PMID 15537670.
- Lemon N, Manahan-Vaughan D (July 2006). "Dopamine D1/D5 receptors gate the acquisition of novel information through hippocampal long-term potentiation and long-term depression". The Journal of Neuroscience. 26 (29): 7723–9. doi:10.1523/JNEUROSCI.1454-06.2006. PMC 6674280. PMID 16855100.
- Tsanov M, Manahan-Vaughan D (August 2007). "The adult visual cortex expresses dynamic synaptic plasticity that is driven by the light/dark cycle". The Journal of Neuroscience. 27 (31): 8414–21. doi:10.1523/JNEUROSCI.1101-07.2007. PMC 6673052. PMID 17670988.
- Kemp A, Manahan-Vaughan D (April 2008). "The hippocampal CA1 region and dentate gyrus differentiate between environmental and spatial feature encoding through long-term depression". Cerebral Cortex. 18 (4): 968–77. doi:10.1093/cercor/bhm136. PMID 17702951.
- Tsanov M, Manahan-Vaughan D (June 2009). "Long-term plasticity is proportional to theta-activity". PLOS ONE. 4 (6) e5850. Bibcode:2009PLoSO...4.5850T. doi:10.1371/journal.pone.0005850. PMC 2688745. PMID 19513114.
- Popkirov SG, Manahan-Vaughan D (March 2011). "Involvement of the metabotropic glutamate receptor mGluR5 in NMDA receptor-dependent, learning-facilitated long-term depression in CA1 synapses". Cerebral Cortex. 21 (3): 501–9. doi:10.1093/cercor/bhq093. PMC 3041006. PMID 20525770.
- Hagena H, Manahan-Vaughan D (November 2011). "Learning-facilitated synaptic plasticity at CA3 mossy fiber and commissural-associational synapses reveals different roles in information processing". Cerebral Cortex. 21 (11): 2442–9. doi:10.1093/cercor/bhq271. PMC 3183418. PMID 21493717.
- Kemp A, Manahan-Vaughan D (September 2012). "Passive spatial perception facilitates the expression of persistent hippocampal long-term depression". Cereb Cortex. 22 (9): 2131–8. doi:10.1093/cercor/bhr233. PMC 3377964. PMID 21917740.
- Wiescholleck V, Manahan-Vaughan D (November 2013). "PDE4 inhibition enhances hippocampal synaptic plasticity in vivo and rescues MK801-induced impairment of long-term potentiation and object recognition memory in an animal model of psychosis". Transl Psychiatry. 2 (3): e89. doi:10.1038/tp.2012.17. PMC 3309535. PMID 22832854.
- Lemon N, Manahan-Vaughan D (September 2012). "Dopamine D1/D5 receptors contribute to de novo hippocampal LTD mediated by novel spatial exploration or locus coeruleus activity". Cerebral Cortex. 22 (9): 2131–8. doi:10.1093/cercor/bhr297. PMC 3412443. PMID 22038910.
- Wiescholleck V, Manahan-Vaughan D (March 2013). "Persistent deficits in hippocampal synaptic plasticity accompany losses of hippocampus-dependent memory in a rodent model of psychosis". Front Integr Neurosci. 23 (5): 1118–25. doi:10.3389/fnint.2013.00012. PMC 3597980. PMID 23508474.
- Goh JJ, Manahan-Vaughan D (May 2013). "Spatial object recognition enables endogenous LTD that curtails LTP in the mouse hippocampus". Cerebral Cortex. 23 (5): 1118–25. doi:10.1093/cercor/bhs089. PMC 3615348. PMID 22510536.
- Wiescholleck V, Manahan-Vaughan D (November 2013). "Long-lasting changes in hippocampal synaptic plasticity and cognition in an animal model of NMDA receptor dysfunction in psychosis". Neuropharmacology. 74: 48–58. doi:10.1016/j.neuropharm.2013.01.001. PMID 23376021. S2CID 20766610.
- Hansen N, Manahan-Vaughan D (April 2014). "Dopamine D1/D5 receptors mediate informational saliency that promotes persistent hippocampal long-term plasticity". Cerebral Cortex. 24 (4): 845–58. doi:10.1093/cercor/bhs362. PMC 3948488. PMID 23183712.
- Zhang S, Manahan-Vaughan D (November 2014). "Place field stability requires the metabotropic glutamate receptor, mGlu5". Hippocampus. 24 (11): 1330–40. doi:10.1002/hipo.22314. PMC 4280887. PMID 24910241.
- Zhang S, Manahan-Vaughan D (February 2015). "Spatial olfactory learning contributes to place field formation in the hippocampus". Cerebral Cortex. 25 (2): 423–32. doi:10.1093/cercor/bht239. PMC 4380081. PMID 24008582.
- Hagena H, Manahan-Vaughan D (March 2015). "mGlu5 acts as a switch for opposing forms of synaptic plasticity at mossy fiber-CA3 and commissural associational-CA3 synapses". The Journal of Neuroscience. 35 (12): 4999–5006. doi:10.1523/JNEUROSCI.3417-14.2015. PMC 6705373. PMID 25810529.
- Kalweit AN, Yang H, Colitti-Klausnitzer J, Fülöp L, Bozsó Z, Penke B, Manahan-Vaughan D (May 2015). "Acute intracerebral treatment with amyloid-beta (1-42) alters the profile of neuronal oscillations that accompany LTP induction and results in impaired LTP in freely behaving rats". Front Behav Neurosci. 9: 103. doi:10.3389/fnbeh.2015.00103. PMC 4422036. PMID 25999827.
- Grüter T, Wiescholleck V, Dubovyk V, Aliane V, Manahan-Vaughan D (May 2015). "Altered neuronal excitability underlies impaired hippocampal function in an animal model of psychosis". Front Behav Neurosci. 9: 117. doi:10.3389/fnbeh.2015.00117. PMC 4438226. PMID 26042007.
- Goh J, Manahan-Vaughan D (May 2015). "Role of inhibitory autophosphorylation of calcium/calmodulin-dependent kinase II (αCAMKII) in persistent (>24 h) hippocampal LTP and in LTD facilitated by novel object-place learning and recognition in mice". Behav Brain Res. 285: 79–88. doi:10.1016/j.bbr.2014.01.022. PMID 24480420. S2CID 33226338.
- Novkovic T, Shchyglo O, Gold R, Manahan-Vaughan D (November 2015). "Hippocampal function is compromised in an animal model of multiple sclerosis". Neuroscience. 309: 100–112. doi:10.1016/j.neuroscience.2015.03.008. PMID 25795599. S2CID 26755061.
- Hagena H, Hansen N, Manahan-Vaughan D (April 2016). "β-Adrenergic Control of Hippocampal Function: Subserving the Choreography of Synaptic Information Storage and Memory". Cerebral Cortex. 26 (4): 1349–64. doi:10.1093/cercor/bhv330. PMC 4785955. PMID 26804338.
- Twarkowski H, Manahan-Vaughan D (September 2016). "Loss of Catecholaminergic Neuromodulation of Persistent Forms of Hippocampal Synaptic Plasticity with Increasing Age". Front Synaptic Neurosci. 8: 30. doi:10.3389/fnsyn.2016.00030. PMC 5035743. PMID 27725799.
- Ballesteros JJ, Buschler A, Köhr G, Manahan-Vaughan D (October 2016). "Afferent Input Selects NMDA Receptor Subtype to Determine the Persistency of Hippocampal LTP in Freely Behaving Mice". Front Synaptic Neurosci. 8: 33. doi:10.3389/fnsyn.2016.00033. PMC 5073893. PMID 27818632.
- Kalweit AN, Amanpour-Gharaei B, Colitti-Klausnitzer J, Manahan-Vaughan D (March 2017). "Changes in Neuronal Oscillations Accompany the Loss of Hippocampal LTP that Occurs in an Animal Model of Psychosis". Front Behav Neurosci. 11: 36. doi:10.3389/fnbeh.2017.00036. PMC 5340772. PMID 28337131.
- Draht F, Zhang S, Rayan A, Schönfeld F, Wiskott L, Manahan-Vaughan D (June 2017). "Experience-Dependency of Reliance on Local Visual and Idiothetic Cues for Spatial Representations Created in the Absence of Distal Information". Front Behav Neurosci. 11: 92. doi:10.3389/fnbeh.2017.00092. PMC 5459891. PMID 28634444.
- Hoang TH, Aliane V, Manahan-Vaughan D (May 2018). "Novel encoding and updating of positional, or directional, spatial cues are processed by distinct hippocampal subfields: Evidence for parallel information processing and the "what" stream". Hippocampus. 28 (5): 315–326. doi:10.1002/hipo.22833. PMC 5947642. PMID 29394518.
- Strauch C, Manahan-Vaughan D (February 2018). "In the Piriform Cortex, the Primary Impetus for Information Encoding through Synaptic Plasticity Is Provided by Descending Rather than Ascending Olfactory Inputs". Cerebral Cortex. 28 (2): 764–776. doi:10.1093/cercor/bhx315. PMID 29186359.
- Dubovyk V, Manahan-Vaughan D (February 2018). "Less means more: The magnitude of synaptic plasticity along the hippocampal dorso-ventral axis is inversely related to the expression levels of plasticity-related neurotransmitter receptors". Hippocampus. 28 (2): 136–150. doi:10.1002/hipo.22816. PMC 5814924. PMID 29171922.
- Dubovyk V, Manahan-Vaughan D (September 2018). "Time-Dependent Alterations in the Expression of NMDA Receptor Subunits along the Dorsoventral Hippocampal Axis in an Animal Model of Nascent Psychosis". ACS Chem Neurosci. 9 (9): 2241–2251. doi:10.1021/acschemneuro.8b00017. PMID 29634239.
- Feldmann M, Beckmann D, Eysel UT, Manahan-Vaughan D (February 2019). "Early Loss of Vision Results in Extensive Reorganization of Plasticity-Related Receptors and Alterations in Hippocampal Function That Extend Through Adulthood". Cerebral Cortex. 29 (2): 892–905. doi:10.1093/cercor/bhy297. PMC 6319173. PMID 30535137.
- Hauser MF, Wiescholleck V, Colitti-Klausnitzer J, Bellebaum C, Manahan-Vaughan D (March 2019). "Event-related potentials evoked by passive visuospatial perception in rats and humans reveal common denominators in information processing". Brain Struct Funct. 224 (4): 1583–1597. doi:10.1007/s00429-019-01854-4. PMC 6509088. PMID 30859292.
