= T. P. McKenna =

Irish actor (1929–2011)

- Born: Thomas Patrick McKenna; 7 September 1929; Mullagh, County Cavan, Ireland
- Died: 13 February 2011 (aged 81); Hampstead, London, England
- Occupation: Actor
- Years active: 1953–2009
- Spouse: May White (m. 1956; died 2007)
- Children: 5

Thomas Patrick McKenna (7 September 1929 – 13 February 2011) was an Irish actor. He had an extensive stage and screen career.

== Career ==
=== Early years ===
Thomas Patrick McKenna was born at Mullagh, County Cavan, Ireland, in 1929 and educated at Mullagh School and St Patrick's College, Cavan. Known from birth as 'T.P.', he was named after an uncle and his grandfather before him, he was the eldest of the ten surviving children of Raphael McKenna, an auctioneer and merchant, and his wife May. It was an American step-grandmother that would give him his first interest in acting, later at boarding school he would become a protégé of Fr. Vincent Kennedy, who featured him in the annual productions of Gilbert & Sullivan operas. He was a noted treble and sang in Cavan Cathedral, but later would also become a member of the school's Gaelic Football squad, representing St Patrick's in the final of the All Ireland colleges competition in 1948.

Despite realising from the age of fifteen that he wished to pursue a life on the stage, circumstances dictated that on leaving school in 1948, McKenna joined the Ulster Bank in Granard, Co Longford, where he worked for the next six years. Still, he remained set on becoming an actor and on being posted to Dublin, he soon made a mark on the city's amateur scene appearing with the Rathmines and Rathgar Musical Society, and the Dublin Shakespeare Society. His employers were not impressed by his extracurricular activities, and in 1954 he was posted to the remote town of Killeshandra in County Cavan. McKenna refused to go and resigned his position.

=== Stage ===
McKenna made his stage debut at the Pike Theatre in Dublin in 1953 as John Buchanan in Tennessee Williams' Summer and Smoke. He played a season at the Gaiety Theatre with Anew McMaster's Shakespearean company, and was a member of The Gas Theatre Company directed by Godfrey Quigley.

Through family contacts, McKenna sought an interview with the managing director of the Abbey Theatre, Ernest Blythe. Despite Blythe's concerns that "his nose was too long, and he would grow fat", he eventually became a permanent member of the company in 1954 and would remain there for the next eight years, performing over seventy roles.

In 1963, McKenna secured a short leave of absence to go to London (St. Martin's Theatre) with the Gate Theatre's production of Stephen D, an adaptation of Joyce's A Portrait of the Artist as a Young Man by Hugh Leonard which had been a hit of the 1962 Dublin Theatre Festival. The play was well received by the London critics, leading to offers of further other stage work there including "O'Keefe" in J. P. Donleavy's The Ginger Man (Ashcroft, Croydon), Lindsay Anderson's revival of Julius Caesar (1964) for the English Stage Company and 1965 as the Burglar (Aubrey "Popsy" Bagot) in Shaw's Too True to be Good (Garrick) opposite Alistair Sim and George Cole.

McKenna had not left the Irish stage behind entirely and would make regular appearances at the Dublin Theatre Festival in A Little Winter Love, Pull Down A Horseman, King of the Castle and Who's Afraid of Virginia Woolf?.

McKenna joined Stuart Burge's company at the Nottingham Playhouse in 1968 playing Trigorin in The Seagull and Sir Joseph Surface in Sheridan's The School For Scandal, both directed by Jonathan Miller. In 1969, he created the role of Fitzpatrick in David Storey's The Contractor directed by Lindsay Anderson at the Royal Court Theatre, London. The production later transferred to the Fortune Theatre and ran for over a year. In 1973, he took on the role of Andrew Wyke opposite his friend Donal Donnelly in the Irish premiere of Peter Shaffer's Sleuth. The production played at the Opera House, Cork, and the Olympia Theatre in Dublin, where it broke box office records.

Later that year McKenna joined the Royal Shakespeare Company and took over the role of Robert Hand in James Joyce's only play, Exiles directed by Harold Pinter. In the same season, he also appeared in a rare staging of Jean Genet's The Balcony directed by Terry Hands.

McKenna returned to the RSC in 1976 for Shaw's The Devil's Disciple, directed by Jack Gold in a production to mark the American bicentennial celebrations, as the revolutionary pastor Reverend Anthony Anderson.

In the late 1980s and 1990s, McKenna returned to the Dublin stage when he was invited by director Michael Colgan to join the Gate Theatre on a number of occasions, including admired productions of Uncle Vanya, The Cherry Orchard and No Man's Land. It was there he created the role of Dr Rice in Brian Friel's drama, Molly Sweeney (1994), and again at London's Almeida Theatre. Other Friel productions he appeared in were The Communication Cord (Hampstead Theatre, 1984) and Aristocrats (2004) at the RNT in his final stage appearance.

McKenna also directed on several occasions and had to his name productions of John Millington Synge's The Playboy of the Western World (Nottingham Playhouse, 1968), Thomas Kilroy's The Death and Resurrection of Mr Roche (Abbey Theatre, 1973) and Seán O'Casey's The Shadow of A Gunman (Crucible Theatre, Sheffield, 1980).

=== Film and television ===
During the 1960s and 1970s, McKenna appeared regularly in television dramas, including The Avengers (1964, 1965, 1968), Danger Man (1965), The Saint (1966, 1968), Adam Adamant Lives! (1967), Jason King (1972), two episodes of Thriller (1973 and 1976), The Sweeney (1975), Blake's 7 (1978), Minder (1984) and Doctor Who.

McKenna played Richmond in the Thames Television series Callan (1972) and made ten appearances in Crown Court (1974–1982), mainly as barrister Patrick Canty, while also appearing in the ATV anthology drama series Love Story (1965–1968). He also made appearances in other television dramas including The Duchess of Malfi (1972), Napoleon and Love (1974), The Changeling (1974), Holocaust (1978),The Manions of America (1981), To the Lighthouse (1983), The Scarlet and the Black (1983), Bleak House (1985), Strong Medicine (1986), The Play on One: Unreported Incident (1988), Jack the Ripper (1988), Shoot to Kill (1990), TV series Lovejoy - Irish Stew (1993), and the final episode of Inspector Morse - The Remorseful Day (2000).

McKenna had prominent film roles in Ulysses (1967), and A Portrait of the Artist As A Young Man (1977). Other film credits include The Charge of the Light Brigade (1968), Anne of the Thousand Days (1969), Perfect Friday (1970), Villain (1971), Straw Dogs (1971), All Creatures Great and Small (1975), Memed, My Hawk (1984), Pascali's Island (1988), A Caribbean Mystery (1989), Monarch (2000) and The Libertine (2004).

McKenna's performance as Henry VIII in the film Monarch was re-released in cinemas in 2014.

=== Radio and audiobooks ===
T.P. McKenna’s voice was first heard on Ireland’s Radio Eireann as Brian, the eldest son of Mrs. Kennedy Marie Kean in the twice-weekly sponsored saga, The Kennedys of Castleross (1955-1973), his on-again, off-again romance with local beauty, Pat, enthralling the nation in its first taste of a radio soap.

His British radio debut would come in 1964, reading a short story by Edna O’Brien (Are You Cracked or Are You Mad?) on the BBC Home Service, though it wouldn’t be until the 70s, once fully domiciled in London, that he would become a more regular presence on BBC Radio featuring in over forty original plays and literary adaptations, and as a reader of short stories, mostly for BBC Radio 4, but featuring also on the World Service and Radio 3 in productions directed by Piers Plowright, David Hitchinson, Cherry Cookson, Peter Kavanagh, Eoin O’Callaghan, Fanyia Williams, Ned Chaillet, Ann Mann and R.D. Smith.

These included readings for Woman’s Hour of Brown Lord of the Mountain (Walter Macken), Home Before Night (Hugh Leonard) and Three Short Stories (Sean O’Faolin); literary adaptations of The Destruction Factor (Kenneth Follett), The Seagull (Chekov trans. Kilroy), The Sea, The Sea (Iris Murdoch), Cock-a-doodle Dandy (Sean O’Casey), Miracle at Tubbernanog (Frederic Mullaly) and A Painful Case (James Joyce); and historical dramas and reconstructions - Amritsar (Colin Haydn Evans), The Putney Debates (Jack Emery), The Marches of Wales (George Baker), That Man Bracken (Thomas Kilroy) and The Music of W.B. Yeats (Ann Mann).

Among the original plays in which he featured, the work of Irish writers dominated including Maurice Leitch (Introducing Mr. Fagan, Where the Boys Are, All the Uncrowned Heads of Europe & A Shout in the Distance), William Trevor (Mr. McNamara, Events at Drimaghleen), Patrick Galvin (The Class of ’39) and Tom MacIntyre (Fine Day for a Hunt, Rise Up Lovely Sweeney).

==== Serials ====
He featured as Phonsie Doherty in the Christopher Fitz‑Simon comedy series, Ballylenon (1994-1999) and as Fr. Troy opposite David Threlfall in the radio drama Baldi (2000-2007), both for BBC Radio 4. They continue to be heard on Radio 4Extra.

==== Narration ====
Bird’s Eye View: Inis Fail, Isle of Destiny (BBC, 1971), Scope: An Oxford Elegy: Vaughan Williams/Arnold (RTE 1973), The Chester Beatty Library - where east meets west (BAC Films Ltd, 1979), Brian Friel and Field Day (RTE, 1983), Is There One Who Understands Me?: The World of James Joyce (RTE, 1983). Dear Boy: The Story of Michael Mac Liammoir (Poolbeg Productions, 1999).

==== Audiobooks ====
On CD and download he has recorded the audiobooks poetry of W. B. Yeats, Joyce's short story collection Dubliners and Somerville and Ross's Tales of an Irish R.M.

=== Awards and honours ===
- Honorary Life Member of the Abbey Theatre Company (1966)
- Actor of the Year, Evening Herald: Who’s Afraid of Virginia Woolf (George), Olympia Theatre, 1966
- First Prize Short Fiction Category - Chicago International Film Festival 1978 A Child's Voice (Ainsley Rupert MacReadie), BAC Films Ltd
- Emmy Award for Outstanding Limited Series: Holocaust (Paul Blobel), NBC, 1978
- 'Irish Post' Community Award 1978
- International Emmy Awards, Best Documentary: The World of James Joyce: Is there one who understands me? (Narrator), RTE 1982
- Broadcasting Press Guild Awards 1990, Best Single Drama / Royal Television Society Awards, Best Single Drama (1991):Shoot to Kill (Sir John Hermon), YTV 1990

== Personal life ==
McKenna was married to May White from 1956 until her death in 2007. They had five children. His sons, Kilian McKenna and Breffni McKenna followed him into the profession.

== Death ==
McKenna died on 13 February 2011 at the Royal Free Hospital in Hampstead, London, at the age of 81 following a long period of illness. He was buried alongside his wife at Teampall Cheallaigh Cemetery in his native County Cavan.

Following McKenna's death, tributes were paid by President of Ireland Mary McAleese, Prince Charles, and Ireland's Culture Minister Mary Hanafin, who said that McKenna was "one of a great generation whose talents on the screen and stage both at home and abroad gave us all great pride in his accomplishments". In County Cavan, he is commemorated by the T. P. McKenna Drama Scholarships (VEC) and the T. P. McKenna Perpetual Trophy presented as part of the Millrace Annual Drama Festival.

== Selected filmography ==
- 1959 Broth of a Boy as Holmes
- 1959 Home Is the Hero as Young Man At Dance
- 1959 Shake Hands with the Devil as Unknown (uncredited)
- 1960 A Terrible Beauty as A McIntyre Boy (uncredited)
- 1960 The Siege of Sidney Street as Lapidos
- 1960 Das schwarze Schaf as (uncredited)
- 1961 Freedom to Die as Mike
- 1961 Johnny Nobody as Officer Garda
- 1964 Girl with Green Eyes as The Priest
- 1964 Ferry Cross the Mersey as Jack Hanson
- 1964 Downfall as Martin Somers
- 1965 Young Cassidy as Tom
- 1967 Ulysses as Buck Mulligan
- 1968 The Charge of the Light Brigade as William Russell
- 1969 Anne of the Thousand Days as Sir Henry Norris
- 1970 The Beast in the Cellar Chief Superintendent Paddick
- 1970 The Fifth Day of Peace as Nick
- 1970 Perfect Friday as Smith
- 1971 Straw Dogs Major John Scott
- 1971 Villain as Frank Fletcher
- 1971 Percy as Meet The People Compere
- 1973 A Warm December as Minor Role (uncredited)
- 1974 Percy's Progress as London News Editor
- 1975 All Creatures Great and Small as Soames
- 1975 Looking for Clancy as Marcus Selby
- 1977 A Portrait of the Artist as a Young Man as Simon Dedalus
- 1978 Holocaust as Paul Blobel
- 1980 Lady Killers as Hardinge Giffard
- 1980 The Outsider as John Russell
- 1980 Silver Dream Racer as Bank Manager
- 1981 Levkas Man as Holroyd
- 1982 Britannia Hospital as Theatre Surgeon
- 1984 Kurtuluş, TRT as Lloyd George
- 1984 Memed, My Hawk as Dursan
- 1985 The Doctor and the Devils as O'Connor
- 1988 The Play on One: Unreported Incident as Michael Flynn
- 1988 Pascali's Island as Dr. Hogan
- 1988 Jack the Ripper as O'Connor
- 1988 Red Scorpion as General Oleg Vortek
- 1989 Valmont as Baron
- 2000 Monarch as Henry VIII
- 2000 Longitude as Edmund Burke
- 2002 The Boys from County Clare as The Announcer
- 2004 The Libertine as Black Rod
