= Alan Simpson (theatre director) =

Irish theatre director (1921–1980)

Alan Simpson (1921–1980) was an Irish theatre director.

Simpson was born in Dublin, Ireland and was the son of Walter Simpson, a Church of Ireland clergyman. He was called up to the army in 1941. In 1945 he transferred onto the army reserve and joined the Gate Theatre, Dublin as stage manager.

== Career ==
In 1953 Simpson co-founded the Pike Theatre along with his wife Carolyn Swift. On November 19, 1954, Simpson staged the first ever production of The Quare Fellow by Brendan Behan, and, in 1955, he mounted the first Irish production of Samuel Beckett's Waiting for Godot, which went on to become one of the longest-running productions in Ireland up until that time. In 1957 he staged Tennessee Williams' The Rose Tattoo during the first International Dublin Theatre Festival. Despite being hugely successful and receiving positive reviews from both Irish and English critics, the production sparked controversy when a member of the audience claimed to have seen a contraceptive produced during the performance. Simpson was arrested on May 21, 1957 on a charge of producing an indecent and profane performance for gain and was incarcerated for one night at Bridewell. Despite the court case dragging on for the next year, Simpson was eventually discharged. However, the costly legal proceedings had a devastating impact on Simpson both financially and personally and eventually led to the closure of the Pike theatre in 1960. After his marriage to Swift broke down in 1961, he worked in several theatre productions in England and Scotland, after which he was hired as artistic adviser to the Abbey Theatre on a ten-month contract in 1968. Between 1969 and 1976 he directed numerous productions including The Hard life, She Stoops to Conquer, The Quare Fellow and others. He also staged in several musicals such as Jesus Christ Superstar in 1973 and Joseph and the amazing technicolor dreamcoat at the Gaiety Theatre. He later moved to the United States of America where he lectured at New York State University in 1978 and directed Androcles and the lion by George Bernard Shaw.

Simpson divorced his first wife, Carolyn Swift. He then married Irish actress, Eileen Colgan. Simpson and Colgan remained together until his death in 1980.
