= Rosaleen Linehan =

Irish actress

- Born: Rosaleen Philomena McMenamin; 1 June 1937 (age 89); Dublin, Ireland
- Occupation: Actress
- Spouse: Fergus Linehan (died 2016)
- Children: 4
- Parent: Daniel McMenamin

Rosaleen Philomena Linehan (née McMenamin; born 1 June 1937) is an Irish stage, screen, and television actress.

== Early life and education ==
Linehan was born in Dublin to a mother from Belfast and a father from East Donegal. Both her parents were older when she was born: her mother in her late 40s and her father in his 50s.

She attended University College Dublin and graduated in 1957 with a Bachelor of Arts degree in Economics and Politics. She joined UCD Dramsoc on her first day of college and started acting professionally within two years of leaving the university.

== Career ==
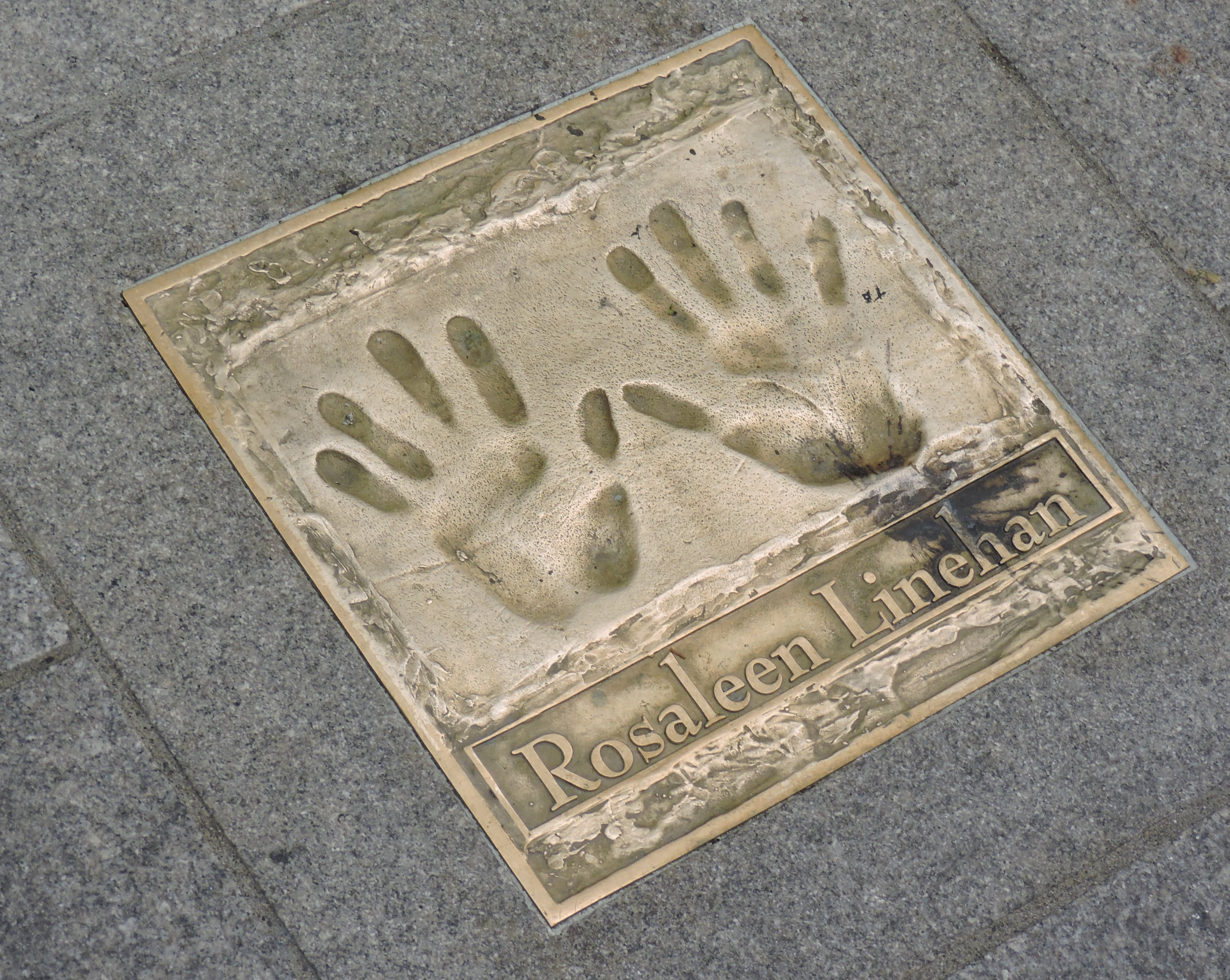
Rosaleen Linehan handprints (Gaiety Theatre, Dublin)

Linehan began her acting career appearing in comedy revues she co-wrote with her husband, Fergus Linehan. Initially known solely as a singer and comedian, Linehan began pursuing more serious roles in the early 1980s, encouraged by playwrights who offered her new roles in support of this shift.

She has appeared on stage in plays including Blithe Spirit, The House of Bernarda Alba, The Seagull, andTwelfth Night, in which she "gave a mesmeric performance as Feste, the clown, [evoking] an ashen melancholoy".

She was nominated for Best Featured Actress in a Play for her role as Kate in Brian Friel's Dancing at Lughnasa at the 1992 Tony Awards. She starred as Winnie in Samuel Beckett's Happy Days on stage in 1996 opposite Barry McGovern and later on screen as part of the Beckett on Film project.

In 1972, Linehan won a Jacob's Award for her RTÉ Radio comedy series Get an Earful of This.

In film, she has appeared as Nurse Callan in Ulysses, May Dedalus in A Portrait of the Artist as a Young Man, Aunt Fitzeustace in Fools of Fortune, Mrs. Canning in The Butcher Boy, Peggy Owens in About Adam, Mrs Matson in The Hi-Lo Country, and Millie O'Dowd in The Matchmaker.

On television, she played Bess Nugent in Sharpe's Gold, a voice artist on the Irish language children's TV series Inis Cúil in 2005 and appeared in Hugh Leonard's BBC sitcom Me Mammy. More recently, she played Deirdre O'Kane's mother in BitterSweet.

She was the recipient of the Lifetime Achievement Award at the Irish Theatre Awards in 2008. In 2014, she was awarded the UCD Alumni Award for Arts.

== Personal life ==
Linehan's father, Daniel McMenamin, was a Teachta Dála for Donegal from 1927 to 1961.

Linehan was married to Fergus Linehan, who died in 2016, with whom she had four children and eight grandchildren. Linehan lives in County Dublin.

== Filmography ==
=== Film performances ===
| Year | Title | Role | Notes |
|---|---|---|---|
| 1967 | Ulysses | Nurse Callan | |
| 1977 | A Portrait of the Artist as a Young Man | May Dedalus | |
| 1990 | Fools of Fortune | Aunt Fitzeustace | |
| 1990 | All My Lovely Boys | | Short film |
| 1993 | The Saint of Fort Washington | Rosie | |
| 1996 | Snakes and Ladders | Nora | |
| 1997 | The Butcher Boy | Mrs. Canning | |
| 1997 | The MatchMaker | Millie O'Dowd | |
| 1998 | The Hi-Lo Country | Mrs. Matson | |
| 2000 | About Adam | Peggy Owens | |
| 2000 | Mad About Mambo | Mrs. Burns | |
| 2000 | Conamara | Aine | In German and English |
| 2013 | Flat Lake | Mrs. O'Malley | |
| 2016 | Ernestine & Kit | Kit | Short film |
| 2017 | Hedgehog Hootenanny | Narrator | Short film |
| 2019 | The Ferry | Mrs. O'Toole | Short film |
| 2019 | The Personal History of David Copperfield | Mrs. Gummidge | |
| 2021 | Touch | | Short film, voice role |
| 2023 | A Greyhound of a Girl | Emer | Voice role |
| 2024 | A Lady of Paris | Lily | Short film |

=== Television performances ===
| Year | Title | Role | Notes |
|---|---|---|---|
| 1968 | The Jazz Age | Kitty | 1 episode |
| 1970–71 | Me Mammy | Chrissie | 3 episodes |
| 1973 | Black and Blue | Alice | 1 episode |
| 1985 | A Night of the Campaign | Mrs. Watson | TV movie |
| 1992 | Hostages | Brenda Gilham | TV movie |
| 1993 | Remember | Sheila | TV movie |
| 1993 | Great Performances | Sister Felicity | 1 episode: Suddenly, Last Summer |
| 1994 | Grushko | Lena | 3 episodes |
| 1994 | Scarlett | Mrs. Fitzpatrick | 3 episodes |
| 1995 | Sharpe's Gold | Bess Nugent | 1 episode |
| 2000 | Happy Days | Winnie | TV movie. Reprisal of stage role. |
| 2005–06 | The Island of Inis Cool | Mrs. O'Malley | Animation. Permanent cast member. |
| 2008 | BitterSweet | Teresa | |
| 2014 | Moone Boy | Mourning Woman | 1 episode |
| 2024 | The Hardacres | Duchess of Harrogate | 1 episode |

== Theater ==
=== Stage performances (selected) ===
| Year | Title | Role | Notes |
|---|---|---|---|
| 1991 | Dancing at Lughnasa | Kate | Nominated as Best Actress (Featured Role - Play) for the 1992 Tony Awards. Playwright Brien Friel, director Patrick Mason. Performed at the Phoenix Theater, London. |
| 1994 | Mother of All the Behans | Kathleen Behan | Author credit for providing additional material to the adaptaion in her solo role. Performed at the Assembly Rooms on the Edinburgh Fringe and at Theatre for the New City, New York. |
| 1996 | Happy Days | Winnie | Performed at Gate Theatre, Dublin. Later reprised role in a 2000 film production. |
| 1998 | Twelfth Night | Feste | |
| 2002 | Gates of Gold | Kassie | Playwright Frank McGuinness. Performed at Gate Theater, Dublin. |
| 2003 | Tartuffe | Madame Pernelle | Performed at American Airlines Theater, New York City. |
| 2005 | Blood Wedding | Bridegroom's Mother | Playwright Federíco García Lorca. Performed at Almeida Theatre, London, with a cast that included Gael Garcia Bernal. |
| 2008 | The New Electric Ballroom | Breda | Playwright Enda Walsh. |
| 2019 | The Cripple of Inishmaan | Mammy | Playwright Martin McDonagh |
| 2021 | Backwards up a Rainbow | | Also featured songs composed by Linehan as well as husband, Fergus, and son, Conor. |
