= Rathmines and Rathgar Musical Society =

Irish amateur music society in Dublin

Rathmines and Rathgar Musical Society, known as the R&R, is an amateur musical society founded in 1913 in the Rathmines and Rathgar, area of Dublin. They have hosted performances in venues such as the Gaiety Theatre, Dublin and the National Concert Hall. They produce two musicals each year. Among their productions over the years have been Gilbert and Sullivan operas The Mikado (which was their first production in 1913), Pirates of Penzance, Gondoliers, and musicals such as My Fair Lady, The Merry Widow, The Producers, and Fiddler on the Roof. The controversial industrialist William Martin Murphy served as the society's first president.

Among those who have performed with the society include David Kelly, Terry Wogan and T. P. McKenna.

The Society presents the Senior Musical Prize at the Feis Ceoil.

If You Want to Know Who We Are: The Rathmines & Rathgar Musical Society 1913–2013 was written by broadcaster Myles Dungan to celebrate the society's centenary in 2013.
