= The Rose Tattoo =

Play by Tennessee Williams

- First edition cover (New Directions)
- Original language: English
- Written by: Tennessee Williams
- Characters: Serafina Delle Rose; Alvaro Mangiacavallo; Man; The Strega; Father De Leo; Doctor; Teresa; Flora; Salesman; Miss Yorke; Rosa Delle Rose; Peppina; Salvatore
- Genre: Drama
- Setting: Gulf Coast village between New Orleans and Mobile

Premiere
- Date: 3 February 1951
- Place: Martin Beck Theatre

The Rose Tattoo is a three-act play written by Tennessee Williams in 1949 and 1950; after its Chicago premiere on December 29, 1950, he made further revisions to the play for its Broadway premiere on February 2, 1951, and its publication by New Directions the following month. A film adaptation was released in 1955. The Rose Tattoo tells the story of an Italian-American widow in Mississippi who has withdrawn from the world after her husband's death and expects her daughter to do the same.

The setting is a place in proximity to Biloxi. Jacob Adler stated that the story is disconnected from the culture of the Southern United States as the plot "has almost no Southern connections".

== Background ==
People originating in Sicily in real life became involved in the fruit industry in the area around New Orleans in the late 1800s, and according to Robert Rea, the playwright had a friend named Marion Black Vaccaro and that the playwright "likely" was aware of how the Vaccaro brothers created their fruit business via said friend.

== Productions ==
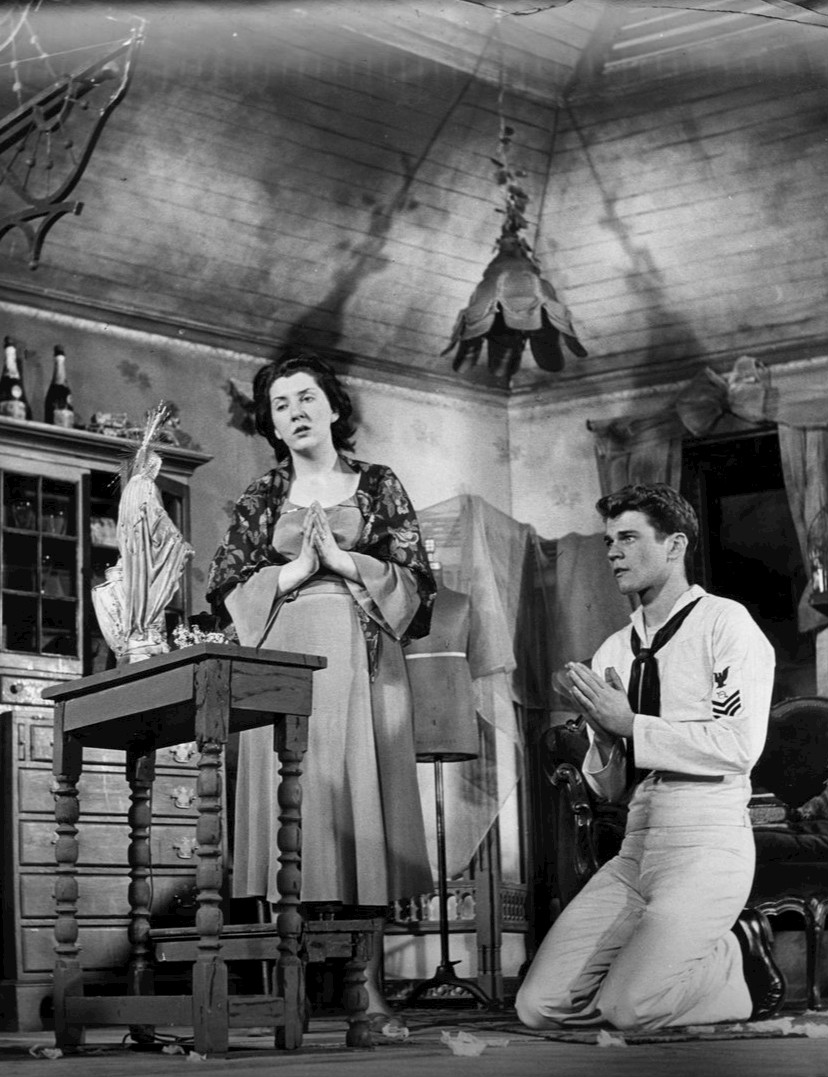
Maureen Stapleton and Don Murray, 1951

The original Broadway play starred Maureen Stapleton, Phyllis Love, and Eli Wallach. Other original cast members of the 1951 Broadway play included Martin Balsam and Vivian Nathan. The original production of The Rose Tattoo premiered February 3, 1951, at the Martin Beck Theatre (now known as the Al Hirschfeld Theatre) and concluded October 27, 1951, with a total of 306 performances. It was produced by Cheryl Crawford, written by Tennessee Williams; incidental music by David Diamond, staged by Daniel Mann, scenic design by Boris Aronson, costumes designed by Rose Bogadnoff, lighting designed by Charles Elson, general manager John Yorke, stage manager Ralph De Launey, conductor and harpist Nettie Druzinsky, musicians: Michael Danzi, Jack Linx and Frank Kutak, production associate Bea Lawrence, and press representative Wolfe Kauffman. Financial backers included Harold M. Esty, Jr. The play was recreated for a July 5, 1953, hour-long radio adaptation on the program Best Plays. Recordings of the radio drama exist in archives and private collections.

The play was revived in 1966, again starring Maureen Stapleton, with Maria Tucci replacing Phyllis Love in the role of Rose Delle Rose. Tucci was nominated for the Tony Award for Best Featured Actress in a Play for her performance. The revival ran from November 9 to December 31 at the Billy Rose Theatre (now known as the Nederlander Theatre) with 62 performances under the direction of Milton Katselas. Scenic design was by David R. "Tex" Ballou, costume design by Frank Thompson, lighting designed by Peggy Clark, stage manager Ray Laine, and press representatives Arthur Cantor and Artie Solomon.

The second revival, starring Anthony LaPaglia and Mercedes Ruehl, took place in 1995 from March 23 to April 30, running for 73 performances at the Circle in the Square Theatre with casting by Stuart Howard and Amy Schecter under the direction of Robert Falls. Scenic design was by Santo Loquasto, costume design by Catherine Zuber, lighting design by Kenneth Posner, sound design by John Kilgore, hair and make-up design by Claus Lulla, wig design by John Aitchison, general manager Don Roe, management consultant Gordon G. Forbes, stage manager Peggy Peterson, assistant stage manager Wm. Hare, and dialect coach K. C. Ligon.

New Directions Publishing reissued the play in 2010 with a new introduction by playwright John Patrick Shanley.

A third Broadway revival starring Marisa Tomei and directed by Trip Cullman premiered at the American Airlines Theatre in previews on September 19, 2019, and officially on October 15.

== Sources ==
For many years critics have looked for possible sources in Italian literature, suggesting such authors as Giovanni Verga or Luigi Pirandello. In 2016 an Italian critic for the first time found the undeniable inspiration for this play in Eduardo De Filippo's 1946 play Filumena Marturano. In the play, which was staged in Rome while the playwright was living in the city in the 1940s, the main character speaks one-to-one with the Madonna of the Roses in the same way that Serafina Delle Rose does in The Rose Tattoo.

== Controversy ==
On May 12, 1957, the Pike Theatre in Dublin, Ireland, staged The Rose Tattoo with Anna Manahan as the lead and the Irish scenic artist Reginald Gray as the set designer. After a short run, the theatre was invaded by the Irish police and director Alan Simpson was arrested for producing "a lewd entertainment" for miming dropping a condom onto the floor. Williams' script calls for a condom to fall out of a pocket during the show but the Pike staging mimed the act, knowing it would cause conflict. An intellectual revolt against the closing of The Rose Tattoo came from not only Ireland but from the continent, led by playwrights Samuel Beckett, Seán O'Casey and Brendan Behan. Simpson was later released. The presiding judge, Justice O'Flynn, ruled: "I can only infer that by arresting the accused, the object would be achieved of closing down the play." One of the results of this case was that any charges brought against theatre would have to be proven before the show could be forced to close.

== Cast ==
Characters	1951 original Broadway production	1966 Broadway revival	1995 Broadway revival	2019 Broadway revival
Serafina Delle Rose	Maureen Stapleton	Maureen Stapleton	Mercedes Ruehl	Marisa Tomei
Alvaro Mangiacavallo	Eli Wallach	Harry Guardino	Anthony LaPaglia	Emun Elliott
Rosa Delle Rose	Phyllis Love	Maria Tucci	Cara Buono	Ella Rubin
The Strega	Daisy Belmore	Georgia Simmons	Irma St. Paule	Constance Shulman
Estelle Hohengarten	Sonia Sorel	Marcie Hubert	Deborah Jolly	Tina Benko
Miss Yorke	Dorrit Kelton	Barbara Townsend	Elle Tobie	Cassie Beck
Salvatore	Sal Mineo	Sonny Rocco	Anthony Manganiello	Alexander Bello
Jack Hunter	Don Murray	Christopher Walken	Dylan Chalfy	Burke Swanson
Peppina	Augusta Merighi	Jo Flores Chase	Suzanne Grodner	Andréa Burns
Father De Leo	Robert Carricart	Dino Terranova	Dominic Chianese	N/A
Violetta	Vivian Nathan	Ruth Manning	Fiddle Viracola	Ellyn Marie Marsh
Vivi	Judy Ratner	Elena Christi	Jackie Angelescu	Isabella Iannelli
Mariella	Penny Santon	Anna Berger Malatzky	Elaine Bromka	Jennifer Sánchez
Flora	Jane Hoffman	Gina Collens	Catherine Campbell	Portia
Salesman	Eddie Hyans	L.M. Gibbons	Phillip LeStrange	Greg Hildreth
Doctor	Andrew Duggan	Kevin O'Morrison	Phillip LeStrange	N/A
Giuseppina	Rossana San Marco	Rossetta Veneziani	Carol Locatell	Susan Cella
Assunta	Ludmila Toretzka	Nina Varela	Antonia Rey	Carolyn Mignini
Bessie	Florence Sundstrom	Peggy Pope	Kay Walbye	Paige Gilbert
Bruno	Salvatore Taormina	Peter Flazone	N/A	Jacob Michael Laval

== Film adaptation ==
A film adaptation starring Anna Magnani was released in 1955. Magnani won an Academy Award for her performance.

== Awards and nominations ==
=== 1951 Original Broadway Production ===
Year	Award	Category	Nominee	Result
1951	Theatre World Award	Outstanding Individual	Maureen Stapleton	Won
1951	Theatre World Award	Outstanding Individual	Eli Wallach	Won
1951	Tony Award	Best Play		Won
1951	Tony Award	Best Featured Actor in a Play	Eli Wallach	Won
1951	Tony Award	Best Featured Actress in a Play	Maureen Stapleton	Won
1951	Tony Award	Best Scenic Design	Boris Aronson	Won

=== 1966 Broadway Revival ===
Year	Award	Category	Nominee	Result
1967	Tony Award	Best Featured Actress in a Play	Maria Tucci	Nominated
1967	Theatre World Award	Outstanding Individual	Christopher Walken	Won

=== 1995 Broadway Revival ===
Year	Award	Category	Nominee	Result
1995	Drama Desk Award	Outstanding Actress in a Play	Mercedes Ruehl	Nominated
1995	Drama Desk Award	Outstanding Featured Actor in a Play	Anthony LaPaglia	Nominated
1995	Tony Award	Best Revival of a Play		Nominated

=== 2019 Broadway Revival ===
Year	Award	Category	Nominee	Result
2020	Drama League Award	Outstanding Revival of a Play		Nominated
2020	Drama League Award	Distinguished Performance	Marisa Tomei	Nominated
2020	Tony Award	Best Original Score	Fitz Patton and Jason Michael Webb	Nominated
2020	Tony Award	Best Costume Design in a Play	Clint Ramos	Nominated

== See also ==
- History of Italians in Mississippi
