= SFB 874 =

The SFB 874 is a collaborative research consortium funded by the German Research Foundation. Speaker of the SFB 874 is Denise Manahan-Vaughan who is chair of the Department of Neurophysiology, within the Medical Faculty, of the Ruhr University Bochum. Focus of the consortium is research into the “Integration and Representation of Sensory Processes”. The consortium was founded in July 2010.

The goal of the consortium is to implement of a systems neuroscience strategy to clarify key aspects of sensory processing. The overarching question of this project is concerned with how sensory signals generate neuronal maps, and result in complex behavior and memory formation.

The consortium, which encompasses thirteen research projects spanning four species, addresses three common research questions :

- How does perceptual processing lead to neuronal and / or cortical plasticity?
- How does sensory integration lead to spatial and / or declarative representation?
- How does sensory learning enable the categorization of objects?

This is done

- at the level of first order perception and neuronal integration,
- at the level of second order integration and primary representation in the archicortex, and
- at the higher level of high-order representation and modification of the sensory percept in the neocortex.

The consortium interacts closely with the International Graduate School of Neuroscience and the Research Department of Neuroscience of the Ruhr University Bochum with the aim of educating young neuroscientists to the level of PhD in Neuroscience, and with the aim of disseminating research results to the public.

PhD students are regularly integrated into the research programme of the consortium, and candidates may apply directly to the programme for a PhD position.
