= The Matchmaker (1997 film) =

- Theatrical release poster
- Directed by: Mark Joffe
- Screenplay by: Karen Janszen; Louis Nowra; Graham Linehan
- Based on: Original screenplay by Greg Dinner
- Produced by: Tim Bevan; Eric Fellner; Luc Roeg
- Starring: Janeane Garofalo; David O'Hara; Milo O'Shea; Jay O. Sanders; Denis Leary
- Cinematography: Ellery Ryan
- Edited by: Paul Martin Smith
- Music by: John Altman
- Production companies: PolyGram Filmed Entertainment; Working Title Films
- Distributed by: Gramercy Pictures
- Release date: October 3, 1997
- Running time: 97 minutes
- Country: United States
- Language: English
- Budget: $7 million
- Box office: $6 million

The Matchmaker is a 1997 American romantic comedy film starring Janeane Garofalo.

== Plot ==
Marcy Tizard is assistant to Senator John McGlory from Boston, Massachusetts. In an attempt to court the Irish-American vote in a tough re-election battle, the bumbling senator's chief of staff, Nick, sends Marcy to Ireland to find McGlory's relatives or ancestors.

Marcy arrives at the fictional village of Ballinagra (Irish: Baile na Grá, literally the Town of Love) as it is preparing for the annual matchmaking festival. She attracts the attention of two rival professional matchmakers, Dermot and Millie, as well as roguish bartender Sean.

The locals tolerate her genealogical search while trying to match her with various bachelors. Sean tries to woo Marcy despite her resistance to his boorish manners. After they have begun their romance, they return home to Sean's house one afternoon to find his estranged wife Moira waiting for them. Marcy leaves Sean, upset that he did not disclose his marriage to her.

McGlory and Nick arrive in Ballinagra, although Marcy has been unable to locate any McGlory relatives. McGlory discovers Sean's wife's maiden name is Kennedy and brings her back to Boston as his fiancée just in time for the election, and wins by a small margin. While at the victory party, McGlory's father reveals privately to Marcy that the family is Hungarian, not Irish. The family name had been changed at Ellis Island when they immigrated, but as they settled in Boston with its large Irish population, he never told his son their true lineage.

Sean follows Marcy to Boston, and they reconcile.

== Cast ==
- Janeane Garofalo as Marcy Tizard
- David O'Hara as Sean Kelly
- Milo O'Shea as Dermot O'Brien
- Jay O. Sanders as Senator John McGlory
- Rosaleen Linehan as Millie O'Dowd
- Maria Doyle Kennedy as Sarah Kelly
- Saffron Burrows as Moira Kennedy Kelly
- Denis Leary as Nick
- Tommy Tiernan as Vince
- Robert Mandan as McGlory Senior

== Reception ==
=== Box office ===
The film opened in 705 theatres in the United States and Canada and grossed $1,378,930 in its first weekend and went on to gross of $3,392,080 in the United States and Canada and $6 million worldwide.

=== Critical response ===
Review aggregation website Rotten Tomatoes gave the film a score of 48% based on reviews from 33 critics, with an average rating of 5.7 out of 10 reviews.

Roger Ebert gives the film 3 out of 4 stars. Ebert praises Garofalo, calling her "one of the most engaging actresses around" and admiring the balance of "her cynical intelligence and the warmth of her smile". Ebert finds the Irish centre of the film charming and says the Boston bookends are distracting.

The Irish Independent notes: "Bad things happen whenever Hollywood and Ireland collide and this rather thin comedy is no exception" but say the film is helped by the central performance of Janeane Garofalo.

In a 2003 interview, when asked what films from her career she was happiest with, Garofalo included The Matchmaker among the few films she mentioned.

== Cultural references ==
Marcy's expectations clash with a host of colourful rural Irish characters in the tradition of such other works as The Irish R.M.

Filming took place on location in the town of Roundstone, County Galway. Besides the personalities of the villagers, the film establishes a sense of place through a generous use of village scenes, the local surrounding farms and a trip to the Aran Islands, with cavorting near Dún Aengus.

Worked into the story is a parody of Senator John Kerry's family background. His paternal grandfather was from Eastern Europe, picking a new name once arriving in America and blending into the Irish Catholic community in Boston.

== Music ==
Irish music is heard frequently throughout, both as background music and in scenes where it is performed live as when an Irishman (Vincent Walsh) competes for a kiss from Marcy with his sean-nós rendition of "Raglan Road".

The soundtrack features "Haunted" by Shane MacGowan and Sinéad O'Connor. "Irish Heartbeat" by Van Morrison and The Chieftains plays during the end credits. World Party's 1997 song "She's the One" is also included on the soundtrack.
