= Waking Ned =

1998 film by Kirk Jones

- U.K. theatrical poster
- Directed by: Kirk Jones
- Written by: Kirk Jones
- Produced by: Richard Holmes; Glynis Murray
- Starring: Ian Bannen; David Kelly; Fionnula Flanagan; Susan Lynch; James Nesbitt
- Cinematography: Henry Braham
- Edited by: Alan Strachan
- Music by: Shaun Davey
- Production companies: Tomboy Films; Gruber Bros; Mainstream S.A.; Bonaparte Films; Isle of Man Film; Overseas Filmgroup; Canal+
- Distributed by: Fox Searchlight Pictures (North America and United Kingdom); Pathé (France); Overseas Filmgroup (Overseas)
- Release dates: September 15, 1998 (TIFF); November 20, 1998 (United States); March 19, 1999 (United Kingdom and Ireland); June 9, 1999 (France)
- Running time: 87 minutes
- Countries: United Kingdom; Ireland; France; United States
- Language: English
- Budget: $3 million
- Box office: $55.3 million

Waking Ned (titled Waking Ned Devine in North America) is a 1998 comedy film written and directed by Kirk Jones and starring Ian Bannen, David Kelly, and Fionnula Flanagan. The film follows a group of townspeople who attempt to claim the money of a recently deceased lottery winner. Although set in Ireland, it was filmed in the nearby Isle of Man.

The film was distributed in North America and United Kingdom by Fox Searchlight Pictures. A stage musical adaption is expected to premiere in 2027.

== Plot ==
When word reaches Jackie O'Shea and Michael O'Sullivan, two elderly best friends, that someone in Tulaigh Mhór (Tullymore), their tiny Irish village of 52 people, has won the Irish National Lottery, they, along with Jackie's wife Annie, plot to discover the identity of the winner. They obtain a list of lottery customers from Mrs. Kennedy at the post office and invite the potential winners to a chicken dinner, where they attempt to get the winner to reveal him- or herself. After everyone has left and they are no closer to an answer, Annie realises that one person did not come to the dinner, so Jackie pays a late-night visit to the only absentee: Ned Devine. He finds Ned in his home in front of the TV, still holding the ticket in his hand, a smile on his face and dead from shock. That same night, Jackie has a dream that the deceased Ned wants to share the winnings with his friends, as he has no family to claim the ticket. Jackie wakes up after the dream, and before dawn, he and Michael return to Ned's house to gather Ned's personal information so they can claim the winnings for themselves.

Elsewhere in the village, Maggie O'Toole continues to spurn the romantic interests of her old flame, "Pig" Finn, a local pig farmer. Finn is convinced they belong together, as he thinks he is the father of her son Maurice, but she cannot abide him due to his ever-present odour of pigs. Finn has a romantic rival in Pat Mulligan.

Jackie and Michael call the National Lottery to make the claim, prompting a claim inspector to be sent. The inspector, Jim Kelly, arrives to find Jackie on the beach and asks him for directions to Ned's cottage. Jackie delays Jim by taking him on a circuitous route while Michael races to the cottage on a motorcycle, completely naked, and breaks in so he can answer the door as Ned. After discovering that the lottery winnings are far greater than they anticipated (totaling nearly IR£7 million), Jackie and Michael are forced to involve the entire village in fooling Mr. Kelly. All the villagers sign their name to a pact to participate in the ruse, except one—the local curmudgeon, Lizzie Quinn. She threatens to report the fraud in order to receive a ten-percent reward, and attempts to blackmail Jackie for £1 million of the winnings. Jackie does not refuse her outright, but later insists to Michael, "She'll sign for the same as us, or get nothing at all!"

The villagers go to great lengths to fool the inspector, even pretending Ned's funeral is a service for Michael when the inspector wanders into the church. The inspector leaves, satisfied that the claim is legitimate, and the villagers celebrate their winnings at the local pub. Meanwhile, Lizzie makes her way to the nearest working phone, a phone box outside the village on the edge of a cliff, and phones the lottery office. Before she can report the fraud, however, the departing claim inspector sneezes while driving past her and loses control of his car, forcing an oncoming van (driven by Tullymore's village priest, returning from a sabbatical) to crash into the phone box, sending it plummeting off the cliff and crashing to the ground below with Lizzie still inside.

At the celebration, Jackie spots Maggie, who is content to marry Finn now that he has the money to give up pig farming. Maggie confides in him that Ned is Maurice's real father, meaning that Maurice is technically entitled to the entire winnings. Jackie urges her to claim the fortune for Maurice, but she demurs, determined to keep the secret so that Maurice will have a father and the villagers will have their money.

At sunrise the next morning, Jackie, Michael, Maurice, Dennis, and Tom stand on a headland and raise their glasses to Ned, toasting him for his gift to the village.

== Cast ==
- Ian Bannen as Jackie O'Shea
- David Kelly as Michael O'Sullivan
- Fionnula Flanagan as Annie O'Shea
- Susan Lynch as Maggie O'Toole
- James Nesbitt as Pig Finn
- Adrian Robinson as Lotto Observer
- Maura O'Malley as Mrs. Kennedy
- Robert Hickey as Maurice O'Toole
- Paddy Ward as Brendy O'Toole
- James Ryland as Dennis Fitzgerald
- Fintan McKeown as Pat Mulligan
- Eileen Dromey as Lizzy Quinn
- Kitty Fitzgerald as Kitty
- Dermot Kerrigan as Father Patrick
- Jimmy Keogh as Ned Devine
- Jill Foster as Car Hire Lady
- Brendan Dempsey as Jim Kelly
- Matthew Devitt as Tom Tooney
- Paul Vaughan as Narrator
- Peter Carroll as Villager of Tullymore

== Production ==
Jones originally developed the idea for Waking Ned as a roughly 10-minute short film, but later expanded the work into a full-length script. In a 2013 interview, Jones reflected:

Investors responded to the humour and engaging story and came on board but the level of finance was of course very low. I was grateful to the cast and crew who agreed to work for reduced fees in order to get the film made. When the film was finished, we put it in the boot of a car and drove to Cannes where we screened it and sold it to Fox Searchlight in the US, where it was released later that year.

The film was shot on the Isle of Man, with the village of Cregneash standing in for the fictional Irish village of Tulaigh Mhór.

== Reception ==
=== Box office ===
Waking Ned opened in the United States on 20 November 1998 in 9 theatres, grossing $148,971 for the weekend. It expanded on Christmas Day to 259 theatres and expanded further in the new year to a maximum of 540 theatres. It grossed $24.8 million in the United States and Canada, and $30.4 million in other countries, for a grand total of $55.2 million worldwide. Its 1999 gross of $19 million in the United States and Canada was the highest for a limited release full-length feature film in the year.

=== Critical response ===
Waking Ned received a mostly positive response from critics. On the review aggregator website Rotten Tomatoes, 84% of 61 critics' reviews are positive, with an average rating of 7/10. The website's consensus reads: "A heartwarming comedy with a delightfully light touch, Waking Ned Devine finds feel-good humor in some unexpected – and unexpectedly effective – places." Metacritic, which uses a weighted average, assigned the film a score of 71 out of 100, based on 21 critics, indicating "generally favorable" reviews.

Roger Ebert of the Chicago Sun-Times lauded the film as "another one of those delightful village comedies that seem to spin out of the British isles annually". He added, "Waking Ned Devine can take its place alongside Local Hero, Comfort and Joy, The Snapper, The Van, The Full Monty, The Englishman Who Went Up a Hill But Came Down a Mountain, Brassed Off, Eat the Peach and many others." Derek Elley of Variety called it "a warmly observed comedy of manners" and wrote:

Though the pic throws up several twists as it progresses, at heart it is simply structured, relying on character studies rather than corkscrew plotting. As such, it's not laugh-out-loud material but time spent with a group of oddballs for whom normalcy is just one option in life. Given the amount of gab and paucity of real action, Jones paces the movie well, with little slack and a blackly comic finale that wraps the yarn in satisfying style.

=== Accolades ===
Kirk Jones was nominated for the BAFTA Award for Most Promising Newcomer. The film was nominated for the Producers Guild of America Award for Best Theatrical Motion Picture and the cast was up for the Screen Actors Guild Award for Outstanding Performance by a Cast in a Motion Picture, while David Kelly received a nomination for the Screen Actors Guild Award for Outstanding Performance by a Male Actor in a Supporting Role.

== Influence ==
Waking Ned inspired the 2006 Bollywood film Malamaal Weekly, directed by Priyadarshan, which was itself remade in Telugu as Bhagyalakshmi Bumper Draw, in Kannada as Dakota Picture, and later by Priyadarshan himself in Malayalam as Aamayum Muyalum.

It was remade in 2024 as a French Film with a very similar plot, À l'ancienne, in English as The Scammers, starring Didier Bourdon and Gérard Darmon.

== Stage adaptation ==
In September 2026, it was announced that a musical adaptation of the film would premiere at the Lyric Theatre, Belfast, in February 2027, written by David Hein and with music and lyrics by Markéta Irglová and the late Glen Hansard.
