= Ballylenon =

BBC radio situation comedy series

- Genre: Sitcom
- Running time: 30 minutes
- Country of origin: United Kingdom
- Language(s): English
- Home station: BBC Radio 4
- Syndicates: BBC Radio 4 Extra
- Starring: T P McKenna; Margaret D'Arcy; Stella McCusker; Aine McCartney; John Hewitt; Gerard Murphy; Roma Tomelty; Kevin Flood
- Announcer: Corrie Corfield
- Written by: Christopher Fitz-Simon
- Directed by: Eoin O'Callaghan; Peter Kavanagh
- Original release: 8 June 1994 – 2 March 2011
- No. of series: 8
- No. of episodes: 42
- Audio format: Stereo
- Website: Programme website

Ballylenon is a radio situation comedy set in a small village in County Donegal in Ireland in the 1950s. The six series totalling 30 half-hour episodes were originally broadcast on BBC Radio 4 from 1994 until 1999. The series was written by Christopher Fitz‑Simon, and it starred T P McKenna, Stella McCusker and Margaret D'Arcy. A seventh and eighth series were broadcast in 2009 and 2010. Music arranged and performed by Stephanie Hughes (Michael Harrison in Series 7 and 8).

The Daily Telegraph's radio columnist Gillian Reynolds cheered at the show's 1995 return, calling it "neat, witty, and perfect", and called the 1999 season "the perfect haven just now from all the mud, blood and studs everywhere else." In The Guardian, Elisabeth Mahoney found the writing in the show's 2009 season to be "a delicious mix of gentle and sharp, vividly bringing to life the rhythms of speech and social interaction in this Irish village setting".

In 2020, BBC Audio made the complete show, all eight series, available as an audiobook.

== Cast ==
=== Regular cast ===
- Phonsie Doherty – T P McKenna (Series 1–6), Gerard Murphy (Series 7–8)
- Muriel McConkey – Margaret D'Arcy
- Vera McConkey – Stella McCusker
- Vivienne Boal/Hawthorne – Aine McCartney
- Stumpy Bonner – Gerard McSorley
- Guard Bernie Gallagher – John Hewitt (Series 1–6), Frankie McCafferty (Series 7–8)
- Rev Samuel Hawthorne – Gerard Murphy (Series 1–6), Miche Doherty (Series 7), Dermot Crowley (Series 8)

=== Recurring cast ===
- Josie Doherty – Ciara McKeown (Series 3), Cathy White (Series 4 and 5), Ali White (Series 6)
- Aubrey Frawley – Dominic Letts (Series 1), Matthew Addis (Series 7), Chris McHallem (Series 8)
- Packy McGoldrick – Charlie Bonnar (Series 3 and 5), Tim Loane (Series 4)
- Peg Sweeney – Anna Manahan, Marcella Riordan (Series 5)

=== Guest cast ===
- Polly Acton – Joanna Munro
- Terry Black – Mark Lambert
- Mr Boylan – Derek Bailey
- Consuela Dooley – Cathy Belton
- Eamonn Doyle – Patrick Fitzsymons
- Jonathan Ffrench O'Dowd – Wesley Murphy
- Primrose Ffrench O'Dowd, Eithne Ni Phartalain – Marcella Riordan
- Canon Friel, O'Brollachain – Kevin Flood
- Mr Mawhinney – Harry Towb
- Monsignor McFadden – Niall Cusack
- Father O'Flatley – John Guiney
- Daniel O’Searcaigh – James Greene
- Bohunkus Smith – BJ Hogg
- RL Watson – Roma Tomelty

== See also ==
- Baldi
