= History of Italians in Mississippi =

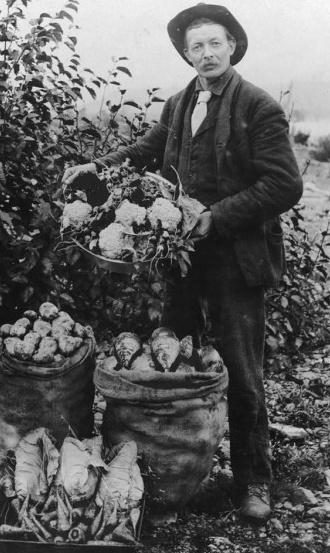
Italian farmer in the Mississippi Delta in 1909

The History of Italians in Mississippi is related to the Italian presence and emigration to the State of Mississippi in southern US. The immense obstacles that these Italian immigrants faced in assimilating into the broader society were far from easy, while also attempting to preserve their identity, culture, and traditions in a new land. Italian immigrants are responsible for developing and contributing to the region now known as Mississippi.

== History ==
In the 19th century, many Italians entered the United States in New Orleans and traveled onwards to Mississippi. Over 100 immigrants lived in Mississippi as the American Civil War started. In the late 19th century, Italian immigration increased in the United States, which made a tremendous impact on the area.

"The late 19th century saw the arrival of larger numbers of Italian immigrants who left Italy seeking economic opportunities. Some Italians from Sicily settled as families along the Mississippi Gulf Coast in Biloxi, Ocean Springs, and Gulfport, preserving close ties with those in their homeland. The fishing and canning industries. Others were merchants, operating grocery stores, liquor stores, and tobacco shops. Biloxi's prosperous tourist industry in the early 20th century created opportunities for ambitious young (Italian) men ... Italians also settled in the Mississippi Delta. The first immigrants came there in the 1880s, working to repair levees and staying as hired farm laborers on plantations. Some of these families became peddlers selling goods to farmers. In 1895, the first Italians came to the Sunnyside Plantation, across the Mississippi River in the Arkansas Delta. That plantation would become the stopping off place for many Italian settlers along both sides of the river. They were mostly from central Italy and experienced in farm work."

— Charles Reagan Wilson (University of Mississippi)

People originating in Sicily in real life became involved in the fruit industry in the area around New Orleans in the late 1800s, which in turn influenced Italian settlement on the Mississippi Gulf Coast.

== Roman Catholic faith ==
Most people in Italy are Roman Catholics. Italians are predominantly Roman Catholic as a whole, and so were those Italians that settled in Mississippi. The Catholic Church outfitted vital institutional support to them and future generations. Although the presence of a Catholic population in Mississippi is relatively minor, Italians are a prominent group within many Catholic churches across the state.

== Sicilian immigrants ==
Greenville, Mississippi had the most Sicilian immigrants out of other cities in the delta. Most immigrants first settled in New Orleans and worked in the sugar cane and cotton fields. Later on when they arrived in the Delta, they began to settle in towns, which enabled them to open up grocery stores, restaurants, and fruit stands. Because they lived in towns, rather than on farms, they had access to higher quality education, which they took advantage of.

Because of these opportunities, young Sicilian immigrants were able to grow up, become established and enter into the workforce much faster than Central Italian immigrants. Sicilians established strong ties with their homeland after coming to America.

== Italians in the Delta ==
Around the 1880s, the first Italian immigrants settled in the Mississippi Delta. Most immigrants were hired to be farm laborers on large plantations, whereas some became peddlers and sold goods to farmers. Religion, family roots and farming were the three vital traditions Italians managed to maintain after moving to the United States.

"...by 1910 some 115,000 Southern and Eastern European immigrants had settled in the eleven state region that had earlier comprised the Confederate States of America. The most numerous immigrant element to enter the region by that date were Italians, 44,358 in number, residing chiefly along the Gulf Coast and in the Mississippi River Valley....Many of these Italians remained to become independent farmers."

— William Marchione

Italians made a major impact specifically on the Mississippi Delta region, because of the farming culture they created by utilizing fertile soil in the land of opportunity – although they did get accustomed to the Southern tradition, but in doing so they also preserved their rich Italian culture.

== Perceptions of Italian immigrants ==
During the period of mass immigration to the United States, Italians suffered widespread discrimination in housing, social acceptance and employment. Local Mississippians had various beliefs and attitudes towards the 20th century Italian settlers. Many stereotypes floated around about them after they settled. During this time they faced discrimination, prejudiced attitudes and bigotry, all directed to their ethnic background.

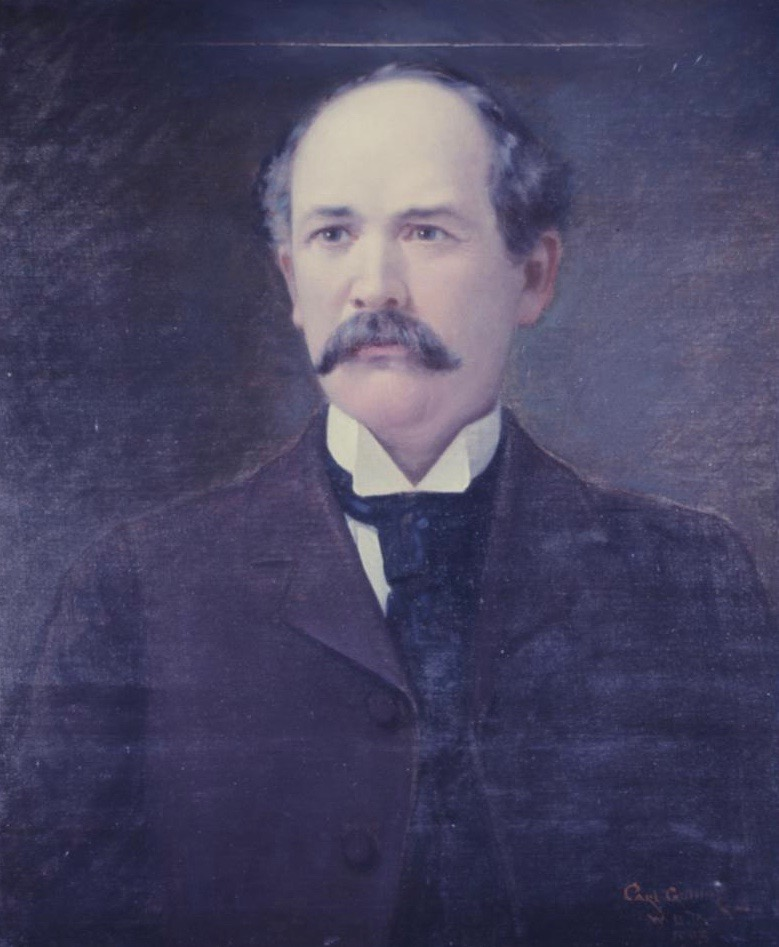
Governor Andrew H. Longino

First-generation became farmers, grocers, and merchants. The next generation became doctors, bankers, and lawyers. One of them was able to reach the top political level in Mississippi: Andrew H. Longino, who was governor from 1900 to 1904.

The Ku Klux Klan thrived off of targeting Catholics, including Italians. Italians were perceived as violent and dirty. Newspapers were even sensationalizing stories and headlines to further boost the negative reputation and stereotypes of Italian immigrants. Because of their darker skin tone and hair, Italians were viewed to be second-class citizens, unlike those of northern European ancestry. Italian immigrants that were tenant farmers at this time did work equivalent to African Americans, and therefore resulted in both ethnic groups residing at the bottom of the social scale.

Italian Americans were often victims of prejudice, economic exploitation, and sometimes even violence, particularly in the South. And Mississippi (with nearby Louisiana) was no exception to this.

=== Lynchings ===
Indeed, Mississippi and Louisiana were to become a worldwide symbol of anti-Italianism when, in 1891, eleven Italian immigrants in New Orleans were lynched due to their alleged role in the murder of the police chief David Hennessy.

This was one of the largest mass lynchings in U.S. history. The lynching took place after nine of the immigrants were tried for the murder and acquitted.

These nine Italians – some of whom were from the Mississippi Delta – who were thought to have assassinated police chief David Hennessy were arrested, tried, and acquitted. Subsequent to the trial, they were dragged from the jail in Parish Prison of New Orleans and lynched by a mob that had stormed the jailhouse, together with two other Italians who were being held in the jail at the time on unrelated charges.

Afterwards, hundreds of Italian immigrants, most of whom were not criminals, were arrested by the police even in Mississippi.

Furthermore, in 1899, in Tallulah, near the Mississippi border, five Italian Americans were lynched for the attempted murder of Dr. Ford Hodge. A vigilante mob hanged three shopkeepers, and two bystanders who were Italian Americans. Even in Erwin, Mississippi, some Italians were killed in 1901.

=== Actual integration ===
In the twentieth century, mainly after World War I, Italians started to be accepted and integrated very well into the Mississippi society. The food and restaurant industry was one of the areas where they had their biggest results and economic success.

The seafood (and small shipyard) industry of Biloxi was owned mainly by the family of Andrew H. Longino – governor of Mississippi from 1900 to 1904 – who was the first governor of a US Southern state with Italian roots.

According to Charles R. Wilson, one of the most prominent Italian families in Mississippi, the Bruninis of Vicksburg, produced a respected Catholic religious leader, the late Joseph Bernard Brunini, who was bishop of the Natchez-Jackson Diocese from 1966 to 1984. Bishop Brunini successfully promoted the integration of black people and other minorities in the 1980s.

== In culture ==
The setting of the play The Rose Tattoo is a place in proximity to Biloxi. The play has a film adaptation.

== See also ==
- Italian diaspora

== Bibliography ==
- Canonici, Paul. The Delta Italians: their pursuit of "the better life" and their struggle against mosquitos, floods, and prejudice. Publisher P.V. Canonici. New Orleans, 2003 ISBN 0974558907
- Magnaghi, Russell M. "Louisiana's Italian Immigrants Prior to 1870". Louisiana History magazine (Winter 1986), pp. 43–68.
- Rea, Robert (Spring 2014). "Tennessee Williams's The Rose Tattoo: Sicilian Migration and the Mississippi Gulf Coast". The Southern Literary Journal. 46 (2). University of North Carolina Press: 140–154. doi:10.1353/slj.2014.0009. JSTOR 24389063 – via Gale Academic Onefile. - See also at Project MUSE
- Sowell, Thomas. Ethnic America: a history. Publisher Basic Books. New York, 1983 ISBN 0465020755
- Walton, Shana. Ethnic Heritage in Mississippi: The Twentieth Century. Publisher Univ. Press of Mississippi. Jackson, 2012 ISBN 161703262X
