= A Portrait of the Artist as a Young Man (film) =

Film adaptation (1977) of James Joyce's novel (1916)

- Opening film credit, featuring a view from Glenmacnass Waterfall
- Directed by: Joseph Strick
- Screenplay by: Judith Rascoe
- Based on: A Portrait of the Artist as a Young Man by James Joyce
- Produced by: Betty Botley; Richard Hallinan
- Starring: Bosco Hogan; T. P. McKenna; John Gielgud
- Cinematography: Stuart Hetherington
- Edited by: Lesley Walker
- Music by: Stanley Myers
- Production company: Ulysses Film Production Ltd.
- Distributed by: United Artists Ireland (original); TriStar Pictures Ireland (DVD/VHS)
- Release date: September 1977 (UK)
- Running time: 92 minutes
- Country: Ireland
- Language: English

A Portrait of the Artist as a Young Man is a 1977 film adaptation of Irish novelist James Joyce's 1916 novel of the same name, directed by Joseph Strick. It portrays the growth of consciousness of Joyce's semi-autobiographical character, Stephen Dedalus, as a boy and later as a university student in late nineteenth-century Dublin.

== Cast ==
- Bosco Hogan – Stephen Dedalus
- T. P. McKenna – Simon Dedalus
- John Gielgud – The Preacher
- Rosaleen Linehan – Mary (May) Dedalus
- Maureen Potter – Mrs. Dante Riordan
- Niall Buggy – Davin
- Bryan Murray – Lynch
- Desmond Cave – Cranly
- Leslie Lalor – Milly
- Desmond Perry – John Casey
- Susan Fitzgerald – Emma Daniels
- Luke Johnston – Stephen Dedalus, age ten
- Danny Figgis – Wells
- Cecil Sheehan – Uncle Charles
- Edward Golden – Father Conmee
- Bill Foley – Confessor
- David Kelly – Dean of Studies
- Edward Byrne – Teacher
- Emmet Bergin – Father Dolan
- Aiden Grennell – Father Arnall
- Danny Cummins – Drinker
- Chris Curran – Auctioneer
- Brendan Cauldwell – Father Michael
- Eamon Kelly
- Anna Manahan
- Maureen Toal
- Jacinta Martin
- Chris O'Neill
- Brenda Doyle
- Deirdre Donnelly

Children

- Dominic Burdick
- Gray Burdick
- Linus Burdick
- Ashling Burdick
- Lucy Burdick
- Katy Burdick
- Tiernan Quinn
- Sean Pilkington
- Kenneth Joyce
- Joan Hayes
- John Hayes
- James Lennon
- Ronan Donelan
- Ian Branagan
- Terence Strick – Stephen Dedalus, age three (uncredited)
- Helen Strick
