= Waking Ned Devine (musical) =

2027 musical by David Hein, Glen Hansard and Markéta Irglová

- Poster for Lyric Theatre Production of Waking Ned Devine.
- Music: Markéta Irglová; Glen Hansard
- Lyrics: Markéta Irglová; Glen Hansard
- Book: David Hein
- Basis: the film Waking Ned Devine by Kirk Jones
- Premiere: 18 February 2027: Lyric Theatre, Belfast

Waking Ned Devine is an upcoming musical with music and lyrics by Glen Hansard and Markéta Irglová and a book by David Hein. Based on the 1998 black comedy film of the same name the musical is expected to receive its world premiere at the Lyric Theatre, Belfast in February 2027.

It was the final musical project worked on by Glen Hansard, before his death.

== Background ==
Waking Ned Devine was written by David Hein, with direction by John Doyle. The musical is based on the 1998 film Waking Ned Devine (Making Ned), by Kirk Jones. Set in the small fictional Irish Village of Tulaigh Mhór, the film revolves around a mystery lottery winner. When the villagers identify that the winner is now deceased, they work together to fool the lottery inspector and claim the money for the village. It was nominated for the BAFTA Award for Most Promising Newcomer for Kirk Jones, the Producers Guild of America Award for Best Theatrical Motion Picture and the cast was nominated for the Screen Actors Guild Award for Outstanding Performance by a Cast in a Motion Picture.

In April 2025, it was revealed that a musical version of the film was being developed and aiming for a Broadway premiere. A creative team of director John Doyle, writer David Hein and composer and lyricists Glen Hansard and Markéta Irglová were attached to the show. Hansard and Irglová had previously worked on the Tony Award wining musical Once.

Announcing the development director John Doyle said that:

No one could be better than Markéta and Glen to bring out the musicality in these Celtic characters and David is unmatched in his ability to find the heart and humanity in such a story.

— John Doyle

In September 2026, it was revealed that the musical would now premiere at the Lyric Theatre, Belfast in February 2027. The musical is the last project of Glen Hansard, who died in July 2026. Hansard was involved in the musicals early development, and following his death the creative team decided to proceed with the production.

== Production ==
The musical is scheduled to begin previews at the Lyric Theatre, Belfast on 13 February 2027, ahead of an official opening night on 18 February, for a limited run until 20 March 2027.
