= Pike Theatre =

Irish theatre

The Pike Theatre was a theatre located in Herbert Lane, Dublin, Ireland.The building was the Mews for No 6 Herbert Place (now No 43 Herbert Lane and is now occupied as offices)

== History ==
Established in 1953 by Alan Simpson and Carolyn Swift, the Pike offered Dublin audiences continental-style late-night revues and modern international playwrights such as Tennessee Williams and Eugène Ionesco. In its early days it staged two notable premieres – the first complete English-language production of Waiting for Godot (1955) (the London production had been censored by the Lord Chamberlain) and Brendan Behan's The Quare Fellow (1954). It was a favourite of critics such as Ulick O'Connor (critic for The Times) and Harold Hobson (critic for The Sunday Times).

In May 1957 the theatre was visited by the Gardaí. They said that it had been brought to their attention that the play being produced that evening contained "objectionable passages", which had to be removed if the performance was to proceed. If the play went ahead without cuts, Simpson and the co-owner of the theatre, Carolyn Swift, would be liable for prosecution. The play in question was the opening production of the inaugural Dublin Theatre Festival, The Rose Tattoo, by Tennessee Williams. It had won the 1951 Tony Award for Best Play, and the 1955 film version had won a number of Academy Awards.

The following day Alan Simpson was arrested and charged with "presenting for gain an indecent and profane performance". The theatre continued the play's run on stage, while an intellectual revolt against the closing of The Rose Tattoo came not only from Ireland but also from the continent, led by playwrights Samuel Beckett, Seán O'Casey, and Brendan Behan. Six weeks later, amid a welter of publicity, the hearing began. The defence team challenged a point of law in the High Court, lost, appealed to the Supreme Court, and won. Almost a year later, in June 1958, the hearing resumed. The judge found there was insufficient evidence to commit Alan Simpson to trial, and he was released. However the theatre fell on hard times and closed in 1961. Simpson went on to work for the Abbey Theatre, while Swift went into television and had a long association as scriptwriter with the children's program Wanderly Wagon.

The artist Reginald Gray designed many settings for The Pike Theatre, including the production of The Rose Tattoo.
