= Michael Manahan =

Michael Manahan (died 2000) was a prominent Irish civil servant, within the Department of Industry and Commerce. He played a pioneering role in all aspects of marine science and technology in Ireland spanning three decades. In recognition of this work the Irish Marine Institute created the prestigious Manahan Fellowship of €100,000, which supports original research in Marine Science Policy, Socio-Economics and Law of the Sea.

Michael Manahan served as a member of the Board of the Marine Institute from 1992 until his death in February 2000. As the former Head of the Science and Technology Division in the Department of the Taoiseach, he had a broad experience of science and technology at national and international level.

His daughter, Michele Manahan, is a writer for the Irish soap opera, Fair City. His sister is the Irish actress Anna Manahan.
