= Me Mammy =

- Genre: Sitcom
- Created by: Hugh Leonard
- Starring: Milo O'Shea; Anna Manahan; Yootha Joyce; Ray McAnally; David Kelly
- Country of origin: United Kingdom
- No. of series: 3
- No. of episodes: 21 (13 missing)

Production
- Running time: 30 minutes

Original release
- Network: BBC1
- Release: 14 June 1968 – 11 June 1971

Me Mammy is a British sitcom that aired on BBC1 from 1968 to 1971. Starring Milo O'Shea, it was written by Hugh Leonard.

== Background ==
Me Mammy first aired as a pilot within the seventh series of the BBC's Comedy Playhouse. The pilot and first series were made in black-and-white. Despite playing his mother, Anna Manahan was only two years older than her on-screen son played by Milo O'Shea. Many of the episodes are missing and presumed wiped. Only the first episode of the first series and the entire third series survive, However, although recorded in colour, the last series only survives in black and white.

== Cast ==
- Milo O'Shea as Benjamin "Bunjy" Kennefick
- Anna Manahan as Mrs Mary Kennefick
- Yootha Joyce as Miss Eunice Argyll
- Ray McAnally as Father Patrick
- David Kelly as Cousin Enda

== Plot ==
Bunjy Kennefick is an Irish mother's boy living in London. He is a top executive of a company and aspires to live a bachelor lifestyle. However, his old-fashioned Catholic mother often puts a stop to his plans, many of them involving his secretary and girlfriend, Miss Argyll. Other characters include Father Patrick, often mocked for his dubious morality, and Cousin Enda.

The episodes feature some surreal elements, such as "Catholic Chess", which pits pieces modelled on prominent Catholic figures against one modelled on prominent Protestant figures. On the Catholic side of the board are buttons which can drop opposing pieces through trapdoors, "sending them to Hell". Another example was the board game 'Popopoly' ("Hold your own Papal elections".). Bunjy's mother would pray to bizarrely named saints.

== Episodes ==
=== Pilot (1968) ===
- Pilot (14 June 1968) (part of Comedy Playhouse)

=== Series One (1969) ===
1. "The Day We Blessed the Bench" (15 September 1969)
2. "The Day Verilia Went to Pieces" (22 September 1969)
3. "The Night Me Mammy Snuffed It" (29 September 1969)
4. "The Day the Saints Went Marching Out" (13 October 1969)
5. "The First Time I Saw Paris" (20 October 1969)
6. "The Day Concepta Got England" (27 October 1969)

=== Series Two (1970) ===
1. "The Night Miss Argyll Got Canonised" (7 August 1970)
2. "Me Mammy's Tomb" (14 August 1970)
3. "The Night We Saw Old Nick" (21 August 1970)
4. "The Last of the Red-Hot Mammies" (28 August 1970)
5. "The Night Edna Entered a Convent" (4 September 1970)
6. "The Night I Left the Church" (11 September 1970)
7. "The Morning After Finnegan's Wake" (18 September 1970)

=== Series Three (1971) ===
1. "The Day We Went Dutch" (23 April 1971)
2. "The Night The Banshee Brought Me Home " (30 April 1971)
3. "The Day I Got Engaged" (7 May 1971)
4. "The Day I Went Commercial" (14 May 1971)
5. "The Sacred Chemise of Miss Argyll" (21 May 1971)
6. "The Mammy Murder Case" (28 May 1971)
7. "How To Be A Mammy in Law" (11 June 1971)

=== Surviving episodes ===
Series No'	Ep No'	Title	Broadcast	Notes
Series 1	Episode 1	The Day We Blessed the Bench	15 September 1969	
Series 3	Episode 1	The Day We Went Dutch	23 April 1971	
Series 3	Episode 2	The Night The Banshee Brought Me Home	30 April 1971	
Series 3	Episode 3	The Day I Got Engaged	7 May 1971	
Series 3	Episode 4	The Day I Went Commercial	14 May 1971	
Series 3	Episode 5	The Sacred Chemise of Miss Argyll	21 May 1971	
Series 3	Episode 6	The Mammy Murder Case	28 May 1971	
Series 3	Episode 7	How To Be A Mammy-In-Law	11 June 1971	

== See also ==
British sitcom
