= Anna Manahan =

Irish actress (1924–2009)

- Manahan as Mrs. Cadogan in The Irish R.M.
- Born: Anna Maria Manahan; 18 October 1924; County Waterford, Ireland
- Died: 8 March 2009 (aged 84); Waterford, Ireland
- Resting place: Saint Mary's Cemetery, Ballygunner, Ireland
- Occupation: Actress
- Years active: 1944–2006
- Spouse: Colm O'Kelly (m. 1955; died 1956)

Anna Maria Manahan (18 October 1924 – 8 March 2009) was an Irish stage, film and television actress.

Manahan received two Tony Award for Best Featured Actress in a Play nominations for her performances in the 1968 production of Lovers and the 1998 production of The Beauty Queen of Leenane, the latter for which she won at the 52nd Tony Awards.

Manahan was also nominated for two Drama Desk Awards, a Laurence Olivier Award, and an Outer Critics Circle Award in her career spanned more than 60 years. She interpreted the works of, among others, Seán O'Casey, John B. Keane, John Millington Synge, Oscar Wilde, James Joyce, Martin McDonagh, Christy Brown, and Brian Friel.

== Career ==
Manahan was born in County Waterford in what was then the Irish Free State (now the Republic of Ireland). Her career began when, as a young woman, she was recruited by the legendary Irish impresarios and theatrical directors Micheál MacLiammóir and Hilton Edwards. She later married stage director Colm O'Kelly, who died not long afterwards of polio, which he contracted after swimming in the Nile during a theatre tour of Egypt. They had no children and she never remarried. She was known professionally by her maiden name. In 1946 she appeared in a production by Irish playwright Teresa Deevy, The Wild Goose where she played the part of Eileen Connolly, this was performed by Equity Productions in the Theatre Royal, Waterford.

In 1957, she played Serafina in the first Irish production of Tennessee Williams' The Rose Tattoo and achieved unexpected notoriety when she and several other members of the cast were arrested for the possession of a condom on stage.

Manahan played a minor role in the Irish cult soap opera The Riordans (1960s), and as Mrs. Mary Kenefick in the TV comedy Me Mammy (1970s). She also played the lead in the Irish comedy series, Leave It To Mrs O'Brien (1980s) and Mrs. Cadogan in The Irish R.M. (1980s). Most recently she played Ursula in Fair City, for which her niece, Michele Manahan (daughter of Michael Manahan), is a writer.

She had an extensive theatre portfolio having played at theatres throughout Ireland including the Abbey Theatre, the UK, continental Europe, the US and Australia. She won the Tony Award for Best Featured Actress in a Play for her role as Mag in Martin McDonagh's The Beauty Queen of Leenane on Broadway. She previously received a Tony nomination in 1969 for Brian Friel's Lovers.

The late Irish playwright John B. Keane wrote the play Big Maggie specifically for her. In 2001 she starred in Keane's The Matchmaker with veteran Irish actor Des Keogh. In 2005 she starred in Sisters, a new play by Declan Hassett that was also written for her and for which she was nominated for a Drama Desk Award in the category of Outstanding Solo Performance. The production toured Ireland and was staged at the International Festival of World Theatre in Colorado and also played at the 59e59 Theater in New York City in 2006.

She appeared in films starring, among others, Laurence Olivier, Peter Cushing, Kenneth More, Christopher Walken, Maggie Smith, Albert Finney and Brenda Fricker, and with John Gielgud in A Portrait of the Artist as a Young Man (1977).

She received the Gold Medal of the Éire Society of Boston in 1984 and thus joined the company of past recipients such as John F. Kennedy, and film makers John Ford and John Huston. She received an honorary doctorate in letters from the University of Limerick in 2003. She was granted the freedom of the city of Waterford in 2002 in recognition of her life's achievement in the arts. She thus became the 28th Freeman of Waterford since Isaac Butt in 1877.

In 2004 she started to play the role of Ursula in Fair City. All About Anna (2005) a documentary on her life and work was made by Charlie Mc Carthy/Icebox Films for RTÉ television. In 2008, she became the first ever patron of the Active Retirement Ireland organization.

== Death and funeral ==
Manahan died of multiple organ failure on 8 March 2009 in Waterford, Ireland. She had suffered from a longterm illness.

Her funeral was held on 11 March, officiated by her "longtime friend" the psychoanalyst, poet, and priest Bernard Kennedy. "As the final curtain falls, the lights dim, the auditorium becomes silent, we remember her" he said. Describing her as a woman of faith (who "sought to bring the word of God alive"), he said she had brought everyone together to be present at "her last great exit from this great stage of life," saying her life's work had drawn people from all over the world. "Anna believed in the empty tomb of the Resurrection and she believed the empty tomb could be filled by hearing the word take the place of the emptiness," he said. "She knew the bedsits which preceded the Tony nomination."

Manahan was buried in Ballygunner Cemetery, Knockboy.

== Filmography ==
=== Film ===
- She Didn't Say No! (1958) – Maggie Murphy
- Of Human Bondage (1964, Metro-Goldwyn-Mayer) – Waitress (uncredited)
- Ulysses (1967, Continental Distributing) – Bella Cohen
- The Viking Queen (1967, Twentieth Century Fox) – Shopkeeper's Wife
- A Portrait of the Artist as a Young Man (1977)
- Clash of the Titans (1981, Metro-Goldwyn-Mayer/ United Artists) – A Stygian Witch #2
- All Dogs Go to Heaven (animated 1989, United Artists) – Stella Dallas (voice)
- Hear My Song (1991, Miramax) – Mrs. McGlinchy
- Fatal Inheritance (1993) – Mrs. Griffith
- A Business Affair (1994) – Bianca
- A Man of No Importance (1994, Sony Pictures Classics) – Mrs. Grace
- A Troll in Central Park (animated, 1994) – (voice)
- Woman Found Dead in Elevator (2000, Short) – Answering Service
- On the Edge (2001, Universal) – Cat Woman
- Black Day at Blackrock (2001) – Cat Woman

=== Television performances ===
- Art of Reception (1954, Documentary)
- The Riordans (TV Series, RTÉ, Ireland, 1960s)
- ITV Play of the week (1958, Episode: "Playboy of the Western World") – Widow Quin
- The Wednesday Play (1965) – Mrs. O'Brien
- Theatre 625 (1965) – Harriet Reilley
- Insurrection (1966) – Housewife
- Z-Cars (1967, U.K.) – Mrs. Boswell
- Sanctuary (1968) – Mrs. O'Reilly
- The Mike Douglas Show (1968, USA) – Herself
- Me Mammy (1968–1971, BBC, U.K.) – Mrs. Kennefick
- Fine Girl You Are (1973, TV Movie) – Olive
- Teems of Times (1978) – Granny Furlong
- Play for Today (1979) – Maggie Donoghue
- A Tale of Two Cities (1980, TV Movie) – The Vengeance
- Juno and the Paycock (1980, TV Movie) – Mrs. Madigan
- The Ballyskillen Opera House (1981) – Theresa Halligan
- Roger Doesn't Live Here Anymore (1981) – Woman in court
- ITV Playhouse (1974–1982) – Mary Higgins / Mother
- The Country Girls (1983, TV Movie) – Mrs. Burns
- The Irish R.M. (1983–1985, TV Series, Channel 4, U.K.)
- Leave It to Mrs O'Brien (1985, TV Movie, RTÉ, Ireland,1984) – Mrs. O'Brien
- Lost Belongings (1987) – Cilla
- Small World (1988, U.K.) – Nosy neighbour
- Blind Justice (1988) – Cora Davis
- The Bill (1989–1997, U.K.) – Mrs. Ward / Mrs. Kavanagh
- The Treaty (1991, TV Movie) – Woman 2
- Heaven Only Knows (1992, Short) – Greta
- The Young Indiana Jones Chronicles (1993, ABC, USA) – Old Woman at GPO
- Lovejoy (1993, BBC, U.K.) – Irish Lil
- Dear Boy:The Story of Michael MacLiammoir (1999)
- Straight to Video (2000) – Mammy Lily
- The Clinic (2004) – Brendan's Nan
- Fair City (2004–2009, RTÉ, Ireland) – Ursula Cruise (final appearance)
- All About Anna (2005, RTÉ, Ireland, A television documentary about Manahan)
- Ireland AM (2005) – Herself

== Theatre performances ==
- A Christmas Carol (1967, Gemini Productions, Gate Theatre, Dublin)
- A Miracle in Ballymore (Red Kettle TC)
- An Old Lady's Guide to Survival (Red Kettle TC)
- Big Love (2003, Peacock Theatre, Dublin)
- Big Maggie (written for her by John B. Keane)
- Bloomsday
- Cat on a Hot Tin Roof
- Drama at Inish (2005, Abbey theatre, Dublin)
- Entertaining Mr Sloane
- Happy Birthday Dear Alice (1999, Red Kettle TC, Garter Lane Theatre, Waterford)
- I Do Not Like Thee Dr. Fell (1988, Druid TC)
- Little City (1962, Gemini Productions)
- Live Like Pigs (1958, Royal Court Theatre, London, World premiere)
- Lovers (1969, Abbey Theatre Dublin, London and Broadway: Tony nomination)
- Moon for the Misbegotten
- Red Riding Hood
- Sive (1990, Pegasus Theatre Co.)(2002, Druid)
- Skull in Connemara (1997, World premiere, Druid TC, Royal Court Theatre, Duke of York's Theatre, London, and Sydney Festival)
- Sisters (2005, written for her by Declan Hassett, toured to Ireland, U.K., USA: Colorado & Broadway)
- Sweet and Sour (Gemini Productions)
- The Beauty Queen of Leenane (one and a half years on Broadway: Tony Award) (Druid TC)
- The Cherry Orchard (Gate Theatre, Dublin)
- The Crucible (1995, Red Kettle TC, Garter Lane Theatre, Waterford)
- The Dead (1967, Gemini Productions, Olympia Theatre, Dublin)
- The Doss House Waltz (1985, Gemini Productions, Eblana Theatre, Dublin)
- The Gingerbread Lady
- The Guernica Hotel (Red Kettle TC, World premiere)
- The House of Bernarda Alba (1950, Abbey Theatre Dublin)
- The Killing of Sister George
- The Loves of Cass Maguire (Druid TC)
- The Matchmaker (2001, Gemini Productions, Gaiety Theatre, Dublin; 2002, Irish Repertory Theatre, New York City)
- The Old Lady's Guide to Survival (1996. Re Kettle TC, Garter Lane Theatre, Waterford)
- The Plough and the Stars (RNT: Olivier nomination)
- The Private Death of a Queen (1986, Gemini Productions, Eblana Theatre, Dublin)
- The Rose Tattoo (1957)
- The Shaughraun (1990, Abbey Theatre, Dublin)
- The Taylor and Ansty (Gemini Productions)
- The Wild Goose (1946) Equity Productions
- Uncle Vanya (Gate Theatre, Dublin)
- Year of the Hiker (Gemini Productions)
- Zozz (1980, Gemini Productions, Olympia Theatre, Dublin)

== Radio performances ==
- Talking Heads (RTÉ)
- Happy Birthday Dear Alice (RTÉ)
- All That Fall (BBC)
- Ballylenon (BBC Radio 4)
- The Beckett Radio Plays (2006, RTÉ)
- The Shadow of a Gunman (BBC)
