= The Irish R.M. =

Irish television series, 1983–1985

- Genre: Comedy-drama
- Based on: Irish R.M. series by: Somerville and Ross
- Starring: Peter Bowles; Doran Godwin; Bryan Murray; Anna Manahan
- Country of origin: United Kingdom / Ireland
- Original language: English
- No. of series: 3
- No. of episodes: 18

Production
- Running time: 50 minutes
- Production companies: Ulster Television; Raidió Teilifís Éireann

Original release
- Network: Channel 4 (UK); RTÉ One (Ireland)
- Release: 6 January 1983 – 7 July 1985

The Irish R.M. is an Irish-British television comedy-drama series based on a trilogy of books by the Anglo-Irish novelists Somerville and Ross. It is set in the turn-of-the-twentieth-century west of Ireland.

== Books ==
The television series is based on stories drawn from:

- Some Experiences of an Irish R.M. (Longmans, Green & Co., London, 1899)
- Further Experiences of an Irish R.M. (Longmans Green & Co., London, 1908)
- In Mr Knox's Country (Longmans Green & Co., London, 1915)

All three books are in the public domain and can be accessed and used without royalty. The various stories concern the life of an Irish ex-British Army officer, Major Sinclair Yeates, recently appointed a Resident Magistrate (R.M.) in Ireland, when the entire island was still part of the United Kingdom. In the television series the Major is English and has previously spent little or no time in Ireland.

Also there is Slipper's ABC of Foxhunting (Longmans Green & Co., London, 1903), an album of 20 paintings, by Edith Somerville, illustrating various fox-hunting scenes, with verse commentary by Slipper.

== Filming ==
A television series based on the books was made in the 1980s, and was filmed in Ireland at locations in counties Kildare and Wicklow with additional locations in the west of Ireland in a co-production between Ulster Television and Raidió Teilifís Éireann. It was broadcast on Channel 4 and S4C in the United Kingdom, and RTÉ One in the Republic of Ireland. Like the books, the television series is a number of short stories around a few central characters.

Director Roy Ward Baker said it was "beautifully done."

Morristown Lattin – the house used as Aussolas Castle, the residence of Beryl Reid's incarnation of the erstwhile Mrs Knox (located at Newhall, Naas in County Kildare), was badly damaged by fire following completion of filming for the series. It has since been repaired.

Johnstown Kennedy – the house used as Major Yeates' residence, Shreelane House – was situated near Rathcoole, County Dublin. The extensive outbuildings were transformed into shops and pubs for some of the village scenes. The house was demolished soon after the third series was completed and a golf course now stands on the site. The design of the course preserved the large number of mature trees, and in addition the house's date stone and a number of other items are on display.

Furness House, near Naas, was used as Castle Knox, the home of Sir Valentine and Lady Knox and their daughter Sally.

For the second and third series, many of the Skebawn village scenes were filmed in Robertstown.

== Plot ==
Major Yeates (Peter Bowles) is portrayed as an Englishman, and much of the humour of the first series derives from his difficulty in adjusting to the more relaxed class boundaries and slower pace of life of rural Ireland. The timeline of the television series begins in 1897, when the Major departs for Ireland, and ends shortly after the death of Edward VII.

The R.M. has to deal with all sorts of everyday events with colourful characters, often being outfoxed by the machinations of his Anglo-Irish friend, Flurry Knox (Bryan Murray). Anna Manahan played the redoubtable housekeeper, Mrs Cadogan, while Virginia Cole played Bridget.

== Themes ==
Political references are, however, not completely absent; where they occur, they are invariably introduced in a subtle manner by guest characters. Notable among these are several visiting officials from Dublin Castle who regard the Major's dispensation of justice as unduly lenient, and a Catholic canon with strong Irish nationalist sympathies who exploits the naivety of the Major for his own purposes. In every case, the comfortable, if somewhat adversarial, co-existence of the Major and the local population is at risk. One element of the series' humour involves the efforts of Flurry and the Major to hasten the departure of these troublesome visitors.

One of the show's strengths lies in its ability to convey the lives of the Anglo-Irish gentry and it's local characters, which often became intertwined to produce the comic effects that are important to the Irish psyche.

== Episodes ==
=== Series 1 (1983) ===
No.	Title	Written by	Original release date
1	"Great-Uncle McCarthy"	Robert Chetwyn	6 January 1983
At the Regimental Ball in 1897, Major Sinclair Yeates tells his love he is resigning his commission to become Resident Magistrate in Ireland. Upon hearing that she is willing to accompany him, he sets off to claim his new post.
2	"Trinket's Colt"	Robert Chetwyn	13 January 1983
Just as Major Yeates is settling into his post as Resident Magistrate, the whimsical Old Mrs. Knox of Aussolas Castle is determined to overtake the bench and exercise her own perverse sense of judgement. Major Yeates manages to stand his ground, and is rewarded by an invitation to dinner at the ferocious woman's home. He manages to survive the very unusual turn of events that follow the meal. But his standing in his new community is threatened by the disappearance of one of Mrs. Knox's horses – a colt that he wanted to buy for his fiancée, Philippa.
3	"A Misdeal"	Robert Chetwyn	20 January 1983
Philippa gains an enthusiasm for riding, but the Major refuses to let her go hunting until she has a steady hunting horse. So they go to the Horse Fair with Sally Knox and her high-spirited new neighbor, Bernard Shut.
4	"The Boat's Share"	Robert Chetwyn	27 January 1983
Major Yeates' pompous and self-opinionated cousin comes to town. Though Basil is only there for a sampling of local customs, his visit causes trouble for the Resident Magistrate.
5	"Occasional Licences"	Robert Chetwyn	3 February 1983
Major Yeates discovers one of the Resident Magistrate's regular duties is to grant special licences to people for the purpose of supplying liquor to the annual St. Peter and St. Paul's Day Games. Flurry also manages to persuade the reluctant Major to host the festivities on his own estate and act as Chief Steward.
6	"O Love! O Fire"	Robert Chetwyn	10 February 1983
Major Yeates visited Flurry Knox, who is in a strange mood. On his way home Yeates meets Sally Knox. Her mother has discovered that Flurry took her carriage horse to ride in a race. She has quarreled with Flurry and Sally is to be sent to stay with her aunt in England. Yeates privately agrees with Lady Knox that Sally should not marry Flurry. His wife Philippa disagrees with this view of the subject. Major Yeates and Philippa have agreed to assist at the tenant's ball being given by Old Mrs. Knox.

=== Series 2 (1984) ===
No.	Title	Written by	Original release date
7	"A Horse! A Horse!"	Roy Ward Baker	12 July 1984
Flurry and Sally return from their honeymoon in Paris and Flurry is up to his old tricks again. He convinces Major Yeates to go on a hunting trip. Of course, Flurry's deceitfulness causes the Major to have an unfortunate accident, but Flurry gets just what he wants.
8	"The Dispensary Doctor"	Peter Sykes	19 July 1984
On the eve of the annual local regatta, family rivalries are aggravated when the Callaghans inform the police that the Foleys are planning a salmon poaching trip. The Foleys wriggle off the hook in Court, but trouble is brewing.
9	"Holy Island"	Peter Sykes	26 July 1984
The Major tries to forget the frustrating rum incident with a snipe hunt and an ill-trained dog. When the afternoon is cut short, he is left to deal with the mystery of the missing rum, an expired clergyman, and his wife, who is frightened by a noise sounding like snoring.
10	"Oweneen the Sprat"	Roy Ward Baker	2 August 1984
Christmas day is ruined by the arrival of a threatening note from Oweneen demanding compensation. The next day, the Major returns home to discover his wife and staff terrified by the appearance of a sprat nailed to the door. Flurry meanwhile has purchased the "Whiteboys", two Irish hunting dogs who turn the Boxing Day meet into a rampage.
11	"A Royal Command"	Peter Sykes	9 August 1984
To the Major and Sally's distress, Flurry has challenged a visiting Indian polo team to a match, and sold a wild young filly to the gullible John Cullinane. As expected, the Maharajah and his polo players are far superior to the ramshackle Skebawn team. But the game is overshadowed by the performance of John Cullinane's filly, who goes berserk, knocks over a goal post and disappears with a mob of spectators in tow. The situation worsens when the Maharajah invites himself into lunch.
12	"The Aussolas Martin Cat"	Roy Ward Baker	16 August 1984
Flurry learns that his aunt wants to rent out Aussolas Castle.

=== Series 3 (1985) ===
No.	Title	Written by	Original release date
13	"The Muse in Skebawn"	Roy Ward Baker	2 June 1985
Exposed to the wiles of the Irish, the Major is left alone as his wife goes off to England to tend to her ailing mother. Loneliness quickly becomes the least of the Major's problems as a shifty entrepreneur brings moving pictures into Skebawn. Stampeding townspeople, religious ire and outlawed entertainment ensues as the Major must return order to the roused community while fending off the unsolicited advances of Miss Bobby Bennett.
14	"Apollo Rigs"	Roy Ward Baker	9 June 1985
Coming to her brother's aid in Philippa's absence, Babs comes to Skebawn to look after the Major and run the household. Soon afterward, her helpful cousin Andrew arrives and begins to energetically mend everything in sight, including a crumbling chimney and a mysterious well. Cold water and strange spirits are soon unleashed as Andrew's enthusiasm goes a bit too far.
15	"A Friend of Her Youth"	Roy Ward Baker	16 June 1985
Babs is swept up in a tide of nostalgia as she fondly reminisces about her old friend Julian Chichester who is coming to stay at Skebawn. No sooner does Chichester arrive than he begins to dampen his image by scorning the Major's household, particularly the beloved canine, Maria.
16	"In the Curranhilty Country"	Roy Ward Baker	23 June 1985
It's time for the hunt as the Major drives to meet with the Curranhilty Harriers in a noisy new motor car, suffering the disdain of Flurry and Sally, who have arrived earlier by train. Despite the Major's modern marvel and his good intentions, the excursion is off to a rocky start with a series of misadventures including as unexpected trek, a malfunctioning motor and a hilarious prank involving the hounds.
17	"Lisheen Races"	Roy Ward Baker	30 June 1985
A bit of trickery ensues as preparation for the Lisheen Races takes hold of Skebawn. Furious at Flurry's disloyal support of Miss Bobby Bennett, Sally strikes a seemingly good deal with the cunning local horse dealer in order to enter the competition. Caught up in the race happenings himself, the Major manages to help save the day despite the discovery that his job performance has been called into question by a visiting Dublin official whom he later meets under less than perfect circumstances.
18	"The Devil You Know"	Roy Ward Baker	7 July 1985
The whole way of life at Skebawn is threatened when the Major receives an offer to take the position of R.M. in another community closer to Dublin. Upon hearing of the offer, Mrs. Cadogan and the rest of the household think the very idea of the Major leaving is a fine joke. But when the Major is faced with Slipper's antics in court he becomes so frustrated that he resigns on the spot. Soon a new and tyrannous R.M. is visited upon Skebawn inspiring Flurry to take action.

== Home media ==
All three series of The Irish R.M. were issued on DVD in the UK, distributed by Acorn Media UK. The DVD also includes an Ulster TV documentary about the filming of the first series. There are two slideshows, one of profiles of the lead actors and the other sample recipes from Mrs Cadogan's Cookbook (ISBN 0-09-158191-5).
