= The Quare Fellow =

1954 play by Brendan Behan

- Original language: English
- Written by: Brendan Behan
- Characters: Prison Chaplain; Warder Crimmin; Prisoner A (Hard Case); Prisoner B (The Man of Thirty); Prisoner C (The Boy from the Island); Prisoner D (The Embezzler); The Other Fellow; Enoch Jenkinson; Assistant Hangman; Shaybo; Second Warder; Neighbour; Mickser; Holy Healey; Chief Warder; Dunlavin; Cook; Halliwell, 2nd Asst. Hangman; Medical Orderly; Warder Regan; English Voice; First Warder; Scholar; Prisoner in Isolation; Principal Warder; Lifer; Prison Governor
- Genre: tragicomedy
- Setting: Mountjoy Prison, 1950s

Premiere
- Date: November 19, 1954
- Place: Pike Theatre, Dublin

The Quare Fellow is Brendan Behan's first play, first produced in 1954. The title is taken from a Hiberno-English pronunciation of queer (without the homosexual connotation).

== Plot ==
The play is set in Mountjoy Prison, Dublin. The anti-hero of the play, The Quare Fellow, is never seen or heard; he functions as the play's central conceit. He is a man condemned to die on the following day, for killing his brother. It revolts his fellow inmates far less than that of The Other Fellow, a very camp, almost Wildean, homosexual man.

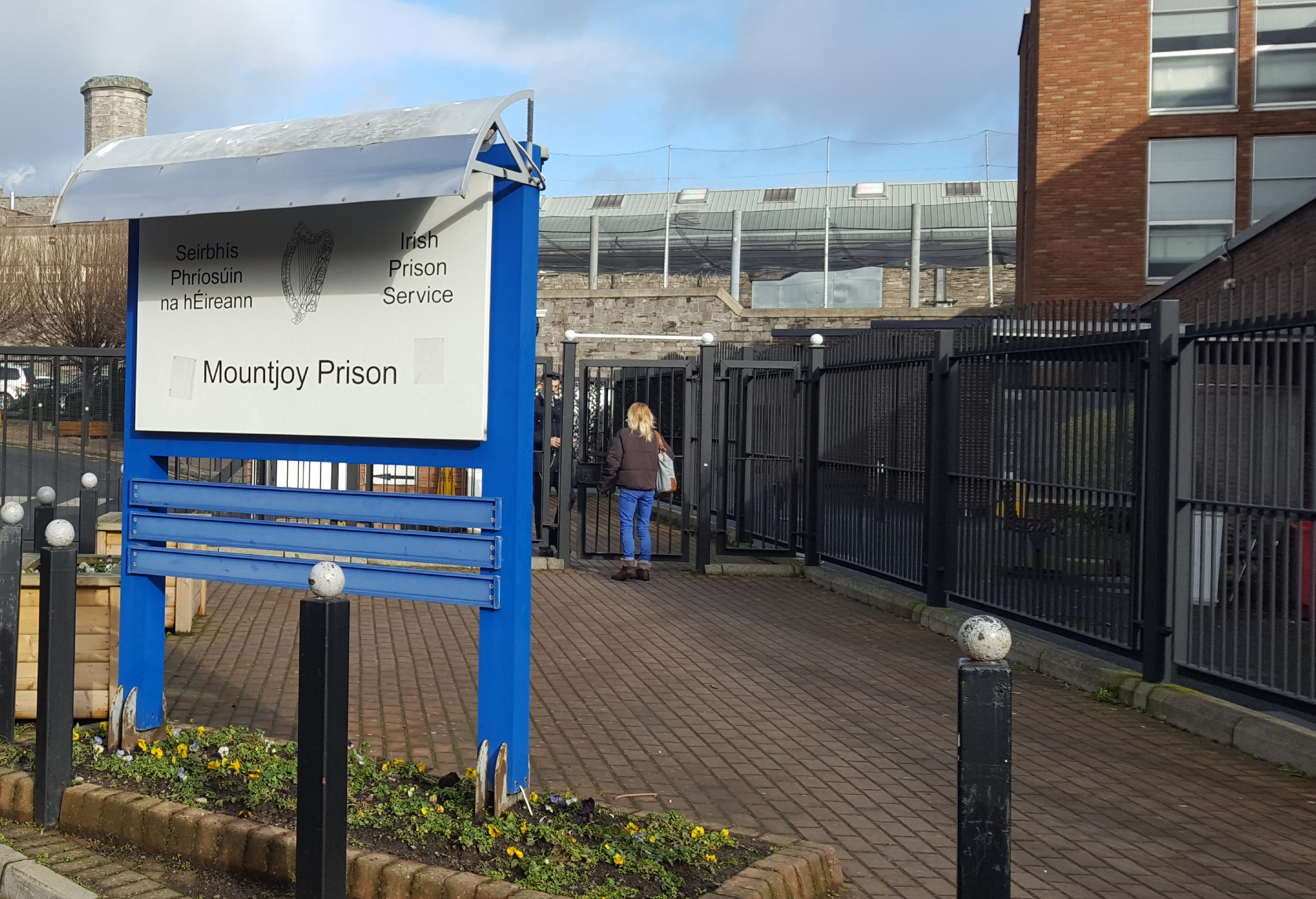
The Quare Fellow takes place in Mountjoy Prison during the early 1950s.

There are three generations of prisoners in Mountjoy including boisterous youngsters who can irritate both other inmates and the audience and the weary old lags Neighbour and "methylated martyr" Dunlavin (named for the village in County Wicklow).

The first act is played out in the cramped area outside five cells and is comedic. After the interval, the pace slows considerably and the play becomes much darker, as the time for the execution approaches. The focus moves to the exercise yard and to the workers who are digging the grave for the soon-to-be-executed Quare Fellow.

The taking of a man's life is examined from many different angles: his fellow prisoners of all hues, the great and the good and the prison officers.

The play is a grimly realistic portrait of prison life in Ireland in the 1950s, and a reminder of the days in which homosexuality was illegal and the death penalty relatively common (35 people were executed between 1923 and 1954, about one every 10½ months). The play is based on Behan's own prison experiences, and highlights the perceived barbarity of capital punishment, then in use in Ireland. The play also attacks the false piety in attitudes to sex, politics and religion.

== Name ==
The title is taken from a Hiberno-English pronunciation of queer, meaning "strange" or "unusual". In context, the word lacks the denotation of homosexuality that it holds today. The play does feature a gay character, but he is referred to as The Other Fellow.

In Ireland, the word 'quare' has also come to be used in a context that means "remarkable" (e.g. "That's a quare day" or "she's a quare singer"), which is most likely the sense in which Behan intends it to be read. It is also used to add accentuation to an adjective, usually as an alternative to 'very' (e.g. "he's a quare good pianist" or "that was quare heavy rain this morning"). The word remains in common use in Ireland.

== Performance ==
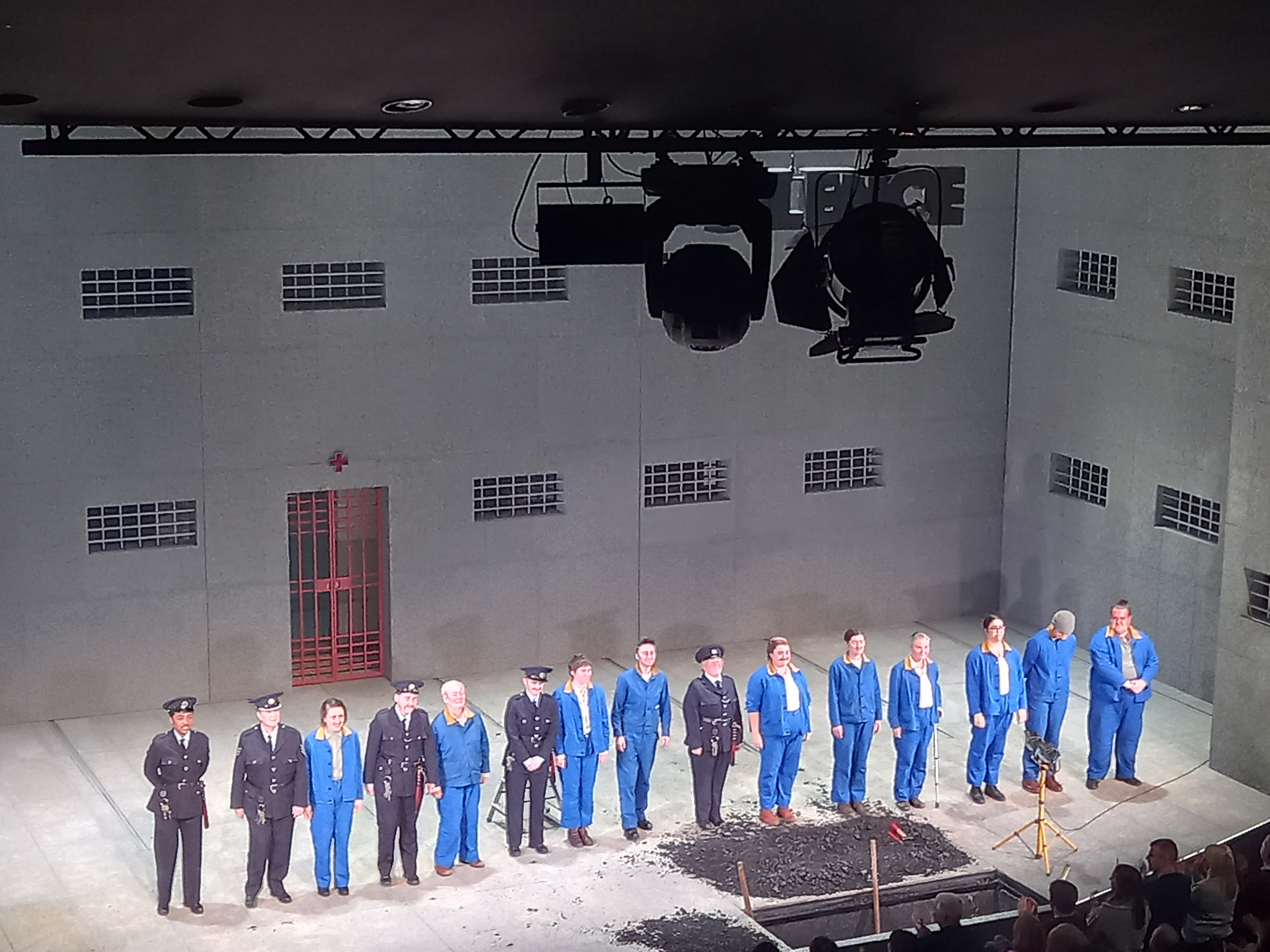
Cast of an all-female version of The Quare Fellow, Abbey Theatre, 2024

The play was offered to Dublin's Abbey Theatre, but was turned down. It premièred at the Pike Theatre Club, Herbert Lane, Dublin, on 19 November 1954 to critical success. The Quare Fellow had its London première in May 1956 at Joan Littlewood's Theatre Workshop at the Theatre Royal Stratford East. On 24 July 1956 it transferred to the Comedy Theatre, London. In September 1956 the Abbey Theatre finally performed The Quare Fellow. It had such success that the Abbey's artistic director, Ria Mooney, pushed the next play back to allow The Quare Fellow to run for six weeks. In October 1956 it transferred to Streatham Hill Theatre. Its first New York performance was on 27 November 1958 at the Circle in the Square Theatre.

== "The Auld Triangle" ==
"The Auld Triangle", a song from the opening of the play, has become an Irish music standard and is known by many who are unaware of its link to The Quare Fellow.
