= New Hampshire Film Festival =

Annual film festival in Portsmouth, New Hampshire

- Location: Portsmouth, New Hampshire
- Founded: 2001
- Most recent: October 15–18, 2026
- Website: nhfilmfestival.com

The New Hampshire Film Festival is an annual film festival held every October in Portsmouth, New Hampshire. Its program consists of new domestic and international independent feature films and short films in competition, including narratives and documentaries. The festival also hosts panel discussions, workshops and social events.

Founded in 2001 in Derry, New Hampshire, as the New Hampshire Film Expo, the festival moved to Portsmouth in 2004 and changed its name to the New Hampshire Film Festival in 2007. The festival screens over 100 films in four days across multiple venues and draws 10,000 attendees.

In 2021, the festival was named an Academy Awards qualifying festival for the Short Film Awards by the Academy of Motion Picture Arts and Sciences.

== History ==
=== 2000s ===
The New Hampshire Film Festival was founded in 2001 by Dan Hannon, Judy Krassowski, Brett Parker and Chris Proulx, initially as the New Hampshire Film Expo. The inaugural festival took place September 14–16, 2001, in Derry, New Hampshire, with screenings at the Adams Memorial Opera House. Instead of canceling in the wake of the September 11 attacks, the organizers thought that people would need film more than ever. Filmmakers attending from New York City participated in candlelight vigils. The program included film screenings, a trade show, and workshops, including establishment of the annual Young Filmmaker's Workshop.

In 2002, the festival shifted to October. The line-up of 68 screenings included features, documentaries, shorts, animation, international films, and films from New Hampshire and the rest of New England. It was also the inaugural year of the festival's screenwriting competition.

In 2003, actor Brian Austin Green attended the festival for a screening of Fish Without a Bicycle, his feature film directorial debut.

The festival relocated to Portsmouth, New Hampshire, for its 2004 edition, to expand into multiple spaces within walking distance, including The Music Hall and other downtown venues, with access to more hotels and restaurants. Nicole Gregg, events manager for the Portsmouth Chamber of Commerce, joined the festival as director of development. The shorts line-up included the world premiere of Thunder Road, narrated by television host and New Hampshire native Seth Meyers.

The 2005 program included Heart of the Beholder, which won for Best Feature and represented an early film role for Chloë Grace Moretz.

In 2006, Nicole Gregg was named the festival's first executive director, a position she would hold until 2024. Narrative feature films that year included Johnny Was, Drunkboat, and Live Free or Die. Headlining the documentaries was Christa McAuliffe: Reach for the Stars, narrated by actress Susan Sarandon.

The festival changed its name from the New Hampshire Film Expo to the New Hampshire Film Festival in 2007. Award-winning films that year included On Broadway and The Sensation of Sight. The festival also established a special guest judge for its screenplay competition beginning in 2007 with Diane Lake. Screenplay judges since then have included Anna Boden and Ryan Fleck, Joyce Maynard, David Dastmalchian, and Nathan Silver.

In 2008, the festival established the annual Van McLeod Award, which honors someone who makes a significant contribution to the film or television industry. The award is named in honor of the late commissioner of the New Hampshire Department of Cultural Resources. Van McLeod died in 2016, receiving memorial praise from New Hampshire Governor Maggie Hassan, U.S. Senator Kelly Ayotte and U.S. Senator Jeanne Shaheen. Recipients of the Van McLeod Award are Chase Bailey (2008), Ernest Thompson (2009), Ken Burns (2010), Chris Stinson (2011), Mike O'Malley (2012), Lisa Muskat (2013), Paul Lazarus (2014), Gordon Clapp (2015), Joan Goshgarian/Chelsea McLeod (2016), Aaron J. Wiederspahn (2017), Barry Steelman (2018), Matt Renner (2019), Julian Higgins (2022), and Marcy Carsey (2023).

Also in 2008, the festival hosted artists-in-residence filmmakers Julia Reichert and Steve Bognar for a discussion and screening of their documentary film A Lion in the House. Other films in the program included TransSiberian, August and The Tiger's Tail. Awarded films included Cutlass, I.O.U.S.A., The Life Before Her Eyes, and The Unknown Woman.

In 2009, the headlining films included Serious Moonlight, Paper Heart and Mystery Team, a comedy shot in New Hampshire from Manchester, New Hampshire filmmaker Dan Eckman. Other films included Food, Inc., as well as festival award-winners That Evening Sun and Splinterheads. Writer-director Robert Eggers, who also hails from New Hampshire, had his short film The Tell-Tale Heart in the program.

=== 2010s ===
In 2010, the festival’s 10th anniversary edition, New Hampshire Governor John Lynch proclaimed the weekend of the festival as "New Hampshire Film Festival Weekend." Actor-producer Adrian Grenier attended a screening of his new documentary Teenage Paparazzo, followed by an audience discussion and press interviews. Other films in the line-up included The Extra Man, Leaves of Grass, and short films by Sean Durkin and James Franco.

Also in 2010, the festival hosted its inaugural comedy panel. Entitled "A Conversation on Comedy in Film," it was moderated by Rae Dawn Chong and featured Dan Carey, Juston McKinney, Kris Meyer, Brandt Sersen and Jordan Vogt-Roberts. Since then, comedy panel alumni include Tommy Chong, Adam Jones, T.J. Miller, Jimmy Tingle and Jeff Tomsic (2011), Precious Chong, Dale Launer and Mike O'Malley (2012), Tom Bergeron and Greg Kretschmar (2013), Jimmy Dunn and John Michael Higgins (2015), Josh Meyers (2016), Cole Escola and Peter Mackenzie (2017), Tim Herlihy and John Viener (2018), Hayes MacArthur (2019), Robert Kelly, Aaron Lee, Laura Silverman and Gary Valentine (2022), Marcy Carsey, Eliza Coupe and Jon Rineman (2023).

2011 narrative films included Puncture and Happy, Happy. Documentaries included Being Elmo: A Puppeteer's Journey. Short films included I’m Having a Difficult Time Killing My Parents, directed by Jeff Tomsic and starring T.J. Miller, which won the festival’s Best Short Comedy Award.

The 2012 festival program included Certainty, Quartet, Side by Side, Fairhaven, and Hello I Must Be Going. Writer-director Austin Chick returned to the festival with his new film, Girls Against Boys.

In 2013, MovieMaker Magazine named the festival one of the "Top 50 Festivals Worth the Entry Fee." The festival would receive this designation again in 2015, 2016, 2017, 2018, 2019, 2020, 2021, and 2023.

The film roster in 2013 included Prince Avalanche, Blackfish, Touchy Feely, The English Teacher, and Drinking Buddies. Other spotlights included Labor Day and Grand Jury Award winner All That I Am, with star Christopher Abbott and director Carlos Puga in attendance. The short film line-up included the world premiere of Here and Now from New Hampshire native Julian Higgins, selected by director-producer-actor Ron Howard as the winner of Canon Inc.’s Project Imagination Short Film Contest.

In 2014, Flea of the band Red Hot Chili Peppers attended the festival in support of Low Down, a film he executive produced and appears in. Blues legend and Blues Hall of Fame inductee Otis Clay attended the screening of music documentary Take Me to the River, in which he is a subject. Other films included Men, Women & Children starring actor-comedian Adam Sandler, who hails from New Hampshire, Animals, Boyhood, Manhattan Romance, Match, and Two Step. Short film The Phone Call went on to win the Academy Award for Best Live Action Short Film.

The last day of the 2014 festival featured a tribute to James Foley, a journalist from New Hampshire who was kidnapped and executed in Syria. A screening of the documentary E-Team, which was partially shot by Foley, was followed by an award presentation for Best Documentary to co-director Ross Kauffman. Kauffman in turn presented the film’s Cinematography Award from the Sundance Film Festival to Foley’s parents. Foley’s father announced the creation of the James W. Foley Legacy Foundation.

In 2015, writer-director Robert Eggers returned to the festival with his first feature The Witch. He took the stage to discuss the film’s production, reception and upcoming distribution. The film won the festival’s Best Feature Award. Other films in the program included Manglehorn and Anomalisa.

In 2016, actress-producer Alysia Reiner attended the screening of her film Equity. She also received the Pioneer in Filmmaking Award and participated on a Women in Film panel discussion. Actor John Michael Higgins returned to the festival for an on-stage presentation discussing favorite clips from his films.

Director Michelle MacLaren returned to the festival in 2017, having attended previously in 2014, along with studio executive Steve Mosko for a moderated behind-the-scenes discussion of television shows Game of Thrones, Better Call Saul, The Deuce, Westworld, The Walking Dead, The X-Files, Breaking Bad and Kevin Can Wait. Robert Eggers also participated in the festival again, this time as a member of the narrative grand jury. The film line-up included The Florida Project, Lucky, Marjorie Prime, and The Square. The festival also introduced its own mobile app in 2017.

In 2018, actor-comedian David Spade attended the festival for a question-and-answer session and screening of his film Father of the Year with director Tyler Spindel, who hails from New Hampshire. The film is set in the state. Also in 2018, the festival screened virtual reality films for the first time. Shown were four short films packaged together as This Is Climate Change: Melting Ice, Famine, Fire, and Feast. Other films in the overall program included Eighth Grade, Leave No Trace, Love, Gilda, and Science Fair. New Hampshire native Victoria Arlen was on hand for a screening of her film Locked In. The short documentary chronicles her story from paralyzed teenager to correspondent for ESPN, Dancing with the Stars contestant and award-winning Paralympian.

2019 was spotlighted by The Lighthouse from writer-director Robert Eggers and Uncut Gems starring Adam Sandler, both of whom grew up in New Hampshire. The festival also featured The Cave from executive producer and New Hampshire native Matt Renner. Short film The Neighbors’ Window went on to win the Academy Award for Best Live Action Short Film.

=== 2020s ===
The festival’s 20th anniversary edition, originally slated for 2020, was postponed to 2021 and then postponed again to 2022 due to the ongoing COVID-19 pandemic.

In 2021, the Academy of Motion Picture Arts and Sciences named the festival an Academy Awards qualifying festival for the Short Film Awards. Short films that receive the festival’s Live Action Shorts Jury Award and Animation Shorts Jury Award may now qualify to enter the Short Films competition for the concurrent Oscars season.

In 2022, the festival’s 20th anniversary edition, writer-director Julian Higgins returned with his first feature God's Country. Other film titles included The Lost King, Aftersun, and R.M.N..

In 2023, producer Ted Hope attended the festival on the narrative grand jury, rounded out by actress-comedian Eliza Coupe and Julian Higgins, and participated on an industry talk. He also supported the screening of his new documentary Invisible Nation, which he produced with his wife and its director Vanessa Hope. Other films in the line-up included Eileen and A Little Prayer.

In 2024, the festival joined the nonprofit organization The Music Hall, which brings performing arts and film programming to New Hampshire year-round. The Music Hall, a festival screening venue since the move to Portsmouth in 2004, now runs the event. Nicole Gregg stepped back as the festival’s executive director with The Music Hall’s executive director, Tina Sawtelle, stepping in. Gregg continues in an advisory capacity, with a new title of founding director for her tenure as the festival’s first executive director. Other longtime festival team members also remain involved, including festival co-founder Dan Hannon and programming curator Ian McCarthy.
