= Will Arnett =

Canadian actor (born 1970)

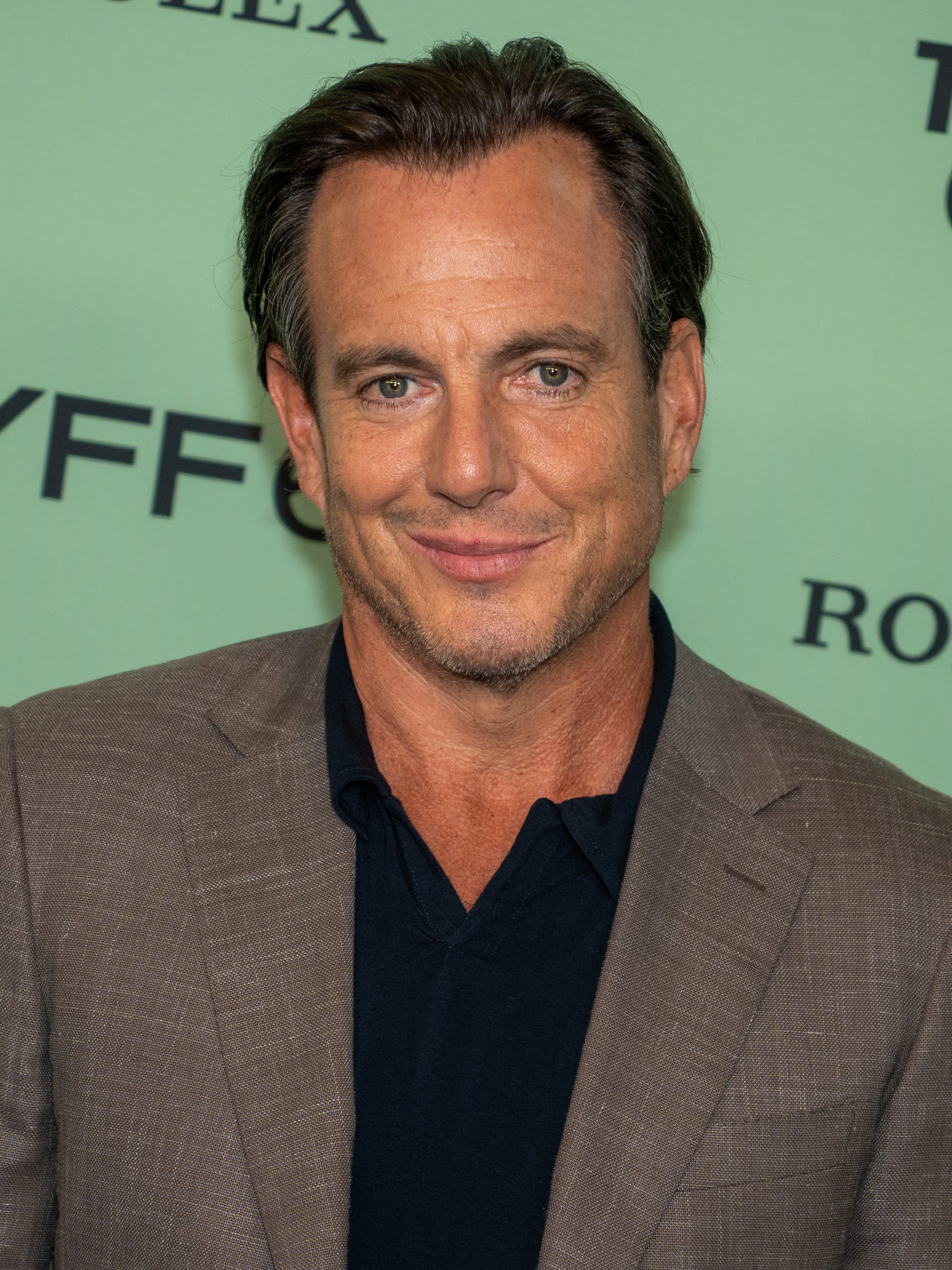
- Arnett at the 2025 New York Film Festival
- Born: William Emerson Arnett; May 4, 1970 (age 56); Toronto, Ontario, Canada
- Citizenship: Canada; United States
- Occupations: Actor; comedian; producer
- Years active: 1994–present
- Spouses: Penelope Ann Miller (m. 1994; div. 1995); Amy Poehler (m. 2003; div. 2016)
- Partner: Alessandra Brawn (2019–2024)
- Children: 3

William Emerson Arnett (/ɑːrˈnɛt/; born May 4, 1970) is a Canadian and American actor and comedian. He is widely known for his roles as Gob Bluth in the Fox/Netflix sitcom Arrested Development (2003–2019) and the titular character in the Netflix animated series BoJack Horseman (2014–2020). He has received nominations for seven Primetime Emmy Awards, three Actor Awards, and a Golden Globe Award.

On television, Arnett is also known for his Emmy-nominated recurring role as Devon Banks in the NBC sitcom 30 Rock (2007–2013). He has also acted in films such as Hot Rod (2007), Blades of Glory (2007), Semi-Pro (2008), Teenage Mutant Ninja Turtles (2014), Teenage Mutant Ninja Turtles: Out of the Shadows (2016), Is This Thing On? (2025), and Behemoth! (2026). Known for his deep baritone voice, his voice roles include Ratatouille (2007), Horton Hears a Who! (2008), Monsters vs. Aliens (2009), Despicable Me (2010), The Lego Movie franchise (2014–2019), Teen Titans Go! To the Movies (2018), Chip 'n Dale: Rescue Rangers (2022), and Twisted Metal (2023–).

From 2020 to 2025, he hosted the Fox reality series Lego Masters. Arnett co-hosts the comedy podcast SmartLess (2020–) alongside Sean Hayes and Jason Bateman.

== Early life ==
Arnett was born in Toronto, Ontario, to Edith Alexandra "Alix" (née Palk) and Emerson James "Jim" Arnett, who was a corporate lawyer and brewer, among other occupations. His parents were originally from Winnipeg, Manitoba, and he has roots on both sides of his family in Manitoba going back many generations. Arnett has older twin sisters and a younger brother. His father, a graduate of Harvard University, served as the president and CEO of Molson Breweries from 1997 to 2000.

His mother is the cousin of noted Canadian stage actress Nancy Palk.

Arnett briefly attended Lakefield College School in Lakefield, Ontario, but was asked not to return after a semester for being a troublemaker. The Subway Academy II allowed him to take theatre classes at the Tarragon Theatre. He eventually graduated from Leaside High School and attended Concordia University, Montreal, for a semester but dropped out. As a teenager, he was encouraged by his mother to pursue an acting career. He auditioned for commercials in Toronto and enjoyed acting. In 1990, he moved to New York City to study acting at the Lee Strasberg Theatre and Film Institute. He appeared in plays in New York, and his first screen role was in Felicity Huffman's independent film Erie, which was filmed on the Erie Canal. As mentioned on the SmartLess podcast, Arnett is an avid hockey fan and workout enthusiast, known to often boast about his "Pro Dumper" and ability to bench press as much as 165 pounds.

In 1994, Arnett was one of the hosts of the weekend-long Pay-Per-View event for Woodstock '94, his first television appearance.

== Career ==
=== 1996–2002: Rise to prominence ===
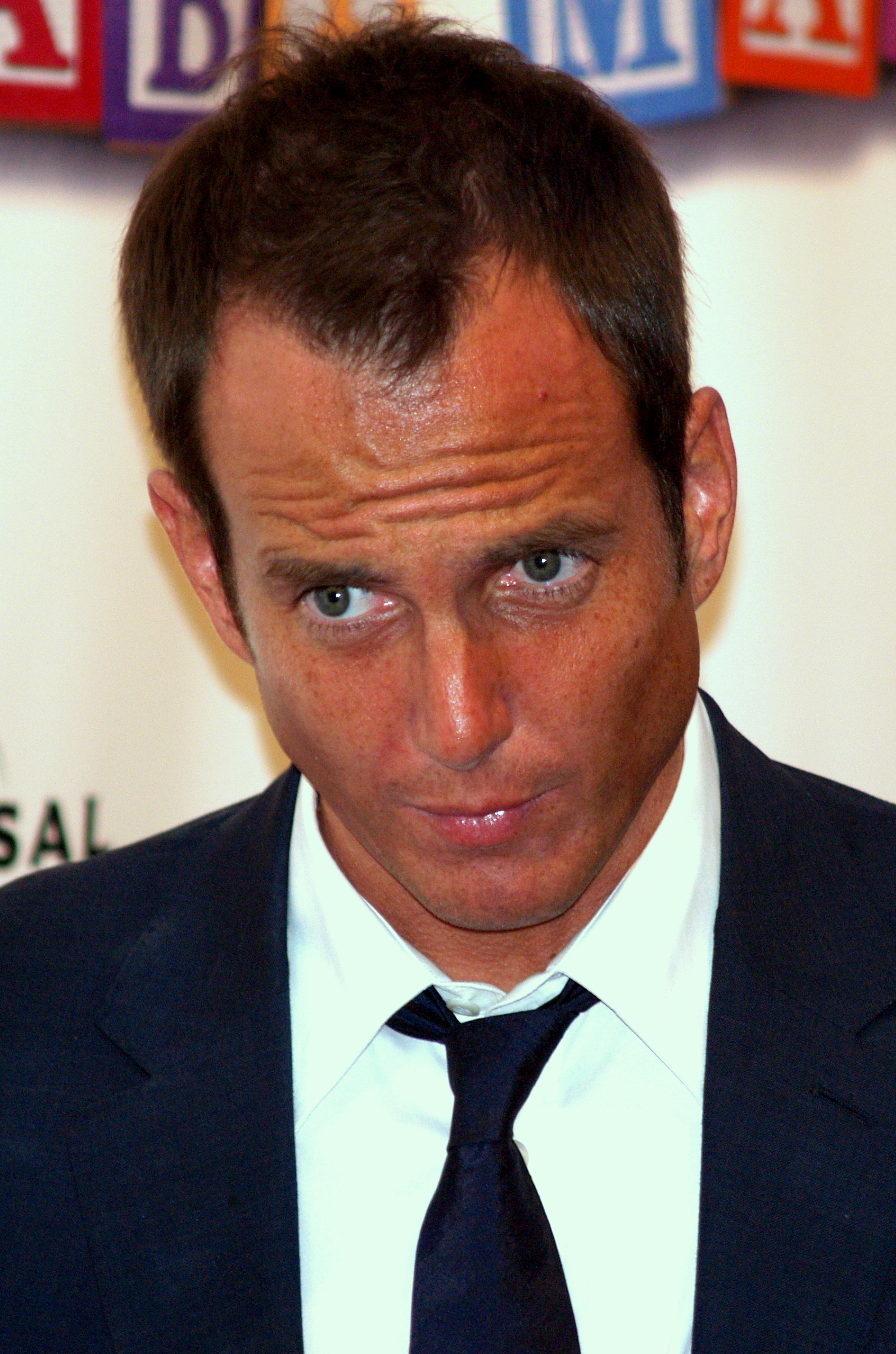
Arnett at the 2008 Tribeca Film Festival

In February 1996, Arnett made his first television pilot with Kevin Pollak and Pollak's wife Lucy Webb for CBS; it was not picked up. In 1999 he appeared in season 2 episode 12 of Sex and the City as Miranda's love interest. Also in 1999, Arnett was in another pilot for The Mike O'Malley Show on NBC as the protagonist's friend Jimmy. The show was picked up, but it was cancelled after two episodes. Arnett has referred to 2000, the year after that show was cancelled, as "the darkest year of [his] life", and he admits that he "didn't get a lot of work" and "drank those years away". In summer 2000, a friend helped pull Arnett out of his battle with alcoholism, and he began to get his career back on track. In 2001, Arnett was cast in the CBS television pilot, Loomis as the slacker brother of a local news reporter (Cheri Oteri), that was not picked up. In 2002, Arnett was cast in a fourth television pilot which was for the CBS sitcom Still Standing, which was picked up and ran for several seasons, but his character was cut from the series after the pilot. Arnett became so frustrated, after his fourth failed pilot, that he "swore off pilots" altogether, until his agent persuaded him to audition for the pilot for Arrested Development. In 2002, prior to Arrested Development, Arnett guest-starred in The Sopranos and Law & Order: Special Victims Unit.

=== 2003–2013: Arrested Development and sitcom roles ===
In 2003, Arnett found mainstream success in television when he played George Oscar "Gob" Bluth II in the Fox comedy series Arrested Development and in 2006 he was nominated for his first Emmy. The show was cancelled after three seasons due to low ratings, despite its critical acclaim and cult following. (He played Max the Magician in Sesame Street, in a nod to Gob Bluth's penchant for using Europe's "The Final Countdown" during his magic shows.) According to a 2006 interview with the Los Angeles Times, Arnett's two favourite episodes of the show were "Pier Pressure" and "Afternoon Delight". His exposure on Arrested Development led to a number of larger roles in feature films. Though having worked in drama, his role for Arrested Development is still comedy, and he often portrays smug antagonists. He "never considered himself a comic" and considers himself an "actor first". In 2006, Arnett starred in his first leading role in Let's Go to Prison, directed by Bob Odenkirk. It earned more than US$4 million at the box office and more than US$13 million in rentals. In Blades of Glory, Arnett and his then-wife Amy Poehler played brother/sister ice-skating pair with an incestuous relationship. The film was No. 1 at the U.S. box office during its first two weeks, and grossed approximately US$118 million domestically during its theatrical run. and US$36 million on home video. He guest-starred in King of the Hill and 30 Rock; in the latter, he played the recurring role of Devon Banks, Jack Donaghy's archnemesis, for which he was nominated for four Emmy Awards for Outstanding Guest Actor in a Comedy Series.

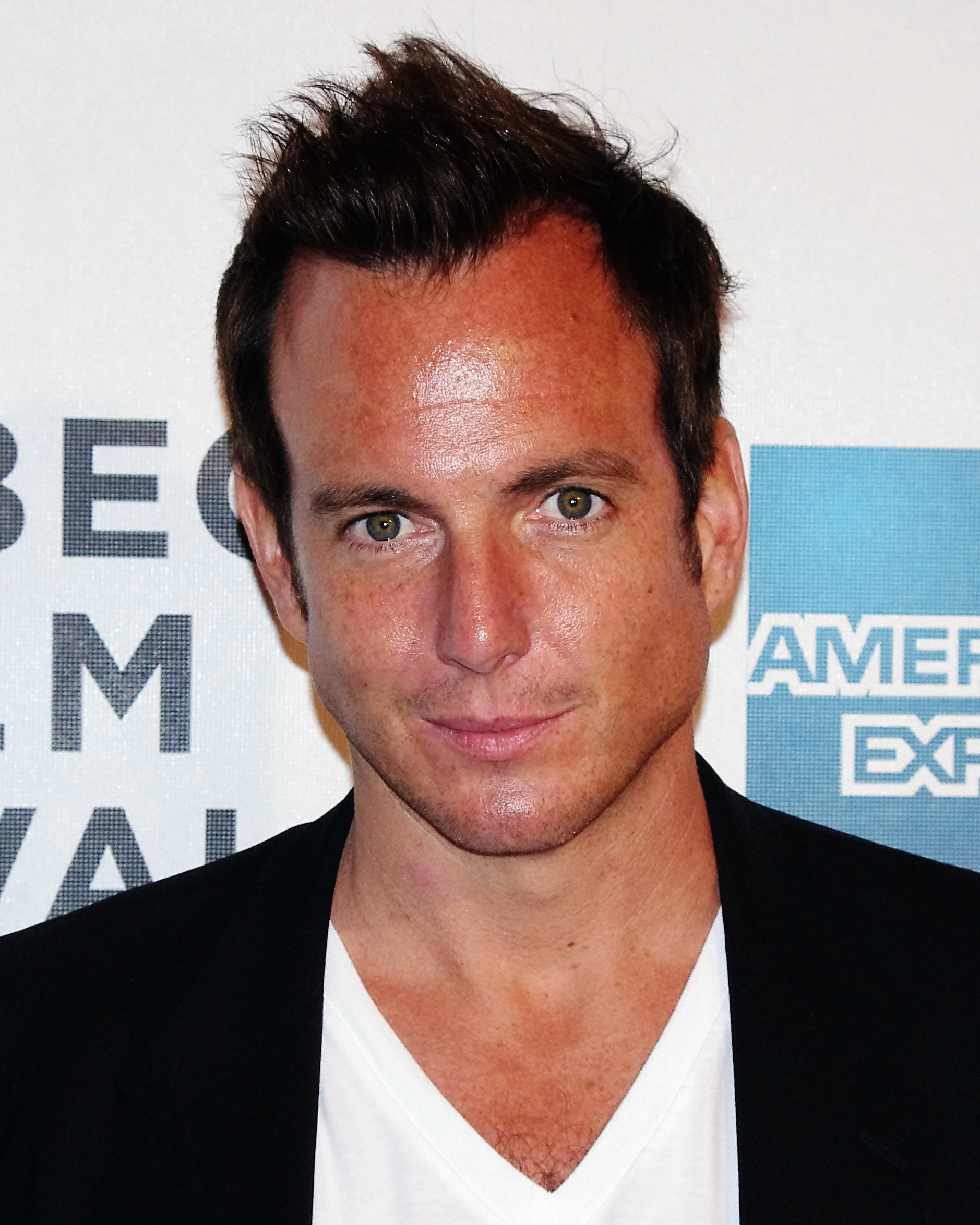
Arnett at the Tribeca Film Festival in 2012

Arnett's distinctive gravelly voice has earned him voice-over work for CBS television promos, film trailers and numerous advertisements, including Lamisil medication. Perhaps most recognizable is Arnett's voice saying, "It's not more than you need, just more than you're used to" in ads for GMC trucks. He has lent his voice to a number of television shows, such as Ghost Writer in the 2005 Nickelodeon's series Danny Phantom, Duncan Schiesst for the Comedy Central animated program Freak Show, which was created by and stars the voice of his Arrested Development co-star David Cross. Arnett was the announcer for the faux trailer "Don't" in the 2007 film Grindhouse, and became announcer for Cartoon Network in October 2008 during its "Noods" era, replacing Greg Cipes. He has voiced characters in animated films, including Vlad in Horton Hears a Who!, The Missing Link in Monsters vs. Aliens, Horst the German sous-chef in Ratatouille, and Mr. Perkins in Despicable Me. He planned to be the voice of the K.I.T.T. in Universal's Knight Rider, a sequel to the popular 1980s television series. The production featured a Ford Mustang as K.I.T.T. Since Arnett had a previous long standing relationship with competitor automaker General Motors as the voice for GMC Trucks commercials, GM asked Arnett to pull out of the project. Arnett opted to withdraw from the project and he was replaced by Val Kilmer. Arnett made a commercial cameo for the video game Call of Duty: Modern Warfare 2.

In 2009, he voiced the title character in Eat Lead: The Return of Matt Hazard, a video game developed by Vicious Cycle Software and starred as an out of work former video game protagonist hoping to make a comeback, versus a greedy game executive played by Neil Patrick Harris. In the Fox animated comedy series Sit Down, Shut Up, he voiced Ennis Hofftard, a bodybuilder who teaches English and always attempts to chase women. The show premiered on April 19, 2009, but was eventually cancelled after several months due to poor ratings. It aired its last episode on November 21, 2009. Arnett played supporting roles in the films Spring Breakdown, Hot Rod, The Comebacks, and On Broadway, where he once again worked with his close friend and director Dave McLaughlin. In The Brothers Solomon, he again teamed with Odenkirk and starred with Saturday Night Live member Will Forte. He appeared in a major supporting role in the basketball comedy Semi-Pro, his second film with Ferrell. He plays Lou Redwood, the commentator of the team, who is "a former player, a bit of a womanizer, and a boozer". On November 17, 2009, it was announced that Arnett would try to win over real-life wife Amy Poehler in a guest spot on Parks and Recreation. Arnett played Chris, an MRI technologist and possible love interest for Poehler's Leslie Knope. Justin Theroux appeared in the same episode as yet another suitor. Arnett signed on for one episode, and the episode entitled "The Set Up" aired January 14, 2010.

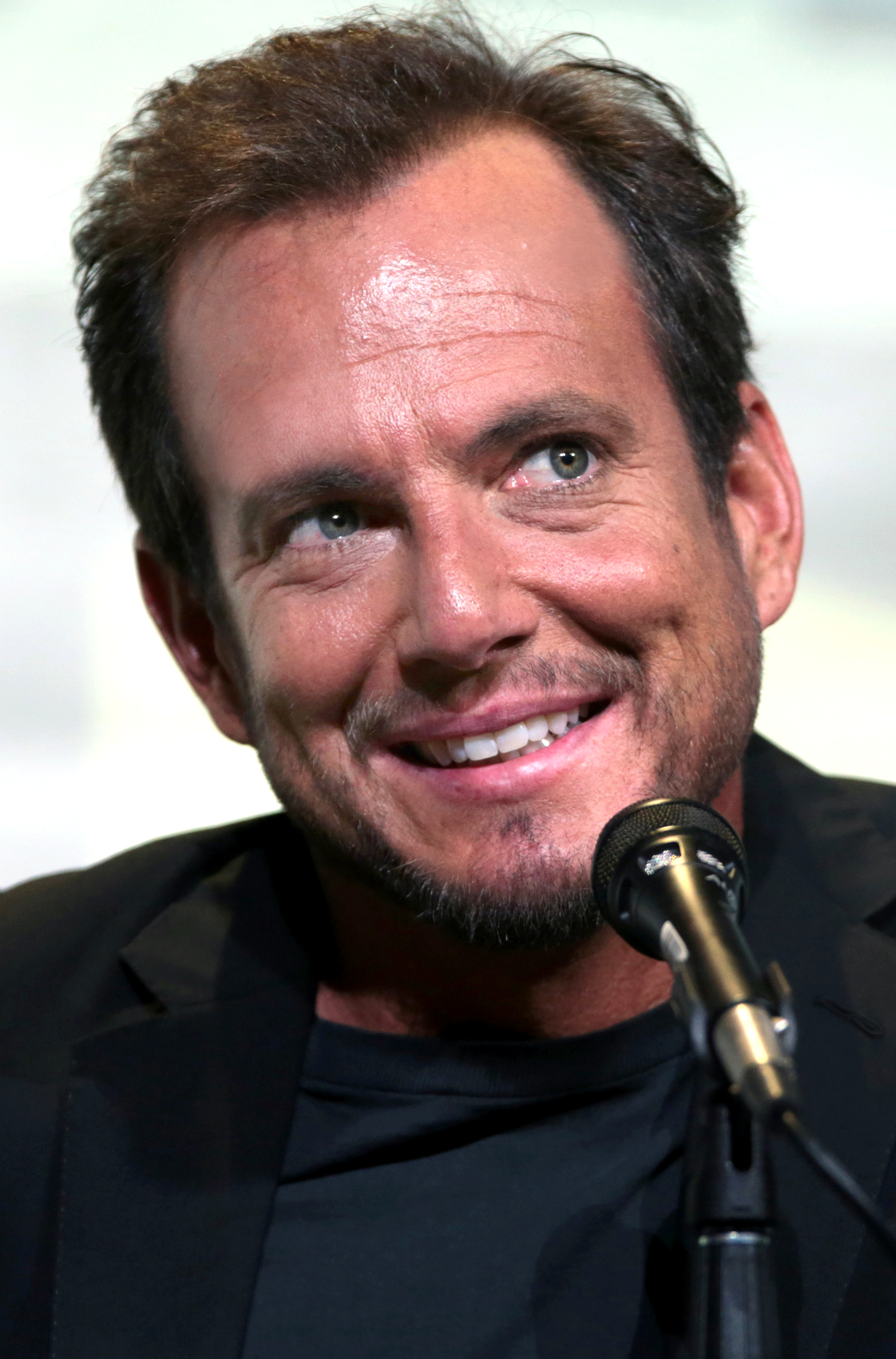
Arnett at the 2016 San Diego Comic-Con promoting The Lego Batman Movie.

In 2010, Arnett and former Arrested Development co-star Jason Bateman created DumbDumb Productions, a production company focusing on digital content. Their first video was "Prom Date", the first in a series of "Dirty shorts" for Orbit. In March 2012, Mansome, Arnett's first executive producer credit with Bateman, was announced as a Spotlight selection for the Tribeca Film Festival. The documentary, directed by Morgan Spurlock, is a comedic look at male identity as it is defined through men's grooming habits featuring celebrity and expert commentary. He starred in Running Wilde which was cancelled in January 2011, due to poor ratings as well as The Increasingly Poor Decisions of Todd Margaret with David Cross. On March 23, 2011, Arnett appeared in the penultimate episode to The Office season 7. Arnett co-starred in the NBC television comedy series Up All Night, about a couple who struggle to balance their home lives (especially with their newborn child) and their work ones. He had been attached to play the lead role of David Miller in the 2013 comedy We're the Millers, but had to pass due to scheduling; the part went to Jason Sudeikis.

=== 2014–present: BoJack Horseman and SmartLess ===
He voiced the eponymous character in the critically acclaimed Netflix animated sitcom BoJack Horseman, which ran from 2014 to 2020. He co-starred as Vern Fenwick in the 2014 film Teenage Mutant Ninja Turtles and its 2016 sequel, Teenage Mutant Ninja Turtles: Out of the Shadows. Arnett starred in the CBS sitcom The Millers, which lasted for two seasons. In 2017, Arnett was cast in the recurring role of Mr. Quagmire on the Netflix comedy drama series A Series of Unfortunate Events. In 2016, he co-created, co-wrote and starred in the Netflix original series Flaked, which received negative reviews from critics.

Arnett lent his voice to Batman in the film The Lego Movie. Arnett reprised the role in The Lego Batman Movie, a spin-off of The Lego Movie released in 2017 as well as The Lego Movie 2: The Second Part, released in 2019. He reprises the role in an episode of the franchise's spinoff animated series Unikitty! titled "BatKitty", which aired days before the release of the film. He is the spokesman of a series of Hulu advertisements and his role in television spots deliberately recalls Devon Banks as a power-hungry manipulator. In July 2020, Arnett, along with Bateman and Sean Hayes, created a comedy and talk podcast called SmartLess.

In 2021, Arnett played The Facts of Life's Dink Lockwood in a reenactment of the third-season episode "Kids Can Be Cruel" for the third edition of Live in Front of a Studio Audience. In December 2021, it was announced that Arnett had replaced Armie Hammer in reshoots in the role of Alex Magnussen in Next Goal Wins due to abuse allegations made against Hammer in January 2021. The part, initially meant as a cameo, was expanded upon when Arnett joined. Cursed Friends, a Comedy Central original movie from Arnett's production company Electric Avenue, was announced in September 2022. Arnett made an appearance in the film. Also in 2022 Arnett starred in the Netflix detective comedy Murderville. Arnett starred in the 2025 film Is This Thing On? alongside Bradley Cooper. Arnett also co-wrote the screenplay while Cooper directed.

== Influences ==
Arnett lists Steve Martin and Chevy Chase as his two biggest comedic influences.

== Personal life ==
Arnett lives in Los Angeles, California, and is a dual citizen of Canada and the United States. He moved to New York City in 1990 and lived there for 20 years. In 2015, Arnett bought property in Beverly Hills and began construction on a new home, which was completed in 2017. In 2021, he sold the custom home and moved to a modern farmhouse in Benedict Canyon.

Arnett has struggled with alcoholism in the past, a topic explored in his shows Flaked and BoJack Horseman. He managed to maintain sobriety for 15 years until a relapse during the production of Flaked. Flaked is in part inspired by Arnett's own struggles with alcoholism. He has attested that Alcoholics Anonymous has played a role in reclaiming sobriety.

=== Relationships and children ===
Arnett has been married twice and has three children. He was married to Penelope Ann Miller for a brief period between 1994 and 1995. The two began dating in November 1994 and married a month later in December 1994. They divorced less than a month later in January 1995.

Arnett began dating Amy Poehler in 2000, four years after their initial encounter in 1996 when he saw her in an Upright Citizens Brigade performance. Arnett and Poehler married on August 29, 2003, and have two sons together. Their first son was born on October 25, 2008, and their second son was born in August 2010. Arnett and Poehler separated in September 2012. In April 2014, Arnett filed for divorce, citing irreconcilable differences. Their divorce was finalized in July 2016.

Arnett began a relationship with Alessandra Brawn in 2019. They have one son together, born in May 2020. They separated in late 2024.

== Filmography ==
=== Film ===
Year	Title	Role	Notes	Ref.
1996	Close Up	Dave		
1996	Ed's Next Move	Weather Video Guy		
1997	The Broken Giant	Ezra Caton		
1999	Southie	Whitey		
1999	The Waiting Game	Lenny		
2000	The Acting Class	Will Bennett		
2001	Series 7: The Contenders	Narrator	Voice	
2005	Monster-in-Law	Kit		
2006	Ice Age: The Meltdown	Lone Gunslinger	Voice	
2006	RV	Todd Mallory		
2006	The Great New Wonderful	Danny	Segment: Emme's Story	
2006	Let's Go to Prison	Nelson Biederman IV		
2006	Wristcutters: A Love Story	Messiah		
2007	Blades of Glory	Stranz Van Waldenberg		
2007	Grindhouse	Announcer	Voice, segment: "Don't"	
2007	On Broadway	Tom		
2007	Ratatouille	Horst	Voice	
2007	Hot Rod	Jonathan Ault		
2007	The Brothers Solomon	John Solomon		
2007	The Comebacks	Mailman		
2008	Semi-Pro	Lou Redwood		
2008	Horton Hears a Who!	Vlad Vladikoff	Voice	
2008	The Rocker	Lex Drennan		
2009	Spring Breakdown	Ted	Direct-to-DVD	
2009	Brief Interviews with Hideous Men	Subject No. 11		
2009	Monsters vs. Aliens	The Missing Link	Voice	
2009	G-Force	Secret Agent Kip Killian		
2010	When in Rome	Antonio Donatelo		
2010	Jonah Hex	Lieutenant Grass		
2010	Despicable Me	Mr. Perkins	Voice	
2012	The Secret World of Arrietty	Pod	Voice, English dub	
2012	Mansome	Himself	Documentary; Producer	
2014	The Nut Job	Surly	Voice	
2014	The Lego Movie	Batman / Bruce Wayne	Voice	
2014	Teenage Mutant Ninja Turtles	Vern Fenwick		
2015	Being Canadian	Himself	Documentary	
2016	Teenage Mutant Ninja Turtles: Out of the Shadows	Vern Fenwick		
2016	Popstar: Never Stop Never Stopping	Main CMZ Reporter		
2017	The Lego Batman Movie	Batman / Bruce Wayne	Voice	
2017	Dark Hoser	Batman / Bruce Wayne	Voice, short film	
2017	Batman is Just Not That Into You	Batman / Bruce Wayne	Voice, short film	
2017	Cooking with Alfred	Batman / Bruce Wayne	Voice, short film	
2017	The Nut Job 2: Nutty by Nature	Surly	Voice	
2018	Show Dogs	Det. Frank Nicholas		
2018	Teen Titans Go! To the Movies	Slade	Voice; also producer	
2019	The Lego Movie 2: The Second Part	Batman / Bruce Wayne	Voice	
2020	Dolittle	Jackrabbit in prison cell	Voice, uncredited	
2021	Rumble	Steve	Voice	
2022	Chip 'n Dale: Rescue Rangers	Sweet Pete	Voice	
2022	Minions: The Rise of Gru	Mr. Perkins	Voice cameo	
2022	G’day, the short film	Louie	Voice, short film	
2023	Next Goal Wins	Alex Magnussen		
2025	Is This Thing On?	Alex Novak	Also writer and producer	
2026	Behemoth! †		Post-Production	

=== Television ===
Year	Title	Role	Notes	Refs
1994	Cybermania '94	Himself (remote host)	Awards show	
1999	Sex and the City	Jack	Episode: "La Douleur Exquise!"	
1999	The Mike O'Malley Show	Jimmy	13 episodes	
2000	Third Watch	Kenny	Episode: "Spring Forward, Fall Back"	
2001	Boston Public	Hand Salesman	Episode: "Chapter Twenty-Nine"	
2002	Yes, Dear	Bobby	Episode: "Johnny Ampleseed"	
2002	The Sopranos	Mike Waldrup	2 episodes	
2002	Law & Order: Special Victims Unit	Tony Damon	Episode: "Angels"	
2003	Undefeated	Scott Green's Assistant	Television film	
2003–2006, 2013, 2018–2019	Arrested Development	George Oscar "G.O.B." Bluth II	82 episodes	
2004	Will & Grace	Artemis Johnson	Episode: "Back Up, Dancer"	
2005	Odd Job Jack	Tiberius McKorkindale	Voice, 2 episodes	
2005	Danny Phantom	Ghost Writer	Voice, episode: "The Fright Before Christmas!"	
2006	Freak Show	Duncan Schiesst	Voice, 7 episodes	
2006	O'Grady	Dougski	Voice, 1 episode	
2006	The X's	Pork E. Bacon	Voice, episode: "From Crusha With Love"	
2007	King of the Hill	Portis	Voice, episode: "Hank Gets Dusted"	
2007–2013	30 Rock	Devon Banks	9 episodes	
2008	Sesame Street	Max the Magician	Episode: "Max the Magician"	
2008	Human Giant	Himself	Episode: "I'm Gonna Live Forever!"	
2009	Sit Down, Shut Up	Ennis Hofftard	Voice, 13 episodes	
2009	Delocated	TV Announcer	Voice, episode: "Good Buds"	
2009	Monsters vs. Aliens: Mutant Pumpkins from Outer Space	The Missing Link	Voice, television film	
2009–2011	Late Night with Jimmy Fallon	Himself/Brett Favre	6 episodes	
2010	Parks and Recreation	Chris	Episode: "The Set Up"	
2010–2011	Running Wilde	Steve Wilde	13 episodes; also co-creator, writer, and executive producer	
2010–2016	The Increasingly Poor Decisions of Todd Margaret	Brent Wilts	17 episodes	
2011	The Office	Fred Henry	Episode: "Search Committee"	
2011–2012	Up All Night	Chris	35 episodes	
2012	The Cleveland Show	General Richter	Voice, episode: "A General Thanksgiving Episode"	
2012	Comedy Bang! Bang!	Dale	Episode: "Seth Rogen Wears a Plaid Shirt & Brown Pants"	
2013, 2015	The Late Late Show	Himself (Guest host)	3 episodes	
2013–2014	The Millers	Nathan Miller	34 episodes	
2014	The Simpsons	Deputy Director Gratman	Voice, episode: "Steal This Episode"	
2014–2020	BoJack Horseman	BoJack Horseman / Additional voices	Voice, 76 episodes; also executive producer	
2014	Wander Over Yonder	Ryder	Voice, episode: "The Rider"	
2016–2017	Flaked	Chip	14 episodes; also co-creator, writer, executive producer, and director	
2016	Unbreakable Kimmy Schmidt	Kitty	Voice; episode: "Kimmy Kidnaps Gretchen!"; uncredited	
2017	A Series of Unfortunate Events	Father/Mr. Quagmire	8 episodes	
2017	Jimmy Kimmel Live!	Himself (guest host)	1 episode	
2017	Minecon Earth 2017	Himself (co-host)	YouTube live show	
2017	Netflix: LIVE	Himself (host)	Netflix special	
2017–2018	The Gong Show	Himself (guest judge)	5 episodes; also executive producer	
2017	The Magic School Bus Rides Again	Galapagos Gil	Voice, episode: "Frizzle Of The Future"	
2017–2019	Hot Date	Sam Keurig	Episode: "For Real, Where Have All My Friends Gone?"; also executive producer	
2018	The Guest Book	Rob	Episode: "Under Cover"	
2019	Unikitty!	Bruce Wayne / Batman / Batkitty	Voice, episode: "Batkitty"	
2019	Riviera	Jeff Carter	10 episodes	
2020–present	LEGO Masters	Himself (host)	Also executive producer	
2020	The First Team	Mark Crane	4 episodes	
2021	All or Nothing: Toronto Maple Leafs	Himself (narrator)	Voice, 5 episodes	
2021	Muppets Haunted Mansion	Ghost Host	Television special	
2021	Live in Front of a Studio Audience	Dink Lockwood	Episode: "Diff'rent Strokes and The Facts of Life"	
2021–2025	The Morning Show	Doug Klassen	4 episodes	
2022	Murderville	Senior Detective Terry Seattle	7 episodes; also executive producer	
2022	Our Flag Means Death	Calico Jack	Episode: "We Gull Way Back"	
2022	Island of the Sea Wolves	Himself (narrator)	3 episodes; Netflix documentary series	
2023–2024	Mulligan	Various	Voice, 3 episodes	
2023–present	Twisted Metal	Marcus "Needles" Kane / Sweet Tooth	Main voice role; also executive producer	
2025	Super Team Canada	Breakaway	Main voice role	

=== Video games ===
Year	Title	Role	Ref.
2009	Eat Lead: The Return of Matt Hazard	Matt Hazard	
2009	Monsters vs. Aliens	The Missing Link	
2009	Call of Duty: Modern Warfare 2	Sgt. Arnett	
2015	Lego Dimensions	Bruce Wayne / Batman (The LEGO Batman Movie), Excalibur Batman	
2022	Tiny Tina's Wonderlands	Dragon Lord	

== Awards and nominations ==
Organizations	Year	Category	Work	Result	Ref.
American Comedy Award	2014	Best Comedy Supporting Actor – TV	Arrested Development	Nominated	
Annie Awards	2019	Outstanding Voice Acting in an Animated Series	BoJack Horseman	Won	
Canadian Screen Awards	2026	Best Animated Program or Series	Super Team Canada with Alex Cichon, Joel Bradley, Joel H. Cohen, Robert Cohen, Jennifer Twiner McCarron	Won	
Canadian Screen Awards	2026	Best Voice Performance	Super Team Canada	Won	
Critics' Choice Super Awards	2021	Best Voice Actor in an Animated Series	Bojack Horseman	Won	
Golden Globes	2026	Best Podcast	SmartLess	Nominated	
Kids' Choice Award	2015	Favorite Movie Actor	The Lego Movie	Nominated	
Kids' Choice Award	2015	Favorite Movie Actor	Teenage Mutant Ninja Turtles	Nominated	
Kids' Choice Award	2017	Favorite Movie Actor	Teenage Mutant Ninja Turtles: Out of the Shadows	Nominated	
MTV Movie & TV Awards	2017	Best Comedic Performance	The Lego Batman Movie	Nominated	
Primetime Emmy Award	2006	Outstanding Supporting Actor in a Comedy Series	Arrested Development (episode: "Making a Stand" + "S.O.B.s")	Nominated	
Primetime Emmy Award	2008	Outstanding Guest Actor in a Comedy Series	30 Rock (episode: "Jack Gets in the Game")	Nominated	
Primetime Emmy Award	2010	Outstanding Guest Actor in a Comedy Series	30 Rock (episode: "Into the Crevasse")	Nominated	
Primetime Emmy Award	2011	Outstanding Guest Actor in a Comedy Series	30 Rock (episode: "Plan B")	Nominated	
Primetime Emmy Award	2012	Outstanding Guest Actor in a Comedy Series	30 Rock (episode: "Idiots Are People Three!")	Nominated	
Primetime Emmy Award	2019	Outstanding Animated Program	BoJack Horseman (episode: "Free Churro")	Nominated	
Primetime Emmy Award	2020	Outstanding Animated Program	BoJack Horseman (episode: "The View from Halfway Down")	Nominated	
Satellite Award	2012	Best Actor – Television Series Musical or Comedy	Up All Night	Nominated	
Screen Actors Guild Award	2004	Outstanding Ensemble in a Comedy Series	Arrested Development	Nominated	
Screen Actors Guild Award	2005	Outstanding Ensemble in a Comedy Series	Arrested Development	Nominated	
Screen Actors Guild Award	2013	Outstanding Ensemble in a Comedy Series	Arrested Development	Nominated	
Teen Choice Awards	2017	Choice Comedy Movie Actor	The Lego Batman Movie	Nominated	
TV Land Award	2004	Future Classic Award (Shared with cast and producers)	Arrested Development	Won	

== Honors and recognition ==
In April 2007, during a panel hosted by The Paley Center for Media, talk show host Conan O'Brien and his writing staff named Will Arnett as one of their three all-time favourite guests, sharing the honour with fellow Canadians Norm Macdonald and Harland Williams.

Organizations	Year	Award	Result	Ref.
New York magazine	2005	"New Yorkers of the Year"	Honored	
Entertainment Weekly	2007	"Future King of Comedy"	Honored	
Best Week Ever	2007	"Top 15 Sexiest Nerd Boys"	Honored	
Premiere magazine	2007	"The 20 Hottest New Faces in Comedy"	Honored	
Canada Walk of Fame	2019	Entertainment Walk of Fame	Honored	
Savannah Film Festival	2025	Luminary Award	Honored	
