= Lance Greene =

American actor

Lance Greene is an American actor from Boston, Massachusetts.

== Career ==
Greene appeared in John Wells' film The Company Men opposite Ben Affleck and Tommy Lee Jones. He starred as Billy O’Toole in On Broadway, an independent film shot in Boston, acting opposite Mike O’Malley, Joey McInytyre, Eliza Dushku, Will Arnett and Amy Poehler. He appeared in Southie and War of Chinas Fate, a World War II film shot on location in China. He played troubled twin brothers Aidan and Terry O’Toole in Back to Before by On Broadway writer/director Dave McLaughlin at the Boston Center for the Arts with Robert Wahlberg. He acted in the original theater production of God Willing at The Burren in Davis Square and later produced the play in New York City. Greene was the lead in the short film Killing Time and played a Harvard University graduate trapped in a cab with a person he put behind bars in the short film Downtown produced by Ed Burns.

== Filmography ==
=== Film ===
Year	Title	Role	Notes
1998	Southie	Track Guy #1	
2007	On Broadway	Billy O'Toole	
2007	Shoots & Ladders	Jason O'Malley	
2010	The Company Men	Landry	
2013	R.I.P.D.	R.I.P.D. Cop	
2013	Frank the Bastard	Eddie Gast	
