= Unless Something Goes Terribly Wrong =

Unless Something Goes Terribly Wrong is a 73-minute 2025 documentary by Kaitlyn Schwalje (director and screenwriter) and Alexander Wolf Lewis (director). It explores the state of America's ageing infrastructure by spending time with the staff inside a wastewater treatment plant in Portland, Maine and examining their struggles with ageing equipment, forever chemicals, and a public that doesn't comprehend all that goes into keeping our environment clean. It won the Audience Award at the 2025 Camden International Film Festival and the Audience Choice – Documentary Award at the 2025 New Hampshire Film Festival.

== Release ==
The film premiered in Portland in November 2025.

== Reception ==
Maine Public called it "a buddy comedy about poop and the thankless pursuit of making a better world." The Portland Press Herald wrote that the film "highlight(ed) the dedication and humor needed by its workers to keep the city’s water clean."

"Rather, the film focuses on a confrontation with the effects our lives have: the waste we create, and the strain of getting rid of it. It reminds us that all things deteriorate, malfunction, and inevitably stop working. Someone has to be there to mop up the shit when the pipes inevitably burst", noted the Maine Play Week podcast.
