= The Company Men =

2010 film by John Wells

- Theatrical release poster
- Directed by: John Wells
- Written by: John Wells
- Produced by: John Wells; Paula Weinstein; Claire Rudnick Polstein
- Starring: Ben Affleck; Chris Cooper; Kevin Costner; Tommy Lee Jones; Maria Bello; Rosemarie DeWitt; Craig T. Nelson
- Cinematography: Roger Deakins
- Edited by: Robert Frazen
- Music by: Aaron Zigman
- Production companies: The Weinstein Company; Battle Mountain Films; Spring Creek Productions
- Distributed by: The Weinstein Company (United States); IM Global (International)
- Release dates: January 22, 2010 (Sundance); January 21, 2011 (United States)
- Running time: 114 minutes
- Country: United States
- Language: English
- Budget: $15 million
- Box office: $8.1 million

The Company Men is a 2010 American drama film, written and directed by John Wells. It features Ben Affleck, Kevin Costner, Chris Cooper, and Tommy Lee Jones.

It premiered at the 26th Sundance Film Festival on January 22, 2010 and had a one-week run in December 10, 2010 to be eligible for the year's Academy Awards. The movie was released commercially in the United States and Canada on January 21, 2011.

== Plot ==
When the publicly held shipbuilding corporation Global Transportation Systems, or GTX, is downsized in the midst of the recession, many employees are fired, including Bobby Walker. Walker is a white-collar, corporate ladder-climbing employee with a six-figure salary, a wife, a teenage son, and a younger daughter.

Walker gets outplacement services from GTX but, without success, gradually loses luxuries such as his country club membership and his Porsche. He finally resorts to selling his expensive house (with a large mortgage) and moves his family in with his parents. Ultimately, Walker is forced to take a manual labor job working for his blue-collar brother-in-law, Jack Dolan, renovating a home.

Executive Vice President Gene McClary challenges GTX CEO James Salinger and his strategy of employee cutbacks, questioning the ethics of spending money to build new corporate headquarters while laying off employees. Angry at being questioned by McClary, his longtime friend, college roommate, and first employee, Salinger asserts that the deep cuts are necessary to increase profits, to increase the stock price and discourage a rumored hostile takeover of the company.

Later, it is determined that an additional round of lay-offs is necessary. Senior manager Phil Woodward, who, over the course of 30 years, had risen from the factory floor to the corporate offices (a decidedly rare accomplishment), is also fired. When McClary demands that senior HR manager Sally Wilcox, who is also his mistress, rehire Woodward immediately, she tells him that he, too, is being fired. He soon leaves his wife and moves in with Sally.

Woodward's life quickly falls apart as employer after employer tells him he is either too old to start a new career, or too old to do jobs that those half his age find difficult. At his wife's request, Woodward goes out every morning as usual with his briefcase to keep his situation secret from the neighbors, but he cannot do anything to abate his mounting bills or his daughter's impending college tuition bill. Frustrated and depressed, he commits suicide in his garage by carbon-monoxide poisoning.

Despite McClary's anger, he has become even wealthier as a shareholder of the firm because the value of his GTX stock options has increased due to the company's downsizing. Yet he feels guilty about his company ruining so many lives and wants to put people to work. Feeling the need for a change, he starts his own business in maritime shipbuilding, the previous specialty of GTX. Walker is the first person he hires.

Walker arrives at the bare offices to help start a new business composed of many former GTX employees.

== Cast ==
- Ben Affleck as Bobby Walker
- Tommy Lee Jones as Gene McClary
- Chris Cooper as Phil Woodward
- Kevin Costner as Jack Dolan
- Rosemarie DeWitt as Maggie Walker
- Maria Bello as Sally Wilcox
- Craig T. Nelson as James Salinger
- Eamonn Walker as Danny
- Nancy Villone as Diane Lindstrom
- Tom Kemp as Conal Doherty
- Dana Eskelson as Diedre Dolan
- Patricia Kalember as Cynthia McClary
- Cady Huffman as Joanna
- Anthony O'Leary as Drew Walker
- Angela Rezza as Carson Walker
- Kent Shocknek as Herb Rittenour
- Tonye Patano as Joyce Robertson
- Kathy Harum as Karen
- Lance Greene as Dick Landry
- Maryann Plunkett as Lorna

== Production ==
The Company Men is directed by John Wells in his feature film debut. He also wrote the screenplay and produced the film. The project was first announced in January 2008 by the newly formed production company Berk/Lane Entertainment. In September 2008, actor Ben Affleck joined the cast. By March 2009, actors Kevin Costner and Tommy Lee Jones joined the cast. Production began the following month, April 2009, in Boston, Massachusetts. It was completed in June 2009. Partial filming for the production occurred in the Roxbury neighborhood of Boston and also in the Boston suburbs of Burlington, Wellesley, Framingham, Marblehead, and the Quincy shipyard.

== Release ==
The Company Men had its world premiere at the 26th Sundance Film Festival on January 26, 2010. The film was purchased by The Weinstein Company, which committed to print and advertising commitment and a theatrical release in the United States and Canada in a mid-seven figure deal.

The film had a minimal release in Los Angeles and New York City on December 10, 2010. The release lasted a week to become eligible for nominations for the 83rd Academy Awards. It had a limited release in 106 theaters in the United States and Canada on January 21, 2011.

== Critical reception ==
The Company Men has received generally positive reviews. Review aggregation website Rotten Tomatoes reports that 67% of critics have given the film a positive review based on 162 reviews, with an average score of 6.4/10. The website's consensus reads, "It might be hard for most viewers to identify with The Company Men's well-heeled protagonists, but writer/director John Wells uses their plight to make universally resonant points — and gets the most out of his excellent cast." On Metacritic, the film achieved an average score of 69 out of 100, based on 34 critics, indicating "generally favorable reviews".

Many critics praised the film for telling a story that reflects the economic climate of the United States in the first decade of the 2000s. Rex Reed of The New York Observer stated the film "does a piercing job of making you feel the dehumanizing effects that losing a job can have on grown men, but it's more truthful and devastating than that." Stephen Holden of The New York Times also notes parallels between the 2009 film Up in the Air and praised the performances from Affleck, Jones and Cooper. Chicago Tribune's Michael Phillips praised the cast, but criticized the story, saying that the actual status of the economic climate "demands a tougher, gutsier script."

The film was named one of the best films of 2010 by David Denby of The New Yorker.
