= Sean Lawlor =

Irish character actor and playwright

- Born: 25 January 1954; Dublin, Ireland
- Died: 10 October 2009 (aged 55); Dublin, Ireland
- Occupation(s): Actor and playwright

Sean Lawlor (25 January 1954 – 10 October 2009) was an Irish character actor and playwright. He was best known for his portrayal of Malcolm Wallace in Braveheart. He also appeared in Titanic, In the Name of the Father and On Broadway. He appeared in many Irish television films and the RTÉ series Bracken, as well as parts in many Irish films. He produced plays for the stage including his own one-man play, The Watchman, in which he starred.

== Death ==
Lawlor died after a short illness in Dublin on 10 October 2009, aged 55.

== Filmography ==
- By the Sword Divided (1983) - Lt. O'Farrell
- Minder (1984, TV Series) - Eddie
- Bergerac (1985, TV Series) - Martin O'Brien
- Boon (1986) - Sean Mahoney
- Taffin (1988) - Seamus
- Reefer and the Model (1988) - Spider
- Joyriders (1988) - Thug in Men's Room
- Murder in Eden (1991, BBC Miniseries) - Rory Rua
- Into the West (1992) - Policeman
- In the Name of the Father (1993) - Remand Prison Officer
- Braveheart (1995) - Malcolm Wallace
- Trojan Eddie (1996) - Gerry
- Some Mother's Son (1996) - Platoon Leader
- Space Truckers (1996) - Mel
- The Disappearance of Finbar (1996) - Michael Flynn
- JAG (1997, TV Series) - Jack Moore
- The Second Civil War (1997, TV Movie) - Brendan
- Titanic (1997) - Leading Stroker Charles Hendrickson (uncredited)
- Chicago Hope (1998, TV Series) - Scotty
- Night Man (1998, TV Series)
- Nash Bridges (1998, TV Series) - Patrick McQuiston
- Winchell (1998, TV Movie) - Miami Sergeant
- Murder, She Wrote: The Celtic Riddle (2003, TV Movie) - John Herlihy
- Red Roses and Petrol (2003) - Prof. Thompson
- On Broadway (2007) - Martin O'Toole
- The Blue Rose (2007) - Harry (uncredited)
- 30,000 Leagues Under the Sea (2007, V) - Captain Nemo
- Live Fast, Die Young (2008) - Sidney Blackstone
- Mega Shark Versus Giant Octopus (2009, V) - Lamar Sanders
- The Black Waters of Echo's Pond (2009) - Charles
- Now Here (2010) - Durant
- Not Another Not Another Movie (2011) - Wallace (final film role)
