= Kris Meyer =

American film and television producer (born 1969)

New Hampshire Film Festival New Hampshire Film FestivalPlimpton! Starring George Plimpton as HimselfPlimpton! Starring George Plimpton as Himself

Kris Meyer is an American film and television producer.

== Early life ==
Hailing from Boston, Massachusetts, Meyer grew up an avid film fan. He comes from a long family line of Boston firefighters. His mother, a union waitress until the age of forty-five, went on to receive her Bachelor’s Degree and then Master’s after raising Kris and his siblings. His father is a former Boston Fire Chief and Vietnam Veteran. They’re a family of four generations of U.S. Marines. He attended Boston College High School and then Boston College, graduating in 1991 as a double eagle. Upon graduation, he relocated to California to pursue a career in the movie industry.

== Career ==
Throughout his career Kris Meyer has worked under The Farrelly Brothers and their production banner Conundrum Entertainment as a creative executive, production executive and producer on such blockbuster hits as “There's Something About Mary (1998),” “Me, Myself & Irene,” “Shallow Hal,” “Fever Pitch (2005)”, “Hall Pass (2011)”, “The Three Stooges” and “Dumb and Dumber To” resulting in over $2 billion in box office sales. Meyer also produced many national/global and regional tv spots: 2008's Dropkick Murphys, State of Massachusetts MTV music video, 2012's Super Bowl commercial for Samsung Galaxy Note, Shields MRI's Tom Brady, UK McDonald's among others.

While filming Fever Pitch in 2004, Meyer met Luis Tiant. Tiant shared with Meyer his dream to return to Cuba, Tiant's birth country. Tiant had been trying to return on his own, and Meyer offered to help Tiant with hopes that a film crew could travel with him and film the journey. Under the guise of a goodwill baseball team, Tiant and the crew entered Cuba. The documentary, The Lost Son of Havana premiered at the Tribeca Film Festival on April 23, 2009. Geoff Edgars, a Boston Globe writer, said of the film:

More than a travelogue, the film tells of Tiant's two loves, for his homeland and the pitcher's mound. Baseball is threaded seamlessly through a series of vintage clips and interviews with, among others, former Sox stars Carlton Fisk and Carl Yastrzemski, who were his teammates.

The Lost Son of Havana was nominated by The National Academy of Arts and Television Sciences for a 2010 Sports Emmy Award.

The Do-Over opened up May 27, 2016, on Netflix. Meyer was an Executive Producer along with Adam Sandler for the Netflix original movie that starred Sandler himself alongside David Spade and Paula Patton. Meyer also Executive Produced Super Troopers sequel Super Troopers 2.

In 2020, Kris Meyer co-founded MuddHouse Media, a podcast network which offers a diverse selection of shows within entertainment, sports, media and more. The company is currently partnered with Patrick McEnroe and Kevin Youkilis, among others, with new podcasts rolling out each week. Muddhouse Media has been featured on national media outlets such as the Today Show and MLB Network.

During 2021, Kris co-founded SKTLS.com, a non-profit crypto token with the mission to clean up space debris. SKTLS air drop was held on May 6, 2022 on (National Space Day).

Mr. Meyer also serves on board and advisor roles in multiple sectors including Biotech, CyberSecurity and Education.

On May 13, 2023, Kris gave the Fisher College commencement speech whilst receiving an Honorary Doctor of Humane Letters.

His next film is the children's animated film, Pierre the Pigeon-Hawk starring will.i.am, Snoop, Luis Guzman, Jennifer Hudson, Jennifer Coolidge, Howie Mandel and 21Down starring Ashley Judd, Dylan Walsh and Richard T.Jones late 2026 releases.

== Awards ==
In 2010, Meyer was the first recipient of the "Ruffled Feather Award" for excellence in film at the Plymouth Rock Comedy Festival.

On Broadway won the Audience chosen Best Feature award at the Woods Hole Film Festival, the Grand Jury Prize for Best Film in the New Hampshire Film Festival and had six nominations in the Hoboken Film Festival. At the 2007 Phoenix Film Festival On Broadway won the Sundance Channel Audience Award for Best Film.

Lost Son Of Havana won the award for Best Film at the Baseball Hall of Fame Film Festival in 2009. When asked for comment on the win Meyer said "It has been an incredible honor to make a film about one of baseball's legends, and to screen it in Cooperstown at the Baseball Film Festival and to win it is just icing on the cake."

"Plimpton!" Starring George Plimpton as Himself" 2012 aired on PBS/American Masters Series. The New York Times, placed the film on their “Best films of the past 25 years” list, singled out the film for depicting Plimpton’s story in a unique approach that mirrored his work and outlook on life.
