= The Mike O'Malley Show =

1999 NBC sitcom

- Genre: Sitcom
- Created by: Les Firestein; Mike O'Malley
- Written by: Dana Gould; Les Firestein; Mike O'Malley
- Directed by: James Widdoes
- Starring: Mike O'Malley; Mark Rosenthal; Will Arnett; Kate Walsh; Missy Yager; Kerry O'Malley
- Theme music composer: Buffalo Tom
- Composer: John Dickson
- Country of origin: United States
- Original language: English
- No. of seasons: 1
- No. of episodes: 13 (11 unaired)

Production
- Executive producers: Mike O'Malley; Les Firestein; Tom Brady; James Widdoes; Michael Mariano; Heide Perlman
- Producer: Werner Walian
- Camera setup: Multi-camera
- Running time: 30 minutes
- Production companies: Bulabos; Jay Gatz Productions; NBC Studios

Original release
- Network: NBC
- Release: September 21 – September 28, 1999

The Mike O'Malley Show is an American sitcom on NBC that aired two episodes. The series star, Mike O'Malley, created and executive produced the series with Les Firestein.

== Synopsis ==
Mike (Mike O'Malley), a 30-year-old hockey enthusiast who lives with his friend Weasel (Mark Rosenthal) in New Haven, Connecticut. After attending the wedding of his friend Jimmy (Will Arnett), Mike begins to reassess his life and decides it's time to grow up.

Before the series hit the air, the pilot was retaped when it was panned by critics. Upon airing, the series received bad reviews and low ratings. After airing two episodes of the thirteen produced, NBC canceled the series.

== Cast ==
- Mike O'Malley as Mike
- Missy Yager as Shawna
- Mark Rosenthal as Weasel
- Kerry O'Malley as Kerry
- Kate Walsh as Marcia
- Will Arnett as Jimmy Nelson

== Episodes ==
No.	Title	Directed by	Written by	Original release date	Prod. code
1	"Pilot"	James Widdoes	Mike O'Malley & Les Firestein	September 21, 1999	001
2	"Out of Their League"	Henry Winkler	Dana Gould	September 28, 1999	005
3	"The Bachelor Party"	James Widdoes	Paul A. Kaplan & Mark Torgove	UNAIRED	004
4	"Pat on the Back"	Bob Saget	Jack Burditt & Michael Mariano	UNAIRED	002
5	"Greta Life"	James Widdoes	Paul A. Kaplan & Mark Torgove	UNAIRED	003
6	"Mike Plus One"	James Widdoes	Jack Burditt	UNAIRED	008
7	"The Anniversary Show"	Chris Parnell	Tom Brady	UNAIRED	007
8	"Full Disclosure"	James Widdoes	Story by : Heide Perlman; Teleplay by : Dan Cross and David Hoge	UNAIRED	006
