= Kerry O'Malley =

American actress (born 1969)

- Born: September 5, 1969 (age 57); Nashua, New Hampshire, U.S.
- Occupation: Actress
- Years active: 1993–present

Kerry O'Malley (born September 5, 1969) is an American actress. She starred in the 2002 Broadway revival of Into the Woods, for which she received a Drama Desk Award nomination. She played a supporting role in the David Fincher film The Killer (2023).

== Early life ==
O'Malley was born in Nashua, New Hampshire. She is the sister of Mike O'Malley, with whom she starred in the short-lived sitcom The Mike O'Malley Show. She graduated from Duke University and the American Repertory Theatre Institute for Advanced Theatre Training at Harvard University.

== Career ==
O'Malley began her career appearing on various stage productions. In 1998 she received Joseph Jefferson Award nomination for Best Actress in a Principal Role in a Musical for Elmer Gantry at the Marriott Theatre in Chicago, Illinois. She performed on Off-Broadway and Broadway, notable playing Baker's Wife in the 2002 Broadway revival of Into the Woods, for which she received a Drama Desk Award nomination. On television, O'Malley was regular cast member on the short-lived sitcoms Costello (1998) and The Mike O'Malley Show (1999). She made her big screen debut in the 1998 crime drama film Rounders. She later appeared in films The Happening (2008), Case 39 (2009), Side Effects (2013), Earth to Echo (2014), Annabelle (2014), Terminator Genisys (2015) and Annabelle: Creation (2017).

On television, O'Malley made guest-starring appearances on Law & Order, Law & Order: Special Victims Unit, NYPD Blue, The King of Queens, My Name Is Earl, Monk, Criminal Minds, The Mentalist, Hart of Dixie, Masters of Sex and Grey's Anatomy. She had recurring roles on Brotherhood, Boardwalk Empire, Shameless, Strange Angel, Snowpiercer and Why Women Kill. In 2017 she starred in the short-lived crime drama Those Who Kill.

In 2023, O'Malley starred in the action thriller film The Killer directed by David Fincher, receiving positive reviews for her performance. In 2024 she appeared in the thriller film Mea Culpa directed by Tyler Perry.

== Filmography ==
=== Film ===
Year	Title	Role	Notes
1996	Gall Force: Eternal Story	Various voices	English dub
1998	Rounders	Kelly	
2008	The Happening	Woman on Cell Phone	
2009	Case 39	Margaret Sullivan	
2009	The Flying Scissors	Amy Stevens	
2013	Side Effects	Ward Psychiatrist	Uncredited
2014	Earth to Echo	Janice Douglas	
2014	Annabelle	Sharon Higgins	
2015	Terminator Genisys	Kyle's Mom	
2017	Annabelle: Creation	Sharon Higgins	
2021	The Little Things	Mrs. Roberts	Uncredited
2023	The Killer	Dolores	
2024	Mea Culpa	Azalia Hawthorne	
2024	Nightbitch	Mother's Mother	
2024	The Six Triple Eight	Mildred	

=== Television ===
Year	Title	Role	Notes
1996	Sky Dancers	Jade (voice)	27 episodes; English dub
1996–1999	Law & Order	Leslie Merrick / Millie Sheridan Bender	2 episodes
1997	NYPD Blue	Uniform #1	Episode: "All's Well That Ends Well"
1997	Brooklyn South	Sherry	Episode: "Touched by a Checkered Cab"
1998	Costello	Trish Donnelly	5 episodes
1999	The Mike O'Malley Show	Kerry	2 episodes
2004	Without a Trace	April	Episode: "Doppelgänger"
2004	Charmed	Nurse Ann	Episode: "It's a Bad, Bad, Bad, Bad World (Part 2)"
2005	The King of Queens	Anna	Episode: "Slippery Slope"
2006	My Name Is Earl	Sergeant Nancy	Episode: "Stole a Badge"
2006	Law & Order: Special Victims Unit	Megan Carlisle	Episode: "Confrontation"
2006–2008	Brotherhood	Mary Kate Martinson	22 episodes
2007	Kidnapped	Operator's Wife	Episode: "Front Page"
2008	Monk	Susan Donovan	Episode: "Mr. Monk Joins a Cult"
2010	Cold Case	Suzie Hill '10	Episode: "Almost Paradise"
2010	Past Life	Jackie Matthews	Episode: "Running on Empty"
2010	Criminal Minds	Kendra Sayer	Episode: "Safe Haven"
2010	Bones	Claire Casper	Episode: "The Shallow in the Deep"
2011	Detroit 1-8-7	Audrey Wiler	Episode: "Legacy/Drag City"
2011	The Mentalist	Vivian Griswold	Episode: "Redacted"
2011	Law & Order: LA	Alice Darnell	Episode: "Westwood"
2011–2013	Hart of Dixie	Beverly Mayfair / Zombie #2	3 episodes
2011–2014	Shameless	Kate	17 episodes
2012	The Whole Truth	Renee Dentzer	Episode: "Cold Case"
2012	Harry's Law	Mrs. Donner	Episode: "The Contest"
2012	Boardwalk Empire	Edwina Shearer	4 episodes
2012	666 Park Avenue	Nurse Potter	Episode: "What Ever Happened to Baby Jane?"
2014	Rizzoli & Isles	Mrs. Osmanski	Episode: "Just Push Play"
2014	Those Who Kill	Mia Vogel	10 episodes
2014	Masters of Sex	Bee Faunce	Episode: "Dirty Jobs"
2014–2017	Survivor's Remorse	Savannah Couronis / Mrs. Moscowitz	3 episodes
2015	Backstrom	Janet Larimer	Episode: "Love Is a Rose and You Better Not Pick It"
2016	Second Chance	Betty	Episode: "When You Have to Go There, They Have to Take You In"
2016	Major Crimes	Karen Chase	Episode: "Moral Hazard"
2016–2017	The Last Tycoon	Kay Maloney	7 episodes
2017	Wet Hot American Summer: Ten Years Later	Darla	2 episodes
2017	Chicago Med	Judith Cutler	Episode: "Speak Your Truth"
2018	Modern Family	Dr. Perry	Episode: "CHiPs and Salsa"
2018–2019	Strange Angel	Mrs. Byrne	8 episodes
2019	The Orville	Floratta	Episode: "Home"
2019	Blue Bloods	Lydia Forman	Episode: "Another Look"
2020	Young Sheldon	Fran	Episode: "Pasadena"
2020	Snowpiercer	Lilah Folger	8 episodes
2020	The Comey Rule	Angry Mom (Women's March)	Episode: "Night Two"
2021	Why Women Kill	Mavis	8 episodes
2021	Heels	Paula Portis	2 episodes
2021	Goliath	Miss Kathy	Episode: "Spilt Milk"
2022	Real Husbands of Hollywood	Dr. Moreau	3 episodes
2022	9-1-1: Lone Star	Wren	Episode: "The ATX-Files"
2022	Grey's Anatomy	Jane Collins	Episode: "Everything Has Changed"
2022–2023	1923	Sister Alice	4 episodes
2024	SEAL Team	Samantha Miles	4 episodes
2024	High Potential	Mrs. Davis	Episode: "Croaked"
2024–present	A Man on the Inside	Megan Chagughlaight-Accourse	10 episodes
2025	Watson	Dr. Amelia Woodward	Episode: "Back from the Dead"

=== Stage ===
Year	Title	Role	Venue	Notes
1993	Cyrano	Ensemble	Neil Simon Theatre	
1995	Translations	Sarah, Bridget	Plymouth Theater	
1997	How I Learned to Drive	Teenage Greek Chorus	Vineyard Theatre	
1999	Annie Get Your Gun	Dolly Tate	Marquis Theatre	Replacement
1999	Bright Lights, Big City	Pinkie/Megan	New York Theatre Workshop	
2001	Little Women	Jo March	Duke University	Workshop
2002	Into the Woods	Baker's Wife	Broadhurst Theatre	
2003	Dublin Carol	Mary	Linda Gross Theater	
2005	Flight	Anne Morrow Lindbergh	Lucille Lortel Theatre	
2008	White Christmas	Betty Haynes	Marquis Theatre	
2009	Billy Elliot the Musical	Dead Mum	Imperial Theatre	Replacement
2011	On a Clear Day You Can See Forever	Dr. Sharone Stein	St. James Theatre	
