= Those Who Kill (American TV series) =

- Genre: Crime drama
- Based on: Den som dræber by Elsebeth Egholm; Stefan Jaworski
- Developed by: Glen Morgan
- Starring: Chloë Sevigny; James D'Arcy; James Morrison; Bruce Davison; Omid Abtahi; Kerry O'Malley
- Theme music composer: Johnny Jewel; Nat Walker
- Opening theme: "The Hunt" by Symmetry
- Country of origin: United States
- Original language: English
- No. of seasons: 1
- No. of episodes: 10

Production
- Executive producers: Brian Grazer; Glen Morgan; David Petrarca; Francie Calfo; Peter Bose; Jonas Allen
- Producers: Kelly A. Manners; Howard Griffith
- Cinematography: Yasu Tanida
- Editors: James Coblentz; Matthew Colonna; Louis Cioffi; Jason Hellmann
- Camera setup: Single-camera
- Running time: 42 minutes
- Production companies: One Two One Three Pictures; Miso Film; Imagine Television; Fox 21

Original release
- Network: A&E
- Release: March 3 – March 10, 2014
- Network: Lifetime Movie Network
- Release: March 30 – May 18, 2014

Those Who Kill (stylized as "those who KILL") is an American crime drama television series developed by Glen Morgan. The series originally premiered on the cable television network A&E on March 3, 2014, and was re-launched on its sister network, the Lifetime Movie Network, on March 30. It is based on the Danish television series Den som dræber. The show was shot on location in Pittsburgh, Pennsylvania. On May 18, 2014, Morgan announced the show had been cancelled after only ten episodes.

== Plot ==
Catherine Jensen, a recently promoted homicide detective, enlists the help of Thomas Schaeffer, a forensic psychologist, to track down serial killers and relentlessly seeks the truth behind the disappearance of her brother that she thinks is linked to his stepfather, Judge Howard Burgess.

== Cast ==
=== Main cast ===
- Chloë Sevigny as Detective Catherine Jensen
- James D'Arcy as Dr. Thomas Schaeffer
- James Morrison as Commander Frank Bisgaard
- Bruce Davison as Judge Howard Burgess
- Omid Abtahi as Detective Jerry Molbeck
- Kerry O'Malley as Medical Examiner Mia Vogel

=== Recurring cast ===
- Anne Dudek as Benedicte Schaeffer
- Michael Rispoli as Detective Don Wilkie
- Dino Rende as John Schaeffer
- Kathy Baker as Marie Burgess
- Kyle Bornheimer as Paul Cavallo
- Desmond Harrington as Detective Nico Bronte
- Michael Weston as The Space Cowboy
- Vinessa Shaw as Angela Early
- Michelle Veintimilla as Sarah Branson

== Production ==
In January 2012, the A&E television channel announced that it had bought the rights to develop a U.S. version of the Danish series, Those Who Kill. A pilot episode began filming in Pittsburgh in December 2012, produced by Fox 21 and written by Glen Morgan, with Chloë Sevigny starring as Pittsburgh Police homicide detective Catherine Jensen, and James D'Arcy as forensic psychologist Thomas Schaeffer.

In April 2013, A&E announced that it had greenlit a 10-episode first season of the series, which would begin production in Pittsburgh in late 2013. Drawn to the region due to state tax credits, filming lasted from September to December 2013. Producers selected locations such as warehouses, parking garages, pubs, hospitals, theaters, penitentiaries, the Allegheny County Courthouse, Riverview Park, the Carnegie Free Library of Allegheny, and the abandoned Carrie Furnace to capture the mood of the series.

== Reception ==
Those Who Kill received mixed reviews. It received 54/100 score from 22 reviews at Metacritic. Review aggregator Rotten Tomatoes reports that seven out of 24 critics gave the series a "rotten" rating. The site's consensus is, "In spite of its suspenseful premise and an effective performance by Chloë Sevigny, Those Who Kill is bogged down by monotonous plots and senseless violence." The series debuted on March 3, 2014, with 1.4 million total viewers, and drew 830,000 viewers for its second episode. A&E then pulled the drama from its schedule, with plans to relaunch it in a new time slot. Instead, the series was shifted to A&E's sister network, the Lifetime Movie Network, for a re-launch.

== Episodes ==
No.	Title	Directed by	Written by	Original release date	Prod. code	U.S. viewers (millions)
1	"Pilot"	Joe Carnahan	Glen Morgan	March 3, 2014	1WAL79	1.44
Pittsburgh's newest homicide detective Catherine Jensen is haunted by the disappearance of her brother years ago, and her parents have lost interest in finding him. However, Jensen must focus on her new job when a mummified corpse is found at a demolition site. She knows it is more than just an accident or random murder. She enlists the help of academic forensic psychologist Thomas Schaeffer, who suggests a serial killer roams the city. When Catherine gets kidnapped by the killer, Schaeffer must think like him in order to solve the case and save her.
2	"The Way Home"	David Petrarca	Glen Morgan	March 10, 2014	1WAL01	0.83
Molbeck investigates the murder of a woman found bludgeoned in a dumpster, while Catherine waits for the D.A.'s decision about her actions with the previous case. Meanwhile, Schaeffer gives his statement to the D.A., then resumes investigating Judge Howard Burgess, Catherine's stepfather.
3	"Rocking the Boat"	Phil Abraham	Chris Levinson	March 30, 2014	1WAL02	0.34
While the team continues to investigate the bludgeoning death at the dumpster and the suicide of a suspect, Catherine and Schaeffer must ask Judge Burgess to look at the suspect's sealed documents for clues. They travel to a rural farm where several adopted children, including the suicidal suspect, were raised. Meanwhile, the killer strikes again, killing a woman who had been questioned by the police.
4	"Sunday"	Charlotte Sieling	Glen Morgan	April 6, 2014	1WAL03	0.63
Angela Early, a nurse at an assisted living home, is revealed to be the killer. A suspect in custody states that the victim found underneath the bridge was her son and approached her that night. The team learns Early was raped as a teenager and her parents forced her to keep the baby. Catherine asks Judge Burgess for help, and he points her to the nursing home. Early commits suicide to prevent being taken into custody.
5	"Souvenirs"	David Petrarca	Darin Morgan & Glen Morgan	April 13, 2014	1WAL04	0.72
When Thomas decides to stop working on active cases, Catherine starts investigating his past, which leads her to an unexpected family history. Catherine takes Thomas to the basement of her step-father's house where her brother was sexually abused. Thomas tells Catherine he believes that her mother has always known about the abuse.
6	"Always After"	Stefan Schwartz	Jeff Eckerle & Marilyn Osborn	April 20, 2014	1WAL05	0.59
Thomas's suggestion to Catherine about her mother deeply disturbs her. Meanwhile, the team investigates a possible domestic homicide where a mother and her children are killed. They later find the father dead from a gunshot wound, but his time of death occurred before his family's. Thomas suspects the killer hid in the house's crawlspace, and his re-enactment affects his own family, as the killer targets another one.
7	"A Safe Place"	Sam Miller	Jeff Eckerle & Marilyn Osborn	April 27, 2014	1WAL06	0.80
After the discovery of aluminum residue on a recent victim, Catherine scans crime scene photos to see a neighboring house under construction. The foreman gives them the name of a man recently fired for looking at the neighbors. The team visits his house to find his family dead and a home video they presume he watched after killing them. They learn the general area of his current target and are able to find the exact house. Inside, the killer has cut the mother, but she opens the door for Catherine and they switch places. Catherine assumes the wife and mother role, cooks breakfast, and gets the killer to sit in front of the window at the kitchen table. He is killed by a police sniper. The situation affects both Thomas and Catherine. He promises his family to never let a case take precedence over them, and Catherine messages her mother to talk about Howard.
8	"Insomnia"	John Coles	Andrew Wilder	May 4, 2014	1WAL07	0.47
A killer uses enhanced hallucinogens in his methods, causing the team to work with the Narcotics Division and Catherine's former lover. Meanwhile, Thomas must revisit a case on which he based his book, as he receives post cards from the killer. Also, Catherine's mother is hospitalized after apparently having a stroke and falling down the stairs at home. Her condition worsens, and her family must make a difficult decision.
9	"Untethered"	Stephen Kay	Andrew Wilder	May 11, 2014	1WAL08	0.75
The team investigates the connection the killer has with his drug dealing, as he targets his next couple. Meanwhile, Thomas becomes paranoid trying to think like him. At her mother's funeral reception, Catherine is introduced to a boy being mentored by Howard. Suspicious, she is torn between investigating him and the murder case. This causes her to abandon Molbeck on surveillance and he is shot by the killer.
10	"Surrender"	David Petrarca	Chris Levinson	May 18, 2014	1WAL09	0.49
With Molbeck in the hospital, the police have stepped up their methods to catch the killer. Believing the killer will not change his dumpsites, they make all city park entrances checkpoints. His vehicle passes inspection, as he has already disposed of a body. Knowing he can no longer use the vehicle, he allows his current captive victims to escape in it, only after he rigged it to explode. The FBI takes over the case, but Thomas and Catherine set a trap for the killer by publishing he is a copycat killer. They deliver him to Bisgaard. Meanwhile, Thomas tells Catherine to order the 9-1-1 call Howard placed when her mother fell down the stairs. When she listens to the call, she hears Howard speak to a boy in the house. Catherine believes her mother was killed when she discovered Howard raping the boy. Armed, she enters Howard's house, with Thomas pursuing her, while Howard waits inside with a gun. The sound of one shot fired is heard in the closing scene.
