= Sue Costello =

American actress

- Born: April 2, 1968 (age 58); Dorchester, Boston, Massachusetts, U.S.
- Occupations: Actress, comedian, writer, producer

Sue Costello (born April 2, 1968) is an actress, comedian, writer and producer from the Savin Hill area in the Dorchester neighborhood of Boston, Massachusetts.

Costello starred in the self-titled television series Costello on Fox, where she was also a producer and the co-creator of the show.

Costello has also appeared on television shows such as NYPD Blue, Tough Crowd with Colin Quinn on Comedy Central, and Comics Unleashed. She was a guest host on NBC's Later, and has also performed on Comedy Central's "Premium Blend".

Costello has appeared in the films Southie, Once in the Life and The Fighter.

Costello appeared in NBC's Last Comic Standing in 2004, making it to the finals, and can be heard on Episodes 172 and 936 of Marc Maron's podcast, WTF.

Costello wrote and stars in her one-woman show, "Minus 32 Million Words" and launched her podcast, "The Kadoozie Kast with Sue Costello" in December 2012.

In Watts, California, there is an official Sue Costello day on September 29.

Costello was a frequent guest on the Jay Thomas Show, a radio show on SiriusXM Comedy Greats.

== Legal matters ==
In April 2023, Costello filed a pro se lawsuit against Paramount Global, Inc. (formerly ViacomCBS) in the U.S. District Court for the Southern District of New York (Case No. 1:23-cv-01553), alleging fraudulent inducement, IP theft, RICO violations, and suppression related to a 2018 TV development deal. The suit claims CBS executives stole her comedy script idea during a pitch meeting, induced a fraudulent contract via misrepresentations, and used arbitration clauses and internal investigations to bury the claims amid the 2018 Les Moonves #MeToo scandals, which she alleges were a smokescreen for merger fraud. The case also invokes the Ending Forced Arbitration of Sexual Assault Act (EFAA, 9 U.S.C. § 402) to override arbitration, citing ongoing coercion as "continuing harassment."

U.S. District Judge Lorna G. Schofield dismissed the case with prejudice on August 18, 2024, for failure to arbitrate, adopting U.S. Magistrate Judge Valerie Figueredo's recommendation. Costello appealed to the Second Circuit (No. 25-794) on April 10, 2025. The appeal alleges judicial bias (recusal motion filed September 22, 2025, forwarded to panel September 28) and ties the case to broader CBS/Paramount shareholder suits over merger disclosures. As of October 2025, the appeal remains pending, with Costello actively posting updates on X (formerly Twitter).
