= Costello (TV series) =

1998 American television sitcom

- Genre: Sitcom
- Created by: Sue Costello; Cheryl Holliday
- Starring: Sue Costello; Jenny O'Hara; Dan Lauria; Kerry O'Malley; Chuck Walczak; Timothy Pickering
- Composer: Dan Foliart
- Country of origin: United States
- Original language: English
- No. of seasons: 1
- No. of episodes: 8 (4 unaired)

Production
- Producer: Gayle S. Maffeo
- Camera setup: Multi-camera
- Running time: approx. 22 minutes
- Production companies: Wind Dancer Productions; Touchstone Television

Original release
- Network: Fox
- Release: September 15 – October 13, 1998

Costello is an American television sitcom created by Sue Costello and Cheryl Holliday which aired on Fox from September 15 to October 13, 1998.

== Premise ==
The series was about an Irish-American family in South Boston. The central character is Sue Murphy (Sue Costello), a barmaid who has broken up with her boyfriend and is trying to improve herself, despite the incomprehension of her blue-collar family.

== Cast ==
- Sue Costello as Sue Murphy
- Jenny O'Hara as Lottie Murphy
- Dan Lauria as Spud Murphy
- Kerry O'Malley as Trish Donnelly
- Chuck Walczak as Jimmy Murphy
- Timothy Pickering as Fingers

== Critical response ==
The show wasn't popular with critics, who considered it vulgar and shouty. A review in The New York Times said, "There are entirely too many colorfully crude blue-collar characters". The Los Angeles Times called it a more working-class Cheers and criticized Costello's acting ability.

== Episodes ==
| No. | Title | Directed by | Written by | Original release date |
|---|---|---|---|---|
| 1 | "Pilot" | John Whitesell | Story by : Cheryl Holliday & Sue Costello; Teleplay by : Cheryl Holliday | September 15, 1998 |
Sue breaks up with her boyfriend and moves back in with her parents.
| 2 | "Monkey Butt" | Lee Shallat Chemel | Gabe Sachs & Jeff Judah | September 22, 1998 |
Sue writes an essay for her college application. Lottie exposes her red panties in church and gets the nickname "monkey butt".
| 3 | "Sue Drives, Ya Suck Bag" | Lee Shallat Chemel | Cheryl Holliday | October 6, 1998 |
Sue asks her family for help with getting her drivers license.
| 4 | "Sue Dates a Freakin' Dentist" | Ted Wass | Lester Lewis | October 13, 1998 |
Sue has a crush on her dentist.
| 5 | "The Anniversary" | N/A | Alex Herschlag | Unaired |
Jimmy steals cable TV as a present for his parents wedding anniversary.
| 6 | "The Garage" | Lee Shallat Chemel | Bob Daily | Unaired |
Sue moves into the garage.
| 7 | "Double Date" | N/A | Mary Fitzgerald | Unaired |
Sue and Trish feel sad about their love lives.
| 8 | "Angie O'Plasty" | N/A | Jane O'Brien | Unaired |
Lottie has a heart attack on Halloween.
