= Mike O'Malley =

American actor, writer and producer (born 1966)

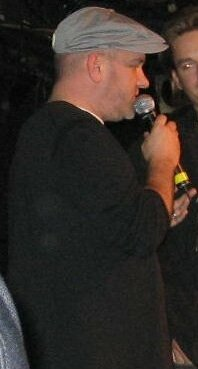
- Born: Michael Edward O'Malley; October 31, 1966 (age 60); Boston, Massachusetts, U.S.
- Education: University of New Hampshire
- Occupations: Actor; writer; producer
- Years active: 1991–present
- Children: 3

Michael Edward O'Malley (born October 31, 1966) is an American actor, writer and television producer. Born in Boston and raised in New Hampshire, O'Malley hosted the early 1990s children's game shows Get the Picture and Nickelodeon Guts before moving to Los Angeles later that decade to star in his own sitcom for NBC called The Mike O'Malley Show. He is best known for his role as Jimmy Hughes on Yes, Dear, a CBS series which aired from 2000 to 2006. He was nominated for an Emmy Award for his role as Burt Hummel on the Fox series Glee.

O'Malley has also guest-starred in series including My Name Is Earl, Raising Hope, Parenthood, and Parks and Recreation, and has appeared in films including 28 Days; Deep Impact; Leatherheads; Eat, Pray, Love; R.I.P.D.; Concussion; and Sully.

O'Malley is also a published playwright whose plays include Three Years From Thirty and Diverting Devotion. He adapted another play called Searching for Certainty for Peter Askin's film Certainty, which premiered at the Boston Film Festival in 2011. O'Malley was also a writer on Showtime's comedy-drama Shameless.

O'Malley was the creator and an executive producer of the Starz series Survivor's Remorse, which ran for four seasons between 2014 and 2017. He has recently been a regular on the TNT series Snowpiercer, based on the film of the same name.

== Early life ==
O'Malley was born in Boston, Massachusetts, and raised in Nashua, New Hampshire. His mother Marianne was a career counselor and father Tony O'Malley an executive in the defense industry.

O'Malley graduated from Bishop Guertin High School in Nashua, New Hampshire in 1984, and from the University of New Hampshire in 1988, where he studied theater. He is also a member of Kappa Sigma fraternity.

== Career ==
=== Television ===
O'Malley's first career breakthrough came as the host of Nickelodeon children's game show Get the Picture in 1991. A year later, in 1992, he was the host of Nickelodeon Guts and later Global GUTS from 1992 to 1995. On the advice of Marc Summers, O'Malley moved to Los Angeles after the conclusion of GUTS to further pursue his acting career. O'Malley starred in Life with Roger, a series which aired from 1996 to 1997. In 1999, two of thirteen filmed episodes of The Mike O'Malley Show aired before the show was canceled. During the 1990s, he also appeared as "The Rick", a character in a series of ads for the ESPN network. In 2018, The Rick made a return in ads for the ESPN+ streaming service.

From 2000 to 2006, O'Malley starred as Jimmy Hughes on the CBS comedy Yes, Dear. He later reprised this role in 2013 on the sitcom Raising Hope. Along with Yes, Dear costar Anthony Clark, O'Malley appeared in the Alan Jackson music video "The Talkin' Song Repair Blues". From 2000 to 2002, O'Malley also provided the voice of Darryl MacPherson for The WB's Baby Blues.

In 2006, O'Malley made a guest appearance on My Name Is Earl as a police officer with bowling aspirations, and made several more guest appearances on the show. In 2008, O'Malley appeared in the NBC drama My Own Worst Enemy.

In 2008, O'Malley became the spokesman for Time Warner Cable's digital cable. In 2009, O'Malley began playing the recurring character, Burt Hummel, the father of a student, on Glee. The role lead to Entertainment Weekly's Tim Stack to say, "If Mike O'Malley doesn't win an Emmy for playing Burt Hummel, I will be sorely disappointed." Chris Colfer, who plays Burt's son Kurt, has credited his off-screen relationship with O'Malley with improving the quality of their scenes together.

Beginning in 2010, O'Malley portrayed a recurring character on Parenthood. He also hosted The World's Funniest Office Commercials in 2010. On July 8, 2010, O'Malley received a nomination for the Primetime Emmy Award for Outstanding Guest Actor – Comedy Series for playing Burt Hummel on Glee. Prior to its second season, O'Malley was made a series regular on Glee. On August 8, 2010, O'Malley won the Teen Choice Award for Best Parental Unit. He returned to recurring guest star status for the show's third season.

=== Film ===
O'Malley made his film debut in the 1998 film Deep Impact, playing Elijah Wood's astronomy teacher. He followed that with a supporting role in the comedy Pushing Tin. In 2000, he portrayed Oliver, a drug addict in rehab, in the film 28 Days. In 2005, O'Malley appeared in the film The Perfect Man. In 2007, he had supporting roles in Leatherheads and Meet Dave.

O'Malley was interviewed in the film City of Champions: The Best of Boston Sports.

In 2009, O'Malley participated in the American documentary film The People Speak. In the film, he performed in a segment with political activist Staceyann Chin.

O'Malley's feature work also includes roles in Eat Pray Love, Cedar Rapids, Concussion and Sully.

=== Writing and producing ===
O'Malley is a playwright with two of his plays, Three Years from Thirty and Diverting Devotion, having been published and produced Off-Broadway. In 2003, a third play, Searching for Certainty was produced in Los Angeles.

He served as the director for the series finale episode of Yes, Dear, in which he starred.

He later wrote the screenplay for the film Certainty, which is based on Searching for Certainty. The film began production on May 24, 2010, directed by Peter Askin and produced by O'Malley, along with Will Battersby and Per Melita. Certainty premiered at the Boston Film Festival on September 16, 2011, where it won the Best Screenplay, Best Editing, and Best Ensemble Cast awards.

He was also a writer and consulting producer on the Showtime comedy-drama series Shameless.

O'Malley co-wrote the book for the musical Escape to Margaritaville featuring the songs of Jimmy Buffett with Greg Garcia. The show ran on Broadway from February to July 2018.

He created the Starz basketball comedy series Survivor's Remorse and serves as the show's writer and producer with his production company O'Malley Ink. He is also an executive producer as well as the showrunner for the series Heels, with a recurring role as Charlie Gully, a rival wrestling promoter.

=== Other media work ===
Along with Anthony Clark, his Yes, Dear co-star, he appeared in Alan Jackson's 2005 music video for "The Talkin' Song Repair Blues".

In 2007, O'Malley kept a blog on Yahoo! Sports, which followed the Boston Red Sox throughout their journey in the MLB playoffs, which was eventually capped off by their World Series title.

== Personal life ==
O'Malley resides in Los Angeles with his wife Lisa, who is a school psychologist. They have three children.

Kerry O'Malley, his younger sister, is an actress and Broadway veteran. The siblings co-starred in the first season of Snowpiercer.

A longtime fan of Boston band Buffalo Tom, O'Malley is a close friend of lead singer Bill Janovitz. They have often supported causes together. O'Malley requested that the band create a title song for his own series The Mike O'Malley Show, as well as for the sitcom Yes, Dear which he co-starred on. According to O'Malley, his love of the band was shared with his wife and was "the glue" that kept them together during their long-distance relationship.

O'Malley is a Boston Red Sox fan, and in May 2006, threw out the first pitch at a game in Fenway Park. He is also an avid fan of the NHL's Boston Bruins and the NFL's New England Patriots.

O'Malley returned to his alma mater in 2006 to deliver the commencement speech to the university's 136th graduating class. He also received an honorary Doctor of Performing Arts degree.

== Acting credits ==
=== Film ===
Year	Title	Role
1998	Some Girl	Dan
1998	Deep Impact	Mike Perry
1998	Above Freezing	Artie
1999	Pushing Tin	Pete
2000	28 Days	Oliver
2005	The Perfect Man	Lenny Horton
2005	City of Champions: The Best of Boston Sports	Himself
2007	On Broadway	Father Rolie O'Toole
2008	Meet Dave	Officer Knox
2008	Leatherheads	Mickey
2009	The People Speak	Himself
2010	Eat Pray Love	Andy Shiraz
2011	Cedar Rapids	Mike Pyle
2012	So Undercover	Sam Morris
2013	3 Geezers!	Mike
2013	R.I.P.D.	Elliot
2014	A Good Marriage	Bill Gaines
2015	Concussion	Daniel Sullivan
2016	Sully	Charles Porter
2019	3 Days with Dad	Brick Deever
2025	Eenie Meanie	George
2025	After All	Barry

=== Television ===
Year	Title	Role	Notes
1991	Law & Order	New York Policeman #1	Episode: "The Torrents of Greed: Part 2"
1991	Get the Picture	Host	
1992–1995	Nickelodeon Guts	Host	Show renamed as Global Guts in 1995
1996–1997	Life with Roger	Roger Hoyt	20 episodes
1997	Path to Paradise: The Untold Story of the World Trade Center Bombing	Storage facility manager	Television film
1997–1998	Figure It Out	Panelist	Unknown episodes
1999	The Mike O'Malley Show	Mike	14 episodes
2000–2002	Baby Blues	Darryl MacPherson	Voice, 13 episodes
2000–2006	Yes, Dear	Jimmy Hughes	122 episodes
2006–2009	My Name Is Earl	Stuart	13 episodes
2008	My Own Worst Enemy	Tom Grady/Raymond Carter	9 episodes
2008	Pretty/Handsome	Chip Fromme	Television film
2009–2011	Glenn Martin, DDS	Various	Voice, 3 episodes
2009–2015	Glee	Burt Hummel	Main role (season 2); Recurring role (seasons 1, 3–6); 33 episodes Teen Choice Award for Choice TV Parental Unit; Nominated—Primetime Emmy Award for Outstanding Guest Actor in a Comedy Series; Nominated—Screen Actors Guild Award for Outstanding Performance by an Ensemble in a Comedy Series (2011–12)
2010	Parenthood	Jim Kazinsky	3 episodes
2011	Family Album	Dave Bronsky	Unsold TV pilot
2011	The Mighty B!	Cop #1	Voice, episode: "YIPs"
2012	Parks and Recreation	Bill	Episode: "Bus Tour"
2013	Justified	Nick "Nicky" Augustine	6 episodes
2013	Axe Cop	Ray	Voice, episode: "Taxi Cop"
2013	Behind the Candelabra	Tracy Schnelker	Television film
2013	Welcome to the Family	Dr. Dan Yoder	11 episodes
2013–2014	Raising Hope	Jimmy Hughes	2 episodes, Reprised his role from Yes, Dear
2014	BoJack Horseman	Artie	Voice, episode: "Live Fast, Diane Nguyen"
2016	Sanjay and Craig	Himself	Voice, episode: "G.U.T.S. Busters"
2016	Survivor's Remorse	Figgy	Episode: "Second Thoughts"
2018–2020	The Good Place	The Doorman	4 episodes
2019	Wayne	Principal Cole	5 episodes
2019	Get Shorty	Detective Aaron Mischka	2 episodes
2019	The Morning Show	Tim Eavers	Episode: "The Pendulum Swings"
2020–2024	Snowpiercer	Sam Roche	Main role
2021–2023	Heels	Charlie Gully	Recurring role
2023–2026	Abbott Elementary	Captain Robinson	7 episodes
2023	Grand Crew	Zeb Jenkins	Episode: "Wine & Honors"
2025	Doctor Odyssey	Dr. Rodney Prescott	Episode: "Crew Week"
2025	Suits LA	Avery Jeffers	Episode: "Freedom"
2026	Nemesis	Detective Rick Viggiano	5 episodes
2026	Fire Country	Danny Marks	3 episodes
2026	NCIS	Walt Keller	Episode: "Sleeping Dogs"

== Writing and producing credits ==
=== Film ===
Year	Title	Writer	Producer	Notes
2011	Certainty	Yes	Yes	

=== Television ===
Year	Title	Network	Creator	Writer	Executive Producer	Notes
1999	The Mike O'Malley Show	NBC	Yes	Yes	Yes	
2012	Prodigy Bully	NBC	Yes	Yes	Yes	Unsold TV pilot
2011–13	Shameless	Showtime	No	Yes	No	5 episodes
2014–17	Survivor's Remorse	Starz	Yes	Yes	Yes	36 episodes
2021–23	Heels	Starz	No	Yes	Yes	3 episodes
2023–24	Extended Family	NBC	Yes	Yes	Yes	2 episodes

=== Theatre ===
- Three Years from Thirty (1994)
- Diverting Devotion (1996)
- Searching for Certainty (2003)
- Escape to Margaritaville (2017)
