= Certainty (film) =

2011 American drama film

- Film poster
- Directed by: Peter Askin
- Written by: Mike O'Malley
- Based on: Searching for Certainty by Mike O'Malley
- Produced by: Will Battersby; Per Melita; Mike O'Malley
- Starring: Tom Lipinski; Adelaide Clemens; Kristen Connolly; Will Rogers; Valerie Harper; Bobby Moynihan; Giancarlo Esposito
- Cinematography: Sean Kirby
- Edited by: Karen Lynn Weinberg
- Music by: David Mansfield
- Distributed by: FilmBuff
- Release dates: September 16, 2011 (Boston Film Festival); November 30, 2012 (United States)
- Country: United States
- Language: English

Certainty is a 2011 American drama film directed by Peter Askin and written by Mike O'Malley, based on his stage play Searching for Certainty. The cast includes newcomers Tom Lipinski, Adelaide Clemens, Kristen Connolly and Will Rogers alongside veterans Valerie Harper, Bobby Moynihan and Giancarlo Esposito. The film was produced by Will Battersby, Per Melita and O'Malley.

== Synopsis ==
Certainty tells the story of Dom and Deb who are attending their Pre-Cana engagement encounter weekend, the process a couple must go through in order to get married in the Catholic church.

== Production ==
Filming began on May 24, 2010, in New York City.

== Release ==
Certainty premiered on September 16, 2011, at the Boston Film Festival, where it won awards for Best Screenplay, Best Editing, and Best Ensemble Cast. It was also shown at the Sarasota Film Festival and the Nantucket Film Festival, as well as festivals in New Hampshire and Long Beach.

It was released theatrically and digitally at the end of November 2012 by FilmBuff.
