= On Broadway (film) =

- Promotional poster
- Directed by: Dave McLaughlin
- Screenplay by: Dave McLaughlin
- Story by: Dave McLaughlin
- Produced by: Charlie Harrington; Donna Bertolon; Lance Greene; Kris Meyer
- Starring: Joey McIntyre; Eliza Dushku; Mike O'Malley; Sean Lawlor; Will Arnett; Amy Poehler; Lance Greene; Robert Wahlberg
- Cinematography: Terrence Hayes
- Edited by: Julie Garces
- Release dates: April 25, 2007 (Boston Independent Film Festival); March 14, 2008 (United States)
- Running time: 98 minutes
- Country: United States
- Language: English
- Box office: $23,968

On Broadway is an independent film, shot in Boston in May 2006, starring Joey McIntyre, Jill Flint, Eliza Dushku, Mike O'Malley, Robert Wahlberg, Amy Poehler and Will Arnett.

== Plot ==
Emotionally devastated by the death of his uncle, Boston carpenter Jack O'Toole (McIntyre) writes a play inspired by the man's wake. When nobody will produce the play, Jack quits his job to produce it himself, imagining that this play will give a new start to the strained relationship Jack has with his father. But the only stage Jack can afford is in the back room of a neighborhood pub. In this humble environment, Jack pulls together a theater company of sorts and brings his story to the stage, and in the process he brings together his family and friends and helps them move beyond their loss.

== Cast ==
- Joey McIntyre as Jack O'Toole, a carpenter turned playwright
- Eliza Dushku as Lena Wilson, the lead actress in Jack's play
- Mike O'Malley as Father Rolie O'Toole, Jack's priest brother
- Sean Lawlor as Martin O'Toole, Jack's estranged father
- Will Arnett as Tom, the actor and Jack's friend
- Amy Poehler as Farrah, Tom's wife
- Lance Greene as Billy O'Toole, Pete's son and Jack's cousin
- Robert Wahlberg as Kevin Sheehan, Jack's cousin
- Vincent Dowling as Augie Burke, a friend of the O'Tooles
- Lucas Caleb Rooney as Neil Quinn, Jack's friend
- Jill Flint as Kate O'Toole, Jack's wife
- Andrew Connolly as Pete O'Toole, Jack's late uncle

== Credits ==
The film was written and directed by playwright/screenwriter Dave McLaughlin and shot by cinematographer Terrence Fitzgerald Hayes. The film was produced by Charlie Harrington.

Additional cast members included Vincent Dowling, Sean Lawlor, Lucas Caleb Rooney, Lance Greene, Andrew Connolly, Peter Giles, Dossy Peabody, Will Harris and Nancy E. Carroll.

== Release ==
On Broadway had its festival release at a sold-out premiere at the Independent Film Festival of Boston on April 27, 2007. It received good reviews. The film went on to screen at the film festivals of Woods Hole, Galway, New Hampshire, Hoboken, New Jersey, Waterfront, Napa and Northampton. It won an award for Best Feature in the Galway Film Fleadh, another for Audience Best Feature in the Woods Hole Film Festival, the Grand Jury Prize for Best Film in the New Hampshire Film Festival and had six nominations in the Hoboken Film Festival. At the 2007 Phoenix Film Festival On Broadway won the Sundance Channel Audience Award for Best Film, and Joey McIntyre won the Best Breakthrough Performance Award at the same festival.

On Broadway had a theatrical release on March 14, 2008 in Boston at the Somerville Theater, West Newton Cinema, Sharon Cinemas 8 and Dedham Community Theater.
