= Dave McLaughlin =

American writer, director and producer

David McLaughlin is an American writer, director and producer best known for co-writing the 1998 dramatic film Southie. In 2006 he directed, wrote and produced the independent feature On Broadway. It was based on his upbringing in a neighborhood of Boston and drew from his past experience as a playwright.

McLaughlin is a graduate of Boston College.

== Filmography ==
Year	Film	Position
1998	Southie	Writer
2006	On Broadway	Writer, Director, Producer
