= James Joyce Tower and Museum =

Martello tower in Sandycove, Ireland

- Túr agus Músaem Shéamuis Seoige
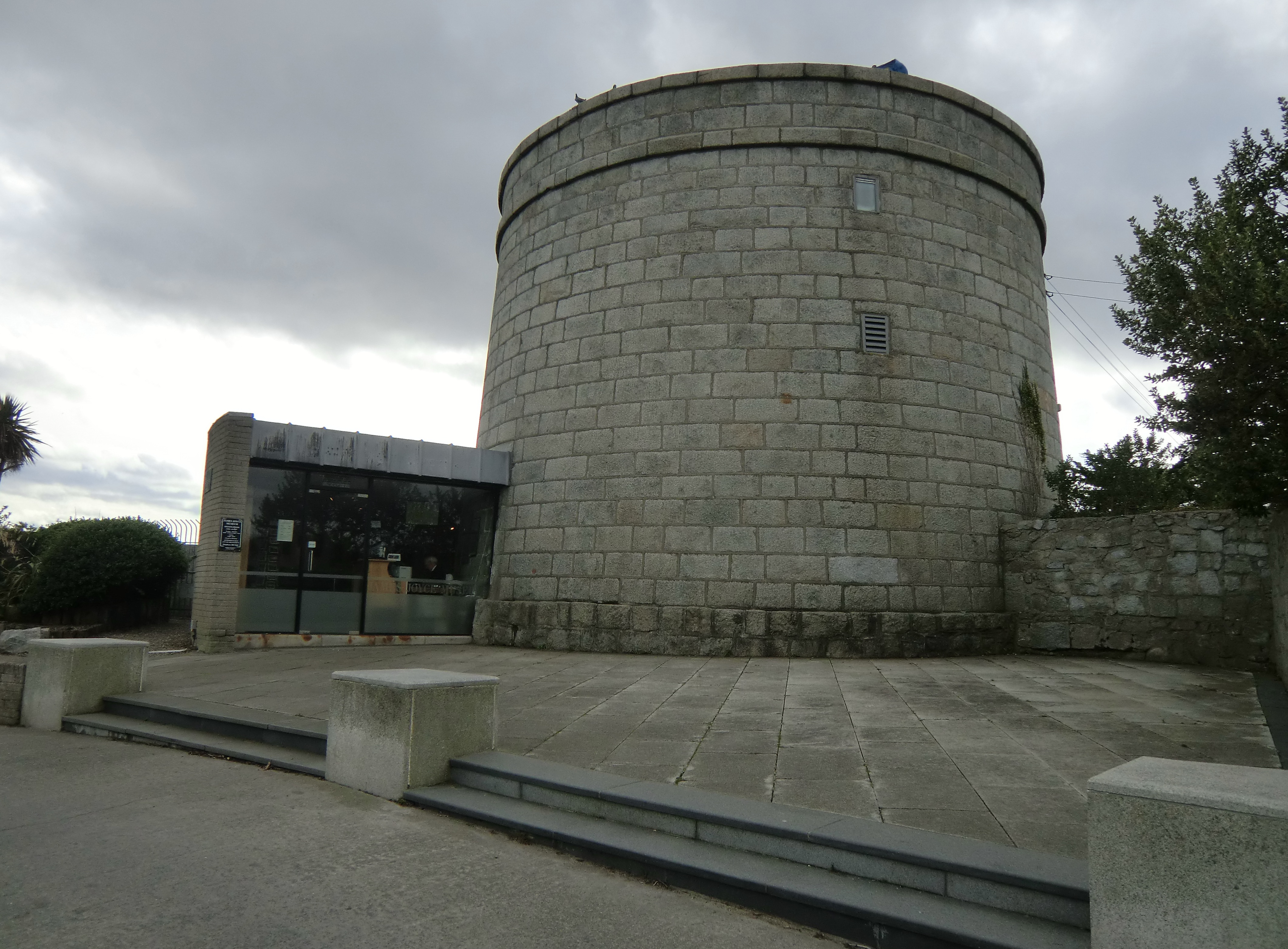

- Location within Dublin
- Established: 16 June 1962
- Location: Sandycove Point, Sandycove, Dublin, Ireland
- Coordinates: 53°17′19″N 6°06′49″W
- Type: Martello tower, literary museum
- Public transit access: Sandycove Road bus stop (Dublin Bus 59, 111); Sandycove and Glasthule railway station
- Website: joycetower.ie

The James Joyce Tower and Museum is a Martello tower in Sandycove, Dublin, where James Joyce spent six nights in 1904. The opening scenes of his 1922 novel Ulysses take place here, and the tower is a place of pilgrimage for Joyce enthusiasts, especially on Bloomsday. Admission is free.

== History ==
The tower was leased from the War Office by Joyce's university friend Oliver St. John Gogarty, with the purpose of "Hellenising" Ireland. Joyce stayed there for six days, from 9 to 14 September in 1904. Gogarty later attributed Joyce's abrupt departure to an incident in which a roommate brandished a loaded revolver after being startled by a nightmare.

The opening scenes of Ulysses are set the morning after a fictionalised version of this incident. Gogarty is immortalised as "Stately, plump Buck Mulligan" (the opening words of the novel).

The tower now contains a museum dedicated to Joyce and displays some of his possessions and other ephemera associated with Ulysses (e.g., "Plumtree's Potted Meat" pot). The living space is set up to resemble its 1904 appearance, and contains a ceramic panther to represent one seen in a nightmare by Haines which is referenced in the opening chapter of the book.

It was purchased in 1954 by architect Michael Scott who had built his house, Geragh next door in 1937 on a former quarry. In 1962, he donated the tower for the purpose of making it a museum. Michael Scott is co-founder, with financial assistance by John Huston, of the James Joyce Museum at the Joyce Tower.

The Tower became a museum opening on 16 June 1962 through the efforts of Dublin artist John Ryan. Ryan also rescued the front door to 7 Eccles Street (now at the James Joyce Centre) from demolition and organised, with Brian O'Nolan, the first Bloomsday Celebration in 1954.

The James Joyce Tower is open Thursday–Sunday, 10am–4pm Admission is free, though visits can be booked in advance on the website for a small donation. The museum is run by the Friends of Joyce Tower Society on a voluntary basis.

Joyce Tower

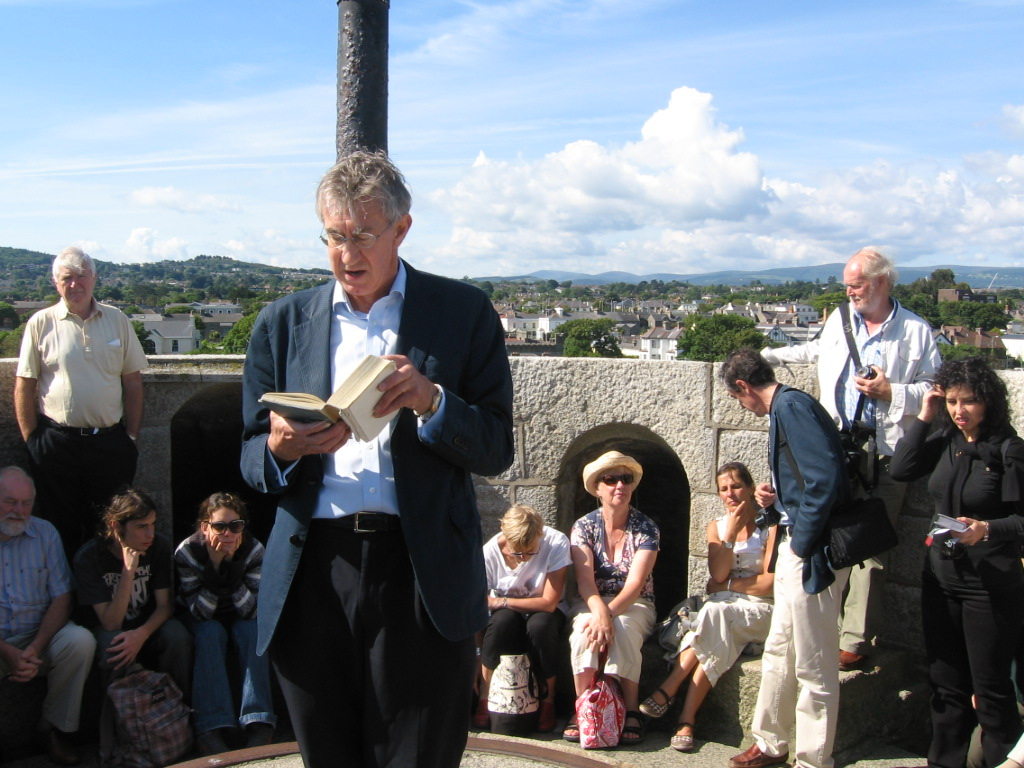
Barry McGovern reads Ulysses, Bloomsday, 2009

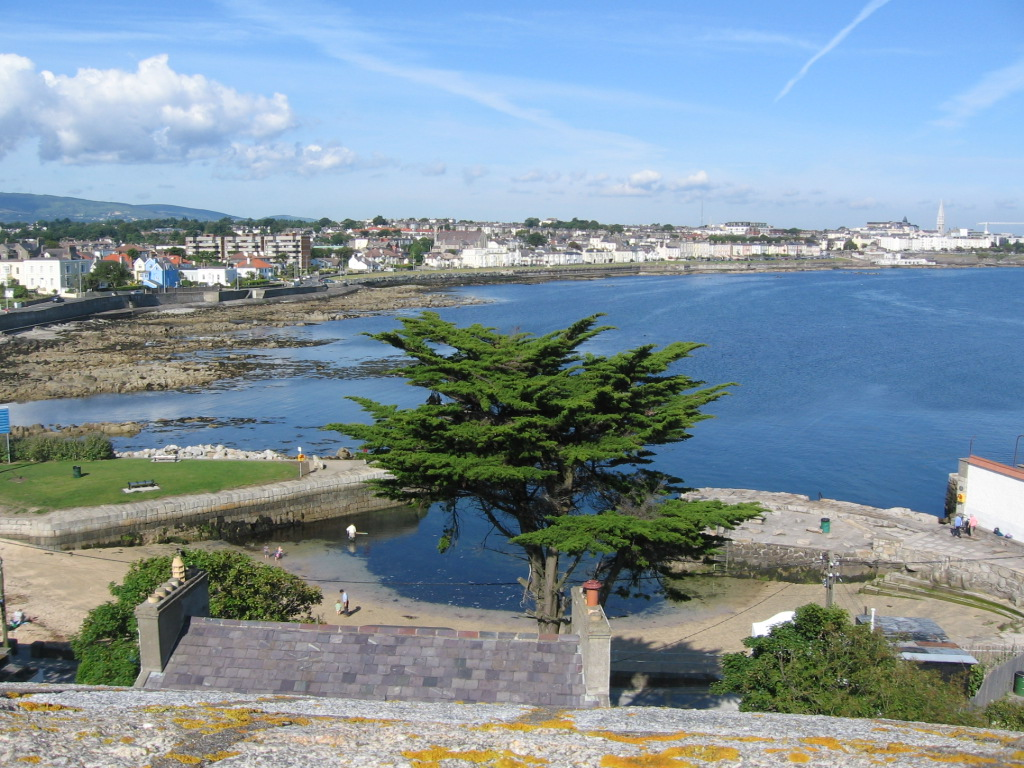
North view from above the tower, 2009

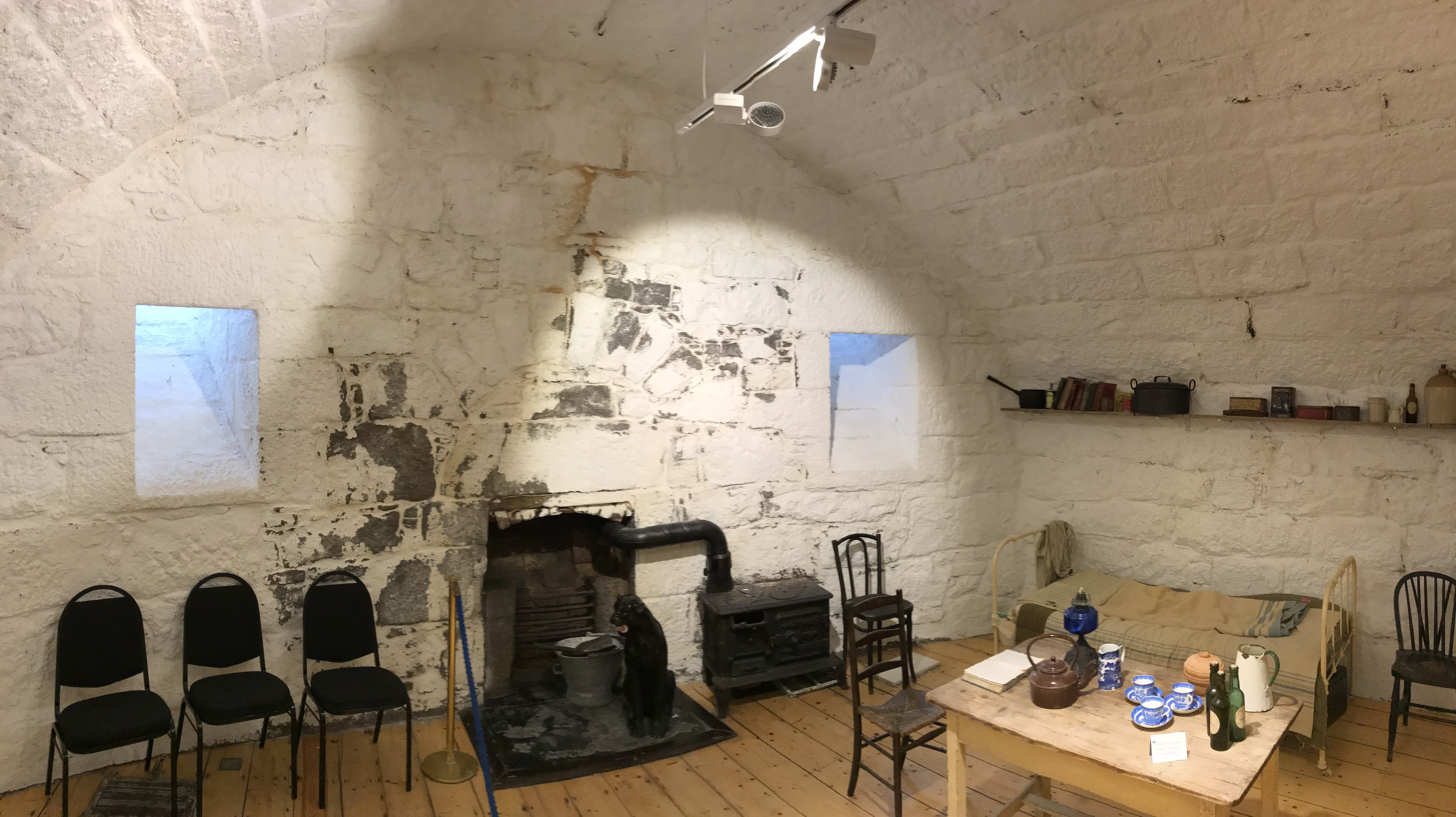
Living area in the tower, 2019

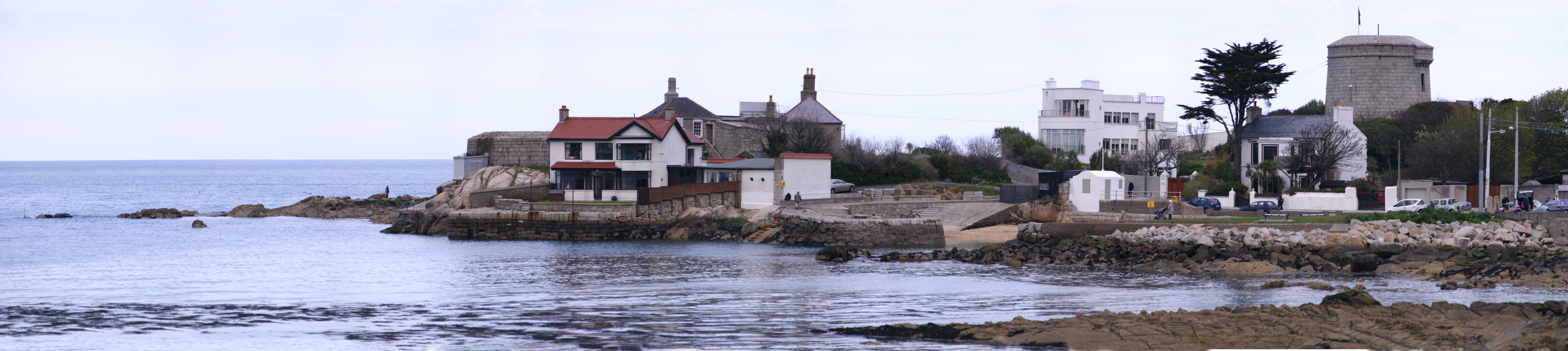
View of Sandycove, Michael Scott's 1937 white Art Deco house Geragh, and the Joyce Tower

== See also ==
- Forty Foot, a sea swimming place, one hundred metres from the tower
