= Séamus Ryan =

Irish politician (1893–1933)

- Ryan in 1931

Senator
- In office 9 December 1931 – 30 June 1933

Personal details
- Born: 2 December 1893 Kilfeacle, County Tipperary, Ireland
- Died: 30 June 1933 (aged 37) Rathgar, Dublin, Ireland
- Party: Fianna Fáil
- Spouse: Agnes Veronica Harding
- Children: 8

Séamus Ryan (2 December 1893 – 30 June 1933) was a member of the Seanad Éireann from 1931 to 1933 representing the Fianna Fáil party.

== Early life ==
He was born at the family farm in the townland of Deerpark in the County Tipperary Parish of Kilfeacle in 1895 and attended Bansha National School. Early in his life he had been a supporter of the moderate Irish nationalist John Redmond, but family links made him increasingly sympathetic and committed to the Irish republican cause. Ryan married Agnes Harding from Solohead, County Tipperary, in 1918. In that year they also opened a shop in Parnell Street, Dublin. It was the first of 33 outlets for the company they named The Monument Creameries after the famous monument to the Irish nationalist Charles Stewart Parnell located near their shop.

During the Irish War of Independence the shop was a haven for members of the Irish Republican Army seeking refuge from British "Black and Tans" and later for Republicans during the post-Treaty conflicts. Among the Irish nationalists harboured within his Parnell Street shop was Seán Treacy who established a workshop where he put false bottoms on butter boxes to conceal dispatches and ammunition for IRA operations. Ryan transported the boxes by horse and cart to Kingsbridge Station. It was said he had "a face of such truly angelic innocence that no one could have guessed the subversive nature of his freight". Cash from the business funded the republican cause and later the new Fianna Fáil Party.

== Political career ==
Ryan was a member, organiser and campaigner for the fledgling Fianna Fáil party. A self-made businessman, he was not representative of the party's core support base of labourers and farmers. But he was a generous donor and valuable advocate for their protectionist policies within business circles. In 1932, the de Valera government enacted the Dairy Produce (Price Stabilisation) Act, in response to high import duties imposed by the British on Irish dairy products during the Anglo-Irish trade war. The law capped the domestic price of butter. Ryan assisted negotiations with retailers who were required to sell butter for a reduced price so that farmers were not disadvantaged. In 1927, he gathered an impressive twelve thousand pounds towards the establishment of The Irish Press a new national newspaper sponsored by Éamon de Valera that appeared for the first time in September 1931.

In November 1931, Ryan won pre-selection from among 70 possible candidates to contest Seanad elections held in December 1931. Ryan was one of four additional Fianna Fáil senators elected to the Seanad in December 1931, a precursor to their major electoral success at the 1932 general election that resulted in the transfer of government from the Cumann na nGaedheal to Fianna Fáil.

== Other interests ==
He was a student of the Irish language and a patron of Irish artists. His purchases included a portrait of Éamon de Valera by Seán O'Sullivan that was given to the subject in 1933. He was a patron of the South Kildare Beekeepers Association and a Member of the Third Order of Saint Francis.

== Death ==
Ryan's political career was cut short when he died suddenly at his residence "Rockdale" located on Orwell Road, Rathgar in Dublin on 30 June 1933. He was given a state funeral. Éamon de Valera and every member of his cabinet (with one exception) were in attendance. The centre of Dublin came to a standstill as the forty vehicle cortège passed thousands of sympathisers that lined Parnell Street before it paused for two minutes outside the head offices of Monument Creameries in Camden Street. Finally the tricolour draped coffin was carried to its resting place, just metres from the grave of Jeremiah O'Donovan Rossa in the Republican Plot at Glasnevin Cemetery on the shoulders of Daniel Breen TD his friend, parliamentary colleague and Irish revolutionary hero.

== Family ==
Séamus and Agnes Ryan had eight children and many have made significant contributions to the arts and public life. Kathleen Ryan was an international motion picture actress who starred with James Mason in the Odd Man Out and other films. Cora Ryan attempted unsuccessfully in 1969 to enter the Dáil in a by-election caused by the death of her husband Seán Dunne TD. John Ryan was an accomplished painter who inaugurated the literary magazine Envoy, A Review of Literature and Art and was one of the instigators of the Bloomsday commemoration of the work of Irish writer James Joyce. Patrick Ryan joined the Royal Air Force before returning to Dublin to manage the Monument Creameries. Their third daughter Máire Ryan married a RAF officer. Oonagh Ryan married a Russian Prince Alexis Guedroitz and their daughter Princess Ania Guédroïtz is a Belgian actress. Their youngest son, Séamus Ryan became Dom Vincent, a Benedictine Monk at Glenstal Abbey, Limerick. The youngest, Íde Ni Riain became a nun at the Mount Anville Convent in Dublin.
