= John Ryan (artist) =

Irish artist, broadcaster, publisher, critic, editor, and publican

First Bloomsday: John Ryan, Anthony Cronin, Brian O'Nolan, Patrick Kavanagh & Tom Joyce (James Joyce's cousin) 1954

John Ryan (1925–1992) was an Irish artist, broadcaster, publisher, critic, editor, and publican.

Ryan was a well-known man of letters, an artist and a key figure in bohemian Dublin of the 1940s and 1950s. He founded Envoy, A Review of Literature and Art, in response to Irish trade and censorship restrictions. Friend and intimate (and sometime benefactor) to a number of struggling artists and writers in the post-war era, such as Patrick Kavanagh and Brendan Behan; Ryan's memoirs, Remembering How We Stood, evoke literary Dublin of the period 1945–55. Involved in numerous literary events and happenings and, with Brian O'Nolan, organised the first Bloomsday.

== Biography ==
John Ryan attended Clongowes Wood College and the National College of Art and Design (NCAD), Dublin. One of the eight children of Séamus Ryan, a member of Seanad Éireann, and his wife Agnes Ryan née Harding who came from Kilfeacle and Solohead respectively in County Tipperary and who were Republican activists during the Irish War of Independence. His mother was a patron of the painter Jack Yeats, amongst others. His sister was the actress Kathleen Ryan. Several of Ryan's children followed him into the arts: son and namesake John Ryan (journalist, publisher and actor) Anna Livia Ryan (actress).

John Ryan studied at the NCAD, but was largely a self-taught painter through a practice of 'careful intelligent observation' combined with 'a genuine and humorous love of land, sea and human tradition' (Hilary Pyle, 'John Ryan exhibition in Cork', The Irish Times, 23 October 1981). He was a regular exhibitor at the Royal Hibernian Academy (RHA) from 1946 onwards, and also showed at the annual Oireachtas and the Irish Exhibition of Living Art (IELA). Designed theatre sets for the Abbey, Gate, Olympia and Gaiety Theatres as well as for the stage in London. He also acted in and produced several plays.

In response to Irish trade and censorship restrictions founded Envoy, A Review of Literature and Art (1949–1951), and was editor of The Dublin Magazine from 1970 to 1975. As a writer and critic he contributed to literary magazines and newspapers. Publishing two memoirs, Remembering How We Stood, a memoir of post-war literary Dublin, and A Wave of the Sea (Ward River, 1981), a marine memoir. A broadcaster from the early 1950s he became a long-time contributor to Sunday Miscellany on Radio Éireann (RTÉ Radio). Purchased The Bailey pub in 1957 which became a famous literary venue frequented by characters such as Kavanagh, O'Nolan, et al. A friend and intimate to a number of struggling artists and writers in the post-war period, such as Behan, Anthony Cronin, Patrick Swift, Seán O'Sullivan, Pearse Hutchinson, J. P. Donleavy and Brian O'Nolan, et al., he was also a benefactor to some of these artists, particularly Patrick Kavanagh. During the war years he very cheaply rented a space above the family's Monument Creameries store (now a Burger King) on Grafton Street to sculptor Desmond MacNamara, and which became the site for a famous bohemian salon attended by all of the foregoing names and many more.

Ryan was an important early champion of James Joyce's work in Ireland at a time when Joyce was largely ignored in his homeland: with Brian O'Nolan he organised the first Bloomsday celebration; in 1951 to commemorate the tenth anniversary of the death of James Joyce he published a special number of Envoy dedicated to Joyce "which would reflect the attitudes and opinions of his fellow countryman towards their illustrious compatriot" (Envoy, Vol. 5, No. 17, April 1951), inviting Brian O'Nolan to be guest editor; edited A Bash in the Tunnel: James Joyce by the Irish, Patrick Kavanagh, Brian O'Nolan, Samuel Beckett, Ulick O'Connor, Edna O'Brien (Brighton: Clifton Books 1970); saved Leopold Bloom's front door to 7 Eccles Street from demolition and used it in The Bailey pub in St. Anne Street, Dublin, from whence it was removed and transported to the Joyce Museum on N. Gt. George's St., Oct. 1995; arranged that the James Joyce Tower become a museum; Secretary of the James Joyce Society of Ireland 1970–74.

== Envoy ==
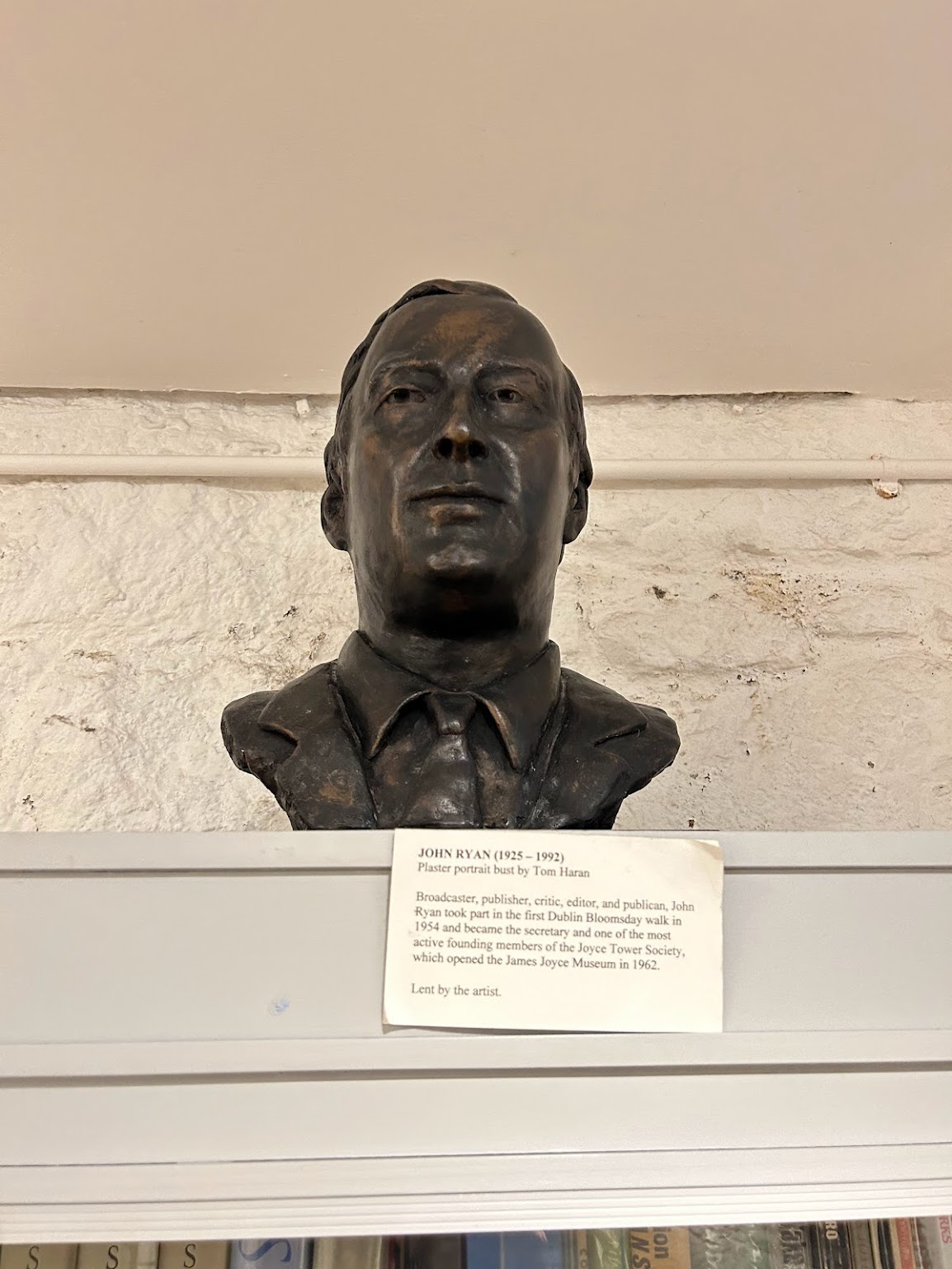
John Ryan's plaster portrait in James Joyce Tower by Tom Haran

December 1949– July 1951. Founded and edited by Ryan. Envoy was inaugurated in response to Irish trade and censorship restrictions which had forced many writers to seek publication outside their homeland. During its brief existence, Envoy, A Review of Literature and Art, published the work of a broad range of writers, Irish and others. The first to publish J. P. Donleavy, Brendan Behan's first short stories and his first poem, and an extract from Samuel Beckett's Watt. Envoy included Patrick Kavanagh's infamous monthly "Diary". Brian O'Nolan was another substantial contributor and was "honorary editor" for the special number commemorating James Joyce.

== Remembering How We Stood ==
An affectionate account of Bohemian Dublin in the 1950s with Behan, Kavanagh, J. P. Donleavy (q.v.), Anthony Cronin and other Dublin characters. Ryan:

Dublin was a town of 'characters' then as now, and I suppose will ever be. A man I knew was taking a stroll down Grafton Street one day when he happened to overhear part of a discussion which three citizens were having outside Mitchell's café. The gist of their dialogue was that they were deploring the absence from the Dublin scene of any real 'characters'. They appeared to be genuinely aggrieved. They were, in fact, Myles na gCopaleen, Sean O'Sullivan and Brendan Behan.

From the foreword by J. P. Donleavy:

As one reads his words, dressed in their wonderful finery of irony, the world he speaks of reblossoms to be back again awhile. To see, feel and smell the Dublin of that day... a masterpiece of reminiscence.

== First Bloomsday Celebration ==
Bloomsday (a term Joyce himself did not employ) was invented in 1954, the 50th anniversary, when John Ryan and the novelist Flann O'Brien organised what was to be a daylong pilgrimage along the Ulysses route. They were joined by Patrick Kavanagh, Anthony Cronin, Tom Joyce (a dentist who, as Joyce's cousin, represented the family interest) and AJ Leventhal (Registrar of Trinity College). Ryan had engaged two horse drawn cabs, of the old-fashioned kind, which in Ulysses Mr. Bloom and his friends drive to poor Paddy Dignam's funeral. The party were assigned roles from the novel. They planned to travel round the city through the day, visiting in turn the scenes of the novel, ending at night in what had once been the brothel quarter of the city, the area which Joyce had called Nighttown. The pilgrimage was abandoned halfway through, when the weary pilgrims succumbed to inebriation and rancour at the Bailey pub in the city centre, which Ryan then owned, and at which, in 1967, he installed the door to No. 7 Eccles Street (Leopold Bloom's front door) having rescued it from demolition . A Bloomsday record of 1954, informally filmed by John Ryan, follows this pilgrimage.

== Patrick Kavanagh: 'O commemorate me where there is water' ==
Whenever you mention Patrick Kavanagh's seat on the Grand Canal Dublin, most people will immediately think of the more famous park bench with the statue of Paddy himself sitting to one side of the seat almost beckoning for someone to sit down beside him. This bench is situated on the north bank of the Grand Canal between Baggot Street Bridge and the upstream Eustace Bridge. John Coll produced the sculpture and the seat was unveiled by President Mary Robinson on 11 June 1991, however this is not the original seat. Only a relatively few people will be aware of the lesser known original Kavanagh seat situated on the South Bank at the Lock Gates close to Baggot Street Bridge. As is well known from his poem and heavy hints to his friends, he wished to be commemorated with a simple canal side seat near the lock gates of Baggot Street Bridge. To this effect shortly after his death in 1967, a committee was formed by the late John Ryan and Denis Dwyer to collect a sum of money to purchase the materials and labour for the seat. The seat was erected in the poet's memory by his friends in 1968.

== Bibliography ==
Writer

- Remembering How We Stood, John Ryan (Gill and Macmillan, Dublin, 1975)
- A Wave of the Sea, John Ryan (Ward River, 1981)

Editor / publisher

- Envoy, A Review of Literature and Art (1949–1951)
- The Dublin Magazine (1970–75)
- A Bash In The Tunnel: James Joyce by the Irish, (ed.) John Ryan (Brighton: Clifton Books, 1970)

Relating to

- Dead as Doornails, Anthony Cronin (Dolmen Press, Dublin, 1976)
- Patrick Kavanagh: A Biography, Antoinette Quinn (Gill & Macmillan, 2003)
- Flann O’Brien, an illustrated biography by Costello and Van der Kamp (1987)
- No Laughing Matter: The Life and Times of Flann O'Brien, Anthony Cronin (New Island Books, 2003)
- Young John McGahern: Becoming a Novelist, Denis Sampson (Oxford University Press, Feb 2012)
- Patrick Swift 1927–83, (ed.) Veronica O'Mara (Gandon Editions, Kinsale, 1993)
- Joyce's Critics: Transitions in Reading and Culture, By Joseph Brooker (The University of Wisconsin Press, May 2004)
- The Irish Literary Periodical 1923–1958, Frank Shovlin, Oxford English Monographs, Oxford University Press, United States (12 February 2004), p136 Google Books
- "An Interview with John Ryan" The Journal of Irish Literature 17 (January 1988)
- The Life and Ideas of James Hillman: The Making of a Psychologist, Dick Russell, Arcade Publishing (2013) Google Books
