= Forty Foot =

Promontory in Ireland

Forty Foot Cladach an Daichead Troigh (Irish)
- Promontory
- Location within Dublin Location within Ireland
- Coordinates: 53°17′22″N 6°06′49″W
- Grid position: O 25829 28205
- Part of: Dublin Bay

Dimensions
  - Depth: 20 ft (6.1 m) at high tide

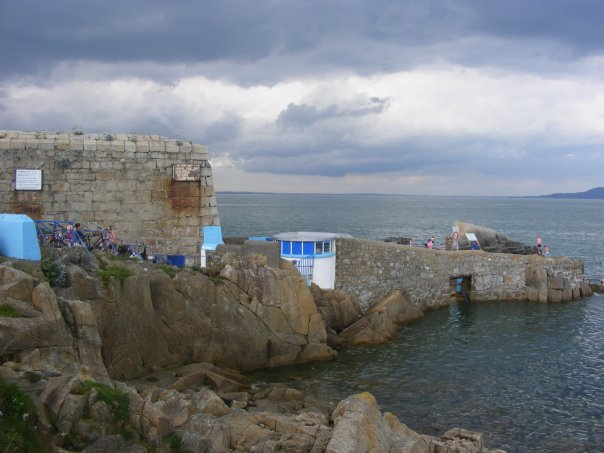
Forty Foot changing rooms and clubhouse kitchen, 2008

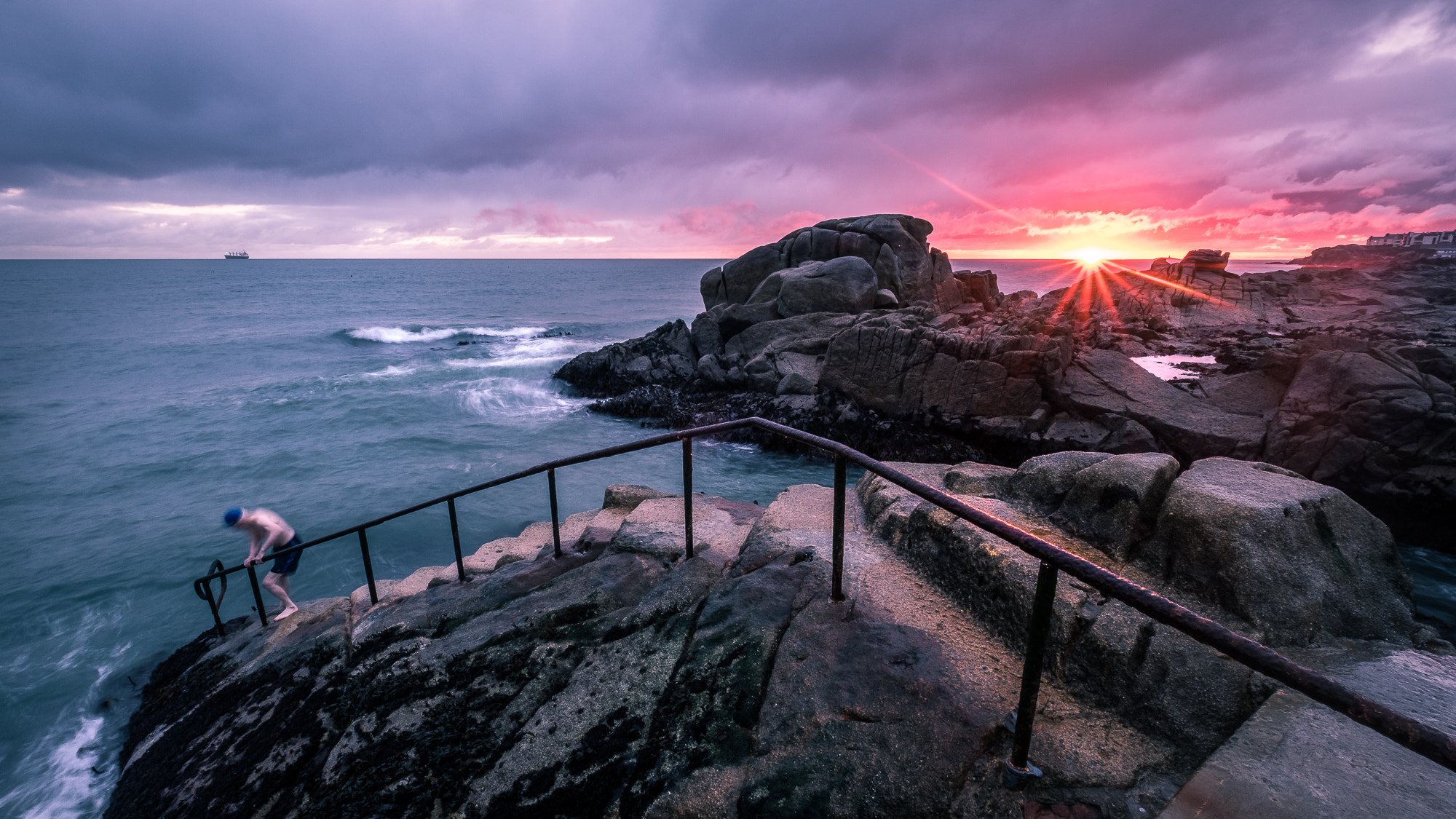
Sunrise at the Forty Foot, 2018

The Forty Foot (Irish: Cladach an Daichead Troigh) is a promontory on the southern tip of Dublin Bay at Sandycove, County Dublin, Ireland, from which people have been swimming in the Irish Sea all year round for some 250 years.

== Name ==
The name "Forty Foot" is somewhat obscure. On an 1833 map, the Marine Road (located 1.5 km (0.93 mi) to the west) was named the Forty Foot Road, possibly because it was 40 ft (12 m) wide; the name may have been transferred to the swimming place, which was called the Forty-Foot Hole in the 19th century.

Other accounts claim the name was given by fishermen because it was forty feet (6 2/3 fathoms) deep, but the water in the area is no deeper than 20 ft (6.1 m; 3.3 fathoms). Others have attempted to link it to the 40th (the 2nd Somersetshire) Regiment of Foot, who supposedly bathed there, but they were stationed at Richmond Barracks in Inchicore.

== Use ==
At first, it was exclusively a male bathing place, and Sandycove Bathers Association, a men's swimming club, was established. Owing to its relative isolation and gender-restrictions it became a popular spot for nudists. On 24 July 1974, about a dozen female equal-rights activists ("Dublin City Women’s Invasion Force") went swimming, and sat with placards. Later, a few women swam nude in 1989. Now swimming is open to men, women, and children. In 2014, the Sandycove Bathers Association ended the ban on women club members, and they may now use the onsite changing rooms and clubhouse kitchen. The swimming club requests voluntary contributions for the upkeep of the area.

== Safety ==
Death, near-drowning and hypothermia have resulted from swimming at Forty Foot.

== In literature ==
James Joyce and Oliver St. John Gogarty once resided at the Martello tower together. It is now the James Joyce Tower and Museum. The opening section of Joyce's Ulysses is set here, with the characters Stephen Dedalus and Buck Mulligan being partly based on Joyce himself and Gogarty, respectively. Buck Mulligan described the sea as "The snotgreen sea. The scrotumtightening sea."

The Forty Foot also featured in the novels At Swim-Two-Birds by Flann O'Brien (1939), At Swim, Two Boys by Jamie O'Neill (2001), Nessuna notizia dello scrittore scomparso by Daniele Bresciani (2017),The Elements by John Boyne (2025), and Again Rachel by Marian Keyes (2022).

== In media ==
The Forty Foot is featured in the series Bad Sisters.

In the 2023 documentary film Bono & The Edge: A Sort of Homecoming, With Dave Letterman, David Letterman visits the location, which ends up serving as inspiration for the composition of a song by Bono and the Edge called "40 Foot Man" featured in the credits of the show.

== Images ==
Forty Foot

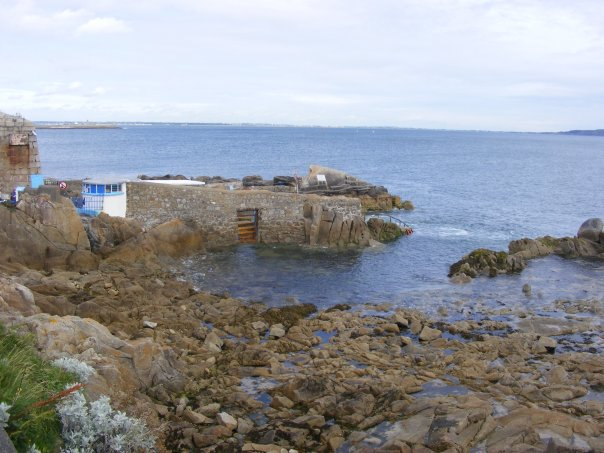
Forty Foot changing rooms and clubhouse kitchen, 2008

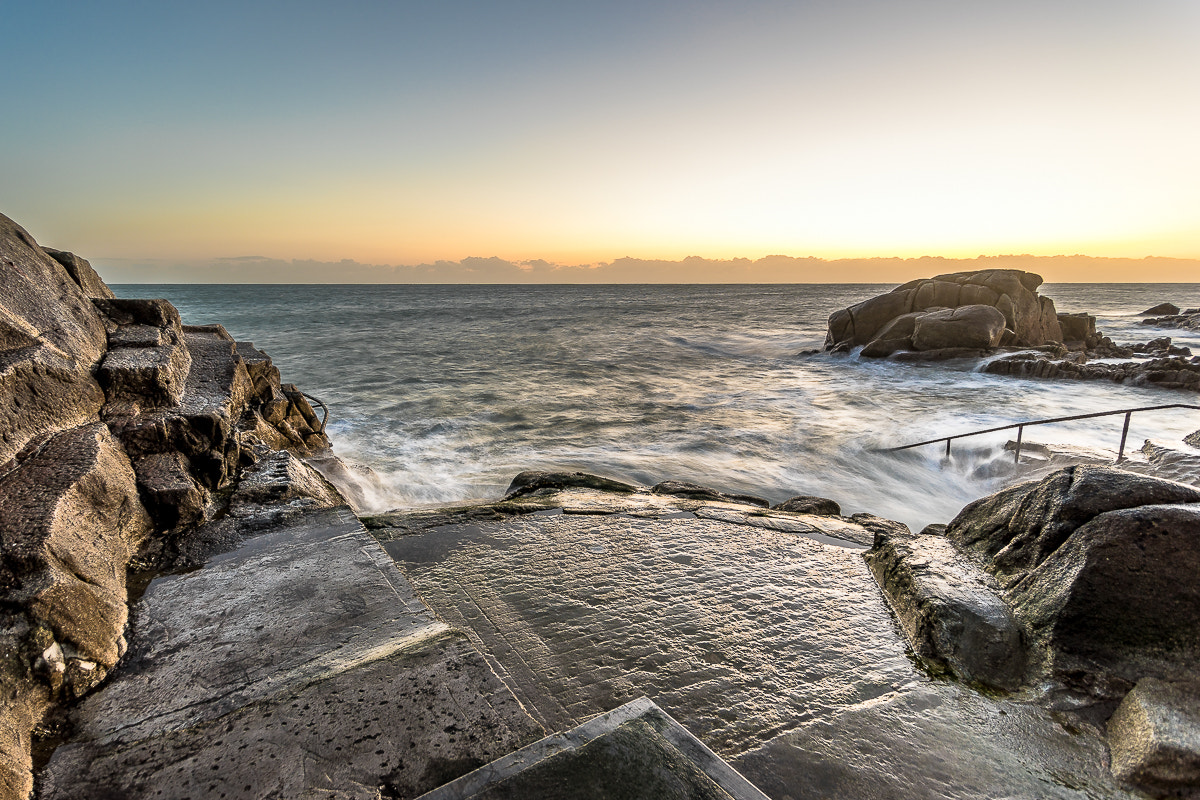
Sunrise at the Forty Foot, 2015

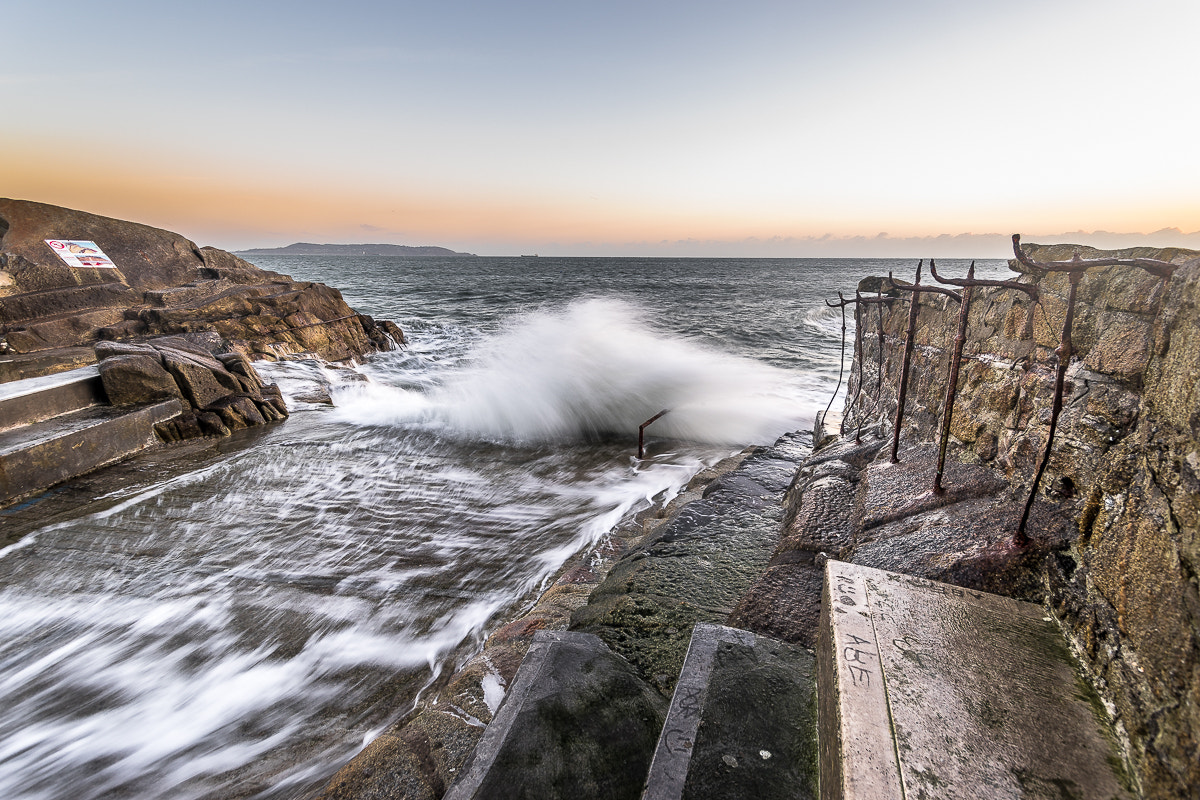
Sunrise at the Forty Foot, 2015
