= Duke Street, Dublin =

Street in Dublin, Ireland

Duke Street
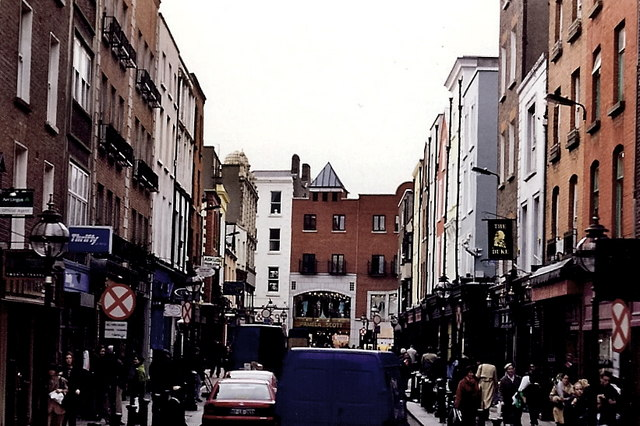
- Duke Street in 1998
- Interactive map of Duke Street
- Native name: Sráid an Diúic (Irish)
- Namesake: Henry FitzRoy, 1st Duke of Grafton
- Location: Dublin, Ireland
- Postal code: D02
- Coordinates: 53°20′31″N 6°15′33″W
- west end: Grafton Street
- Major junctions: Duke Lane Upper, Duke Lane Lower
- east end: Dawson Street

Construction
- Construction start: 1690s

Duke Street (Irish: Sráid an Diúic) is a partly pedestrianised street in central Dublin which connects Grafton Street at the west and Dawson Street to the east.

== History ==
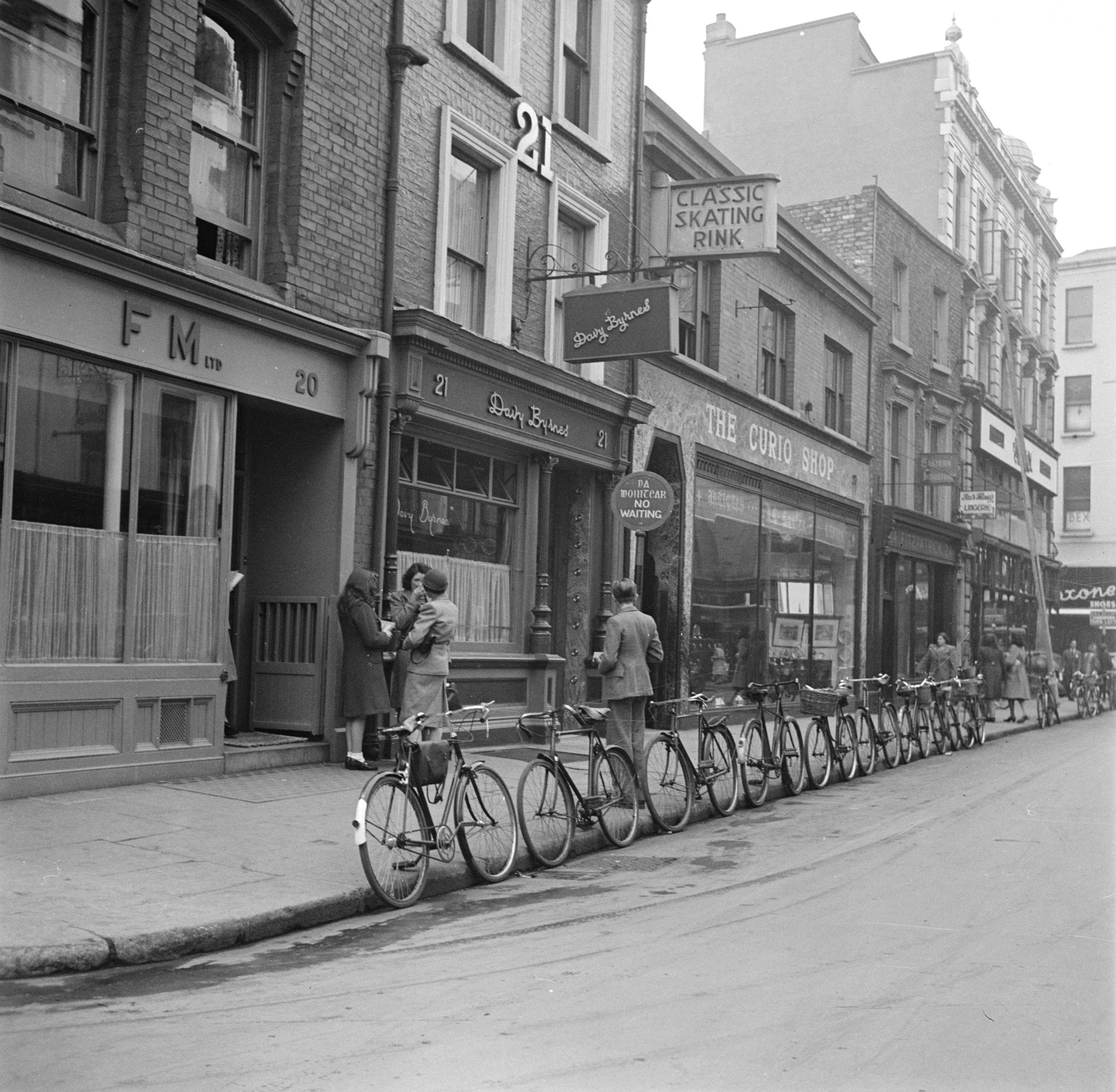
Duke Street in 1946 showing Davy Byrne's Pub

Duke Street was developed from developed from around 1709 by Joshua Dawson along with South Anne Street, Grafton Street, and Dawson Street. The name of the street was attributed to the Viceroy Henry FitzRoy, 1st Duke of Grafton, by Charles McCready and appears named in the Dublin Intelligence in 1724 before appearing set out with buildings along its sides on Charles Brooking's map of Dublin (1728).

The adjoining Duke Lane was previously known as Badger's Lane.

== Architecture ==
Duke Street contained a number of extant Georgian town houses, with just one remaining intact into the 21st century, number 17, dating from between 1720 and 1730. This house has an intact Georgian exterior which other adjoining properties would have previously had also.

== Notable buildings and businesses ==
- Davy Byrne's pub as mentioned in James Joyce's 1922 novel Ulysses.
- The Bailey pub, popular with literary figures of the early and mid-20th century including Patrick Kavanagh and Brendan Behan.
- The Duke pub, established in 1822.
- Ulysses Rare books (formerly Cathach Books), bookshop dealing in rare and collectable books.
- Duke Street Gallery, gallery in a Georgian town house.
