= Envoy, A Review of Literature and Art =

20th century Irish magazine

'James Joyce', Envoy, Vol. 5, No. 17 (April 1951); special number dedicated to James Joyce with contributions by Brian O'Nolan (honorary editor for this particular issue), Patrick Kavanagh, Denis Johnston and William Bedell Stanford, among others; later expanded into a book, A Bash In The Tunnel: James Joyce by the Irish, ed. John Ryan, Samuel Beckett, Patrick Kavanagh, Brian O'Nolan, Ulick O'Connor, Edna O'Brien (Brighton: Clifton Books, 1970)

Envoy, A Review of Literature and Art was a magazine published in Dublin, Ireland, from December 1949 to July 1951. It was founded and edited by John Ryan.

During its brief existence, it published the work of a broad range of writers, Irish and others. The first to publish J. P. Donleavy, Brendan Behan's first short stories and his first poem, and an extract from Samuel Beckett's Watt, Envoy was begun by John Ryan, a Dublin artist, who was editor and prime mover. Among the distinguished associate editors were Valentin Iremonger, Irish diplomat and poet who served as poetry editor, James Hillman (who began his career as associate editor for Envoy, Michael Huron, and Owen Quinn. Envoy included Patrick Kavanagh's infamous monthly "Diary". Brian O'Nolan was also a contributor (once writing a "counter-diary" to Kavanagh's Diary) and was "honorary editor" for the special number commemorating James Joyce.

In December 1949 Envoy was inaugurated in response to Irish trade and censorship restrictions which had forced many writers to seek publication outside their homeland. Though the Envoy Publishing Company's goal of publishing books died with the magazine in July 1951, the short-lived enterprise succeeded, with the lone publication of Valentin Iremonger's prize-winning book of poetry, Reservations, and with its lively magazine, in breaching some of the barriers of Irish publication, as well as providing outstanding prose, poetry, criticism, and reviews of the contemporary Irish art scene during its twenty-month existence.

The Envoy offices were located at 39 Grafton Street but most of the journal's business was conducted in the nearby pub, McDaid's, according to Antoinette Quinn in Patrick Kavanagh: A Biography: "Around one o'clock the Envoy office would empty itself into John McDaid's, a small, narrow, high-ceilinged pub at 3 Harry Street, where much of the journal's business was conducted. The clientele was a mixture of working class and bohemian."

== Contributors ==
Among Envoy contributors were Samuel Beckett, Brendan Behan, Brian O'Nolan, Patrick Kavanagh (who wrote the monthly "Diary"), Anthony Cronin, Patrick Swift, J. P. Donleavy, John Jordan, Padraic Colum, Aidan Higgins, Pearse Hutchinson, Maria Jolas (in translation), Mary Lavin, Ewart Milne, Denis Devlin, Ethel Mannin, Lionel Miskin, Edward Sheehy, Aloys Fleischmann, Francis Stuart, Anton Chekhov (in translation), Arland Ussher, Thomas Woods, and many others.

== Founder and editor John Ryan ==
John Ryan (1925–1992) was a painter, broadcaster, publisher, critic, editor and publican. He was the son of Senator Séamus Ryan, owner of The Monument Creameries shops in Dublin; and the brother of the film actress Kathleen Ryan. John Ryan studied at the NCA, but was largely a self-taught painter. He was a regular exhibitor at the RHA from 1946 onwards, and also showed at the annual Oireachtas and the IELA. He designed theatre sets for the Abbey, Gate, Olympia and Gaiety Theatres as well as for the stage in London. He acted in and produced several plays. From 1969 to 1974 Ryan was editor of The Dublin Magazine. He was a broadcaster, being a long-time contributor to Sunday Miscellany on Radio Éireann. In 1975 he published a book of his reminiscences of literary Dublin entitled Remembering How We Stood, featuring stories of his friends including Behan, Kavanagh, J. P. Donleavy (q.v.) and Anthony Cronin along with the many Dublin characters who patronised his famous pub, The Bailey, in Duke Street. He was also a patron to many artists.

First Bloomsday celebration: Bloomsday (a term Joyce himself did not employ) was invented in 1954, the 50th anniversary, when John Ryan and the novelist Flann O'Brien organised what was to be a daylong pilgrimage along the Ulysses route. They were joined by Patrick Kavanagh, Anthony Cronin, Tom Joyce (Joyce’s cousin and the only family representative that Ryan could find) and A. J. ("Con") Leventhal (Registrar of Trinity College, Dublin). A Bloomsday record of 1954, informally filmed by John Ryan, follows this pilgrimage.

== Bibliography/ Further reading/ External links ==
- Remembering How We Stood, John Ryan (Gill and Macmillan, Dublin, 1975)
- Patrick Kavanagh: A Biography, Antoinette Quinn (Gill & Macmillan, 2003)
- Dead as Doornails, Anthony Cronin (Dolmen Press, Dublin, 1976)
- Envoy the literary magazine that sought to put Irish culture on the map, Irish Times, 17 August 2015
- John Ryan (1925–92) Ricorso.net
- Irish Literature Collections Portal – Southern Illinois University – Morris Library
- Southern Illinois University
- The Irish Literary Periodical 1923–1958, Frank Shovlin, Oxford English Monographs, Oxford University Press, USA (February 12, 2004), p136 Google Books
- The Life and Ideas of James Hillman: The Making of a Psychologist, Dick Russell, Arcade Publishing (2013) Google Books
- Denis Sampson (2012). Young John McGahern: Becoming a Novelist, Oxford University Press
- Joyce's Critics: Transitions in Reading and Culture, By Joseph Brooker (The University of Wisconsin Press, May 2004)
- A Bash In The Tunnel (James Joyce by the Irish), (ed.) John Ryan (Brighton: Clifton Books 1970)
- Flann O'Brien: An Illustrated Biography, Peter Costello & Peter Van De Kamp (London Bloomsbury 1987)
- No Laughing Matter: The Life and Times of Flann O'Brien, Anthony Cronin (New Island Books, 2003)
- First Bloomsday
- Envoy, A Review of Literature and Art Records, 1949–1951 Archived 4 March 2012 at the Wayback Machine at Southern Illinois University Carbondale, Special Collections Research Center
- J.P. Donleavy Archived 23 July 2008 at the Wayback Machine
- James Hillman – Obituary – Irish Independent – 2011
- worldcat – ArchiveGrid
- A. J. Leventhal – ricorso.net
