= At Swim, Two Boys =

2001 novel by Jamie O'Neill

- Author: Jamie O'Neill
- Language: English
- Genre: Fiction
- Publisher: Scribner
- Publication date: 2001
- Publication place: Ireland
- Media type: Print (Hardcover)
- Pages: 643 pages
- ISBN: 0-7432-0713-0
- OCLC: 47037422
- Dewey Decimal: 823/.914 21
- LC Class: PR6065.N4194 A92 2001

At Swim, Two Boys (2001) is a novel by Irish writer Jamie O'Neill. The title is a punning allusion to Flann O'Brien's At Swim-Two-Birds. The book is written in a stream-of-consciousness style, which has led to favourable comparisons to James Joyce.

Ten years after publication, Alison Walsh, reviewing the year 2001 for the Sunday Independent, called it "a vintage one in Irish writing", specifically naming the "unforgettable" At Swim, Two Boys alongside books by Dermot Bolger, Eoin Colfer and Nuala O'Faolain. Terry Pender commented on At Swim, Two Boys: "With only this work O'Neill can take his rightful place among the great Irish writers beginning with Joyce and ending with Roddy Doyle".

== Plot summary ==
Set in Dublin before and during the 1916 Easter Rising, At Swim, Two Boys tells the love story of two Irish boys: Jim Mack and Doyler Doyle. Jim goes to school on a scholarship (for which he is looked down upon) – he is quiet, studious, thoughtful, and naïve. In contrast, Doyler is outspoken, rebellious, brave, and affectionate. Doyler might once have received a scholarship, like Jim, but Doyler withdrew from school to find work and support his impoverished family, leading the pair to grow apart. They have an additional connection through their fathers, who served in the army together during the Boer War, and were once best friends.

=== Events of 1915 ===
Jim attends a Catholic school, regularly attends church, and plays in the school's flute band, where he is the object of his Latin teacher's obsession. Brother Polycarp likes to have extra prayer sessions with him alone, during which Jim is subject to mild sexual pawing whose nature he does not understand; Jim reminds Polycarp of his own past. Unbeknown to his father, Jim is offered the chance of a vocation to join the brothers of the church. When Doyler joins the flute band, their old friendship is renewed. Doyler takes Jim out to the Forty Foot, a well known swimming area in Dublin Bay for a swim. The two boys make a pact: Doyler will teach Jim to swim, and in a year, on Easter Sunday, 1916, they will swim to the distant island of Muglins Rock and claim it for themselves. As their friendship grows, Jim reconsiders his vocation, ultimately refusing; Brother Polycarp is emotionally stricken and has to resign. Meanwhile, patriots appear on the novel's stage: Madame Eveline MacMurrough continues to support the idea of Ireland's liberty. The clergy also supports the patriotic body of thought, in particular, Father Amen O'Toiler – who pushes the boys church's flute band to resemble a regimental band. Even Jim's father, Mr. Mack, who is proud having served as a soldier in an Irish Battalion, is swollen with pride for the boys in MacMurrough's garden, seeing them all in uniform kilts.

Only Anthony MacMurrough, the nephew of Eveline MacMurrough, turns away from their politics. After his return from imprisonment in England, for acts of gross indecency, his nationalist aunt Eveline MacMurrough is determined to redeem his reputation through a prosperous marriage. In a garden party, Eveline MacMurrough introduces him to Irish society, pushing him to follow her patriotic ideals. However, MacMurrough is still caught up in his memories of imprisonment, conversing with the internal voice of his alter ego, Scrotes, on the fate of homosexuals.

In the meantime, Doyler works to help support his family, which has been driven to poverty by Mr. Doyle's alcoholism and illness. Doyler accepts payment from MacMurrough in return for sexual favours. Although Doyler is depicted as accepting his own sexuality, his response to the older man is ambiguous and ultimately MacMurrough fails to attract the boy. Doyler, being a vehement Socialist and outcast from the society of his home community, leaves home and joins the Irish Citizen Army at Dublin.

=== Events of 1916 ===
Jim, bereft of the pal of his heart Doyler, befriends MacMurrough, who becomes a mentor to Jim, teaching about swimming as well as homosexuality and philosophy. MacMurrough finds that he is unable to rid himself of his fascination with the two boys, their relationship and their pact to swim to the Muglins and claim them for Ireland. The night before Easter Sunday, Doyler leaves his duties as army member and visits Jim. They renew their pact, confessing their love for each other. The next morning, Easter Sunday, Jim and Doyler successfully swim to the Muglins. Not only do they claim the islands with an Irish green flag, but they also make love to one another. On their swim back to the Forty Foot, as Doyler is close to drowning, MacMurrough rescues both of them.

While Doyler rests and recovers at MacMurrough's house, Jim feels responsible for the duties his friend cannot carry out. As the Easter Rising takes place, Jim grabs the uniform of Doyler and joins the fighting for the Irish Volunteers in Dublin's city centre. Meanwhile, MacMurrough does not realize Jim's action.

When Doyler discovers what Jim has done, both Doyler and MacMurrough go searching for Jim. As they approach St. Stephen's Green, in Dublin's city centre, where the fighting is occurring, Doyler sees Jim standing in the open. Just as the two are about to be reunited, Doyler is himself fatally wounded.

== Characters ==
Jim is the son of shopkeeper Mr. Mack, who runs a small shop for everyday people's needs at Glasthule, close to Dublin. Jim is depicted as a naïve scholar boy and has a shy appearance: Jim Mack is worried about self-abuse and going to hell as he tries to obey to rules of church. He responds to the more experienced Doyler with friendship, which turns to love – possibly even desire, but recoils from Doyler's movements towards intimacy; he would love to kiss his friend, but cannot. Despite his naivete and inhibitions, he has a clear mind, sharp ideas and thoughts. He sees the pact with Doyler to swim to the Muglins as a symbol of their union, their very own experience which no one can take from them.

Doyler is the rough diamond son of Mr. Doyle, who is Mr. Mack's old army pal. Doyler has grown up in poverty, hence he already knows quite a lot about life and is in no way naïve. Doyler used to be Jim's friend when they were about twelve, but Doyler left town for some time looking for work and his Irish roots . As Doyler returns, and the story unfolds, Jim and Doyler are both aged 15 to 16 years old. Doyler is sympathetic to the Irish workers front and later joins the Irish Citizen Army.

Madame Eveline MacMurrough is depicted as the daughter of a republican figure famous in the history of the local patriotic movement. In the name of Ireland she supports the troops at the Western Front with socks to warm the soldiers' feet, and organizes a garden party to enliven the patriotism of the local society and to support its clubs. Finally, she even backs the Republicans by providing them with weapons for the Easter Rising.

Anthony MacMurrough is the nephew of Eveline MacMurrough. Jim calls him McEmm as the story develops. Prior to the novel's action, MacMurrough has served a prison sentence in England of two years' hard labour for acts of gross indecency with a young chauffeur-mechanic. He seeks refuge with his aunt, Eveline MacMurrough in Ireland, bringing with him his prison experience, in the form of alter ego Scrotes, with which he soliloquises. His nationalist aunt pushes him to become a patriotic Irishman, mentoring and leading the young, and, in her imagination, eventually marrying. MacMurrough conforms to some degree but recognises his homosexuality as a permanent character trait. It is only when he becomes a mentor to Jim and Doyler individually, teaching them about swimming as well as homosexuality and philosophy, that he finds some degree of personal fulfilment.

== Awards and nominations ==
- 2002 Lambda Literary Award, section Gay men's fiction
- 2002 Ferro-Grumley Literary Award
- 2003 International IMPAC Dublin Literary Award nominated
- 2003 XV Premio Letterario Giuseppe Berto, section foreign fiction (Italy)

== Adaptations ==
=== Earthfall 2005 ===
Welsh dance company Earthfall created their 2005 production of At Swim Two Boys as the company's second collaboration with Jamie O’Neill and incorporated both live and archive film footage, live music, dance, and text.

The production was inspired by Jamie O’Neill's award-winning novel of the same name. Set in Ireland in 1916, the work juxtaposes the developing love affair between two young men with political turmoil in Ireland and the slaughter on the Western Front – contrasting the dream of national liberation and the search for personal freedom. The production is staged in a slowly filling lake in front of a waterfall and performed by two dancers and two musicians.

The original production toured for three years over 5 seasons with over 100 performances, playing to sell-out audiences in the UK, Ireland, the Netherlands, Croatia, and Germany.

=== Earthfall 2011 ===
Earthfall toured a re-edition of this dance production across the UK in Autumn 2011, to coincide with the 10th anniversary of the publication of the book.

=== Deux garçons, la mer ===
In September 2014 a play of this name was performed in Paris. Christophe Garro adapted the novel with Jamie's approval, and the characters of Jim, Doyler, McMurrough, and many others were created on stage. An English version of the play is available, and may be produced also. For more information visit the website : deuxgarconslamer.com

=== Rochester, NY 2018 ===
In December 2018 a play of this name was performed in Rochester, NY at the Multi-Use Community Cultural Center.
