= Glasthule =

Suburb of Dublin, Ireland

Glasthule Glas Tuathail (Irish)
- Suburb of Dublin
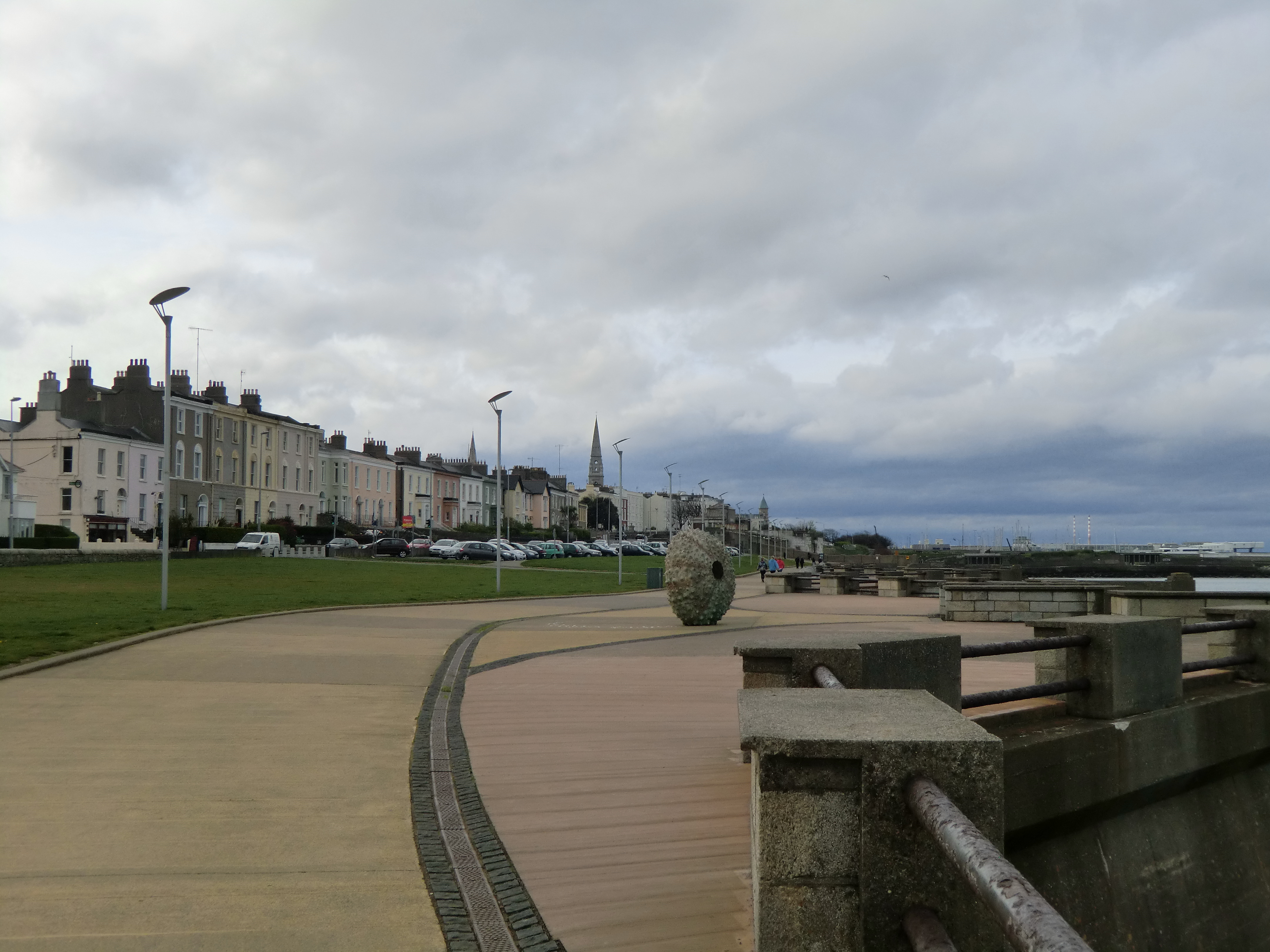
- coastline in Glasthule

- Location in Dublin Glasthule (Ireland)
- Coordinates: 53°17′14″N 6°07′25″W
- Country: Ireland
- Province: Leinster
- County: Dún Laoghaire–Rathdown

Population (2006)
  - Urban: 2,641
- Time zone: UTC+0 (WET)
  - Summer (DST): UTC-1 (IST (WEST))
- Eircode (Routing Key): A96
- Area code: 01 (+3531)

Glasthule (/ˈɡlæsθuːl/ GLAS-thool; Irish: Glas Tuathail, meaning 'O'Toole's Stream') is a suburb of Dublin, Ireland. It is along County Dublin’s south coast, between Dún Laoghaire, Sandycove, Glenageary and Dalkey.

== Amenities ==
Sandycove and Glasthule are served by a number of businesses and amenities, including retail outlets, public houses, a post office, restaurants, cafés and a playschool.

The Presentation Brothers maintain a house in Glasthule and ran Presentation College Glasthule, a secondary school for boys, until 2006. The Harold National School, next door to Presentation Brothers still operates today.

An Aircoach service links the area with Dublin Airport 24 hours a day.

== Popular culture ==
Every year on 16 June it celebrates Bloomsday (the day on which James Joyce's novel Ulysses takes place). The James Joyce Tower is located in nearby Sandycove.

It is the main setting for Jamie O'Neill's 2001 novel At Swim, Two Boys.

== Notable people ==
- Ronnie Drew, musician and singer with The Dubliners, born in Glasthule.

== See also ==
- List of towns and villages in Ireland
- Sandycove and Glasthule railway station
