= Jamie O'Neill =

Irish author

- Born: 1 January 1962 (age 64); Dún Laoghaire, Ireland
- Education: Presentation College, Glasthule, County Dublin, Ireland
- Occupation: Novelist
- Writing career
- Period: Early 21st century
- Genre: Historical fiction
- Subjects: Adolescence, colonialism, conflict, death, homosexuality, lust, good and evil, religion, sin, war
- Notable work: At Swim, Two Boys
- Notable awards: Ferro-Grumley Award for Fiction, Lambda Literary Award
- Literary movement: Stream of consciousness
- Website: www.iol.ie/~atswim/

Jamie O'Neill (born 1 January 1962) is an Irish author. His critically acclaimed novel, At Swim, Two Boys (2001), earned him the highest advance ever paid for an Irish novel and frequent praise as the natural successor to James Joyce, Flann O'Brien and Samuel Beckett. He is currently living in Gortachalla in County Galway, having previously lived and worked in England for two decades.

O'Neill's work follows the imaginative route in Irish literature, unlike his realist contemporaries such as Colm Tóibín or John McGahern. Terry Pender commented on At Swim, Two Boys: "With only this work O'Neill can take his rightful place among the great Irish writers beginning with Joyce and ending with Roddy Doyle".

== Background and education ==
O'Neill was born in Dún Laoghaire in 1962 the youngest of four children and was educated at Presentation College, Glasthule, County Dublin, run by the Presentation Brothers, and (in his words) "the city streets of London, the beaches of Greece." He was raised in a home without books, and first discovered that books "could be fun" when he read Ivanhoe by Sir Walter Scott, a copy of which he had received as a Christmas gift. It took him two weeks and was the first book he ever finished. O'Neill was unhappy at home; he had a very difficult relationship with his father and ran away at age 17.

He was raised a Catholic and has admitted to a fondness for the language of the Catholic Church, saying, "I like the words, the distinctions they have for sins. For example, "morose delectation." Beautiful. It's the dwelling on pleasure from sins already committed. I kind of admire something that's seen so far inside the soul that it can work out names for these things. Of course, I don't believe a word of it".

O'Neill lists as his favourite books: Ulysses, by James Joyce, The Last of the Wine, by Mary Renault, Hadrian the Seventh, by Frederick Rolfe (Frederick Baron Corvo), The History of the Decline and Fall of the Roman Empire, by Edward Gibbon, The Leopard, by Giuseppe Tomasi di Lampedusa, The Siege of Krishnapur, by J. G. Farrell, One Hundred Years of Solitude, by Gabriel García Márquez, The Third Policeman, by Flann O'Brien, The Swimming Pool Library, by Alan Hollinghurst, and The Lost Language of Cranes by David Leavitt.

He was one of the Irish delegates at the European Writers Conference in Istanbul in 2010.

== Personal life ==
Following a tumultuous relationship with his father, O'Neill left for England at the age of 17. There, he would continue to stay working at a paracetamol factory for some of the time, before returning to Ireland to live in Dalkey. His frequent excursions to London, though, are how O'Neill met with and began a relationship with TV presenter Russell Harty, who encouraged him to publish his work.

O'Neill stayed with Harty until his death in 1988. The British tabloid press, who had run multiple exposés about Harty during his fatal illness, approached O'Neill offering him money to sell his story. Though he rebuffed all these offers, the Sunday Mirror published a nude photo from his modelling days in London. Harty's family had O'Neill, who had no legal standing in the estate, removed from the presenter's house; during this difficult period he eventually became homeless.

His first novel, Disturbance, was published in 1989; Kilbrack followed in 1990. O'Neill struggled to write, parted company with both his agent and publisher, and took a job as a night porter at the Cassel Hospital, a psychiatric institution in Richmond, London from 1990 to 2000.

O'Neill was in a London pub when he noticed his dog was missing. Paddy had been found by a ballet dancer named Julien Joly. They began a relationship and Joly was instrumental in helping O'Neill put his life back together. During the ten years that followed, O'Neill wrote At Swim, Two Boys, which was published in 2001. The two events seemed to break the negative cycle of the author's life.

When published in Britain, Swim was likened to the work of Joyce. The book allowed O'Neill to quit his job as a porter and to open his first bank account.

Ten years after publication, Alison Walsh, reviewing the year 2001 for the Sunday Independent, called it "a vintage one in Irish writing", specifically naming the "unforgettable" At Swim, Two Boys alongside books by Dermot Bolger, Eoin Colfer and Nuala O'Faolain.

He and Julien Joly are no longer together.

== On writing ==
...the happiest place for me isn't Galway or Dublin, or Ireland, or France. It's the middle of a paragraph. When I was working on At Swim, Two Boys, I would be riding the bus, and the last sentence I'd written would still be ringing in my ears, and nothing else mattered but the positioning of an adverb. That's happiness.

— Jamie O'Neill discusses happiness, "Language of Love", a Metro Weekly interview with Jonathan Padget from 9 May 2002

The only advice I could ever give to anybody is to be true and persevere.

— Jamie O'Neill's advice to writers, "Language of Love", a Metro Weekly interview with Jonathan Padget from 9 May 2002

== Bibliography ==
- Disturbance (1989)
- Kilbrack (1990)
- At Swim, Two Boys (2001)

== Awards and honours ==
- Ferro-Grumley Award for Fiction (for At Swim, Two Boys)
- Lambda Literary Award for Gay Fiction (for At Swim, Two Boys)
