= Davy Byrne's pub =

Pub in Dublin, famous from James Joyce's novel Ulysses

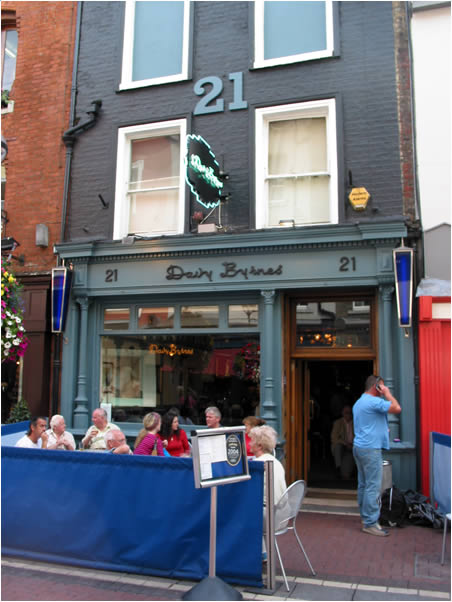
- Exterior view of the pub on Duke Street

- Location within Central Dublin

General information
- Location: 21 Duke Street, Dublin 2, Ireland
- Coordinates: 53°20′31″N 6°15′34″W
- Opened: 1889
- Owner: William Dempsey

Website
- davybyrnes.com

Davy Byrne's pub is a public house located at 21 Duke Street, Dublin. It was made famous by its appearance in James Joyce's 1922 novel Ulysses.

== History ==
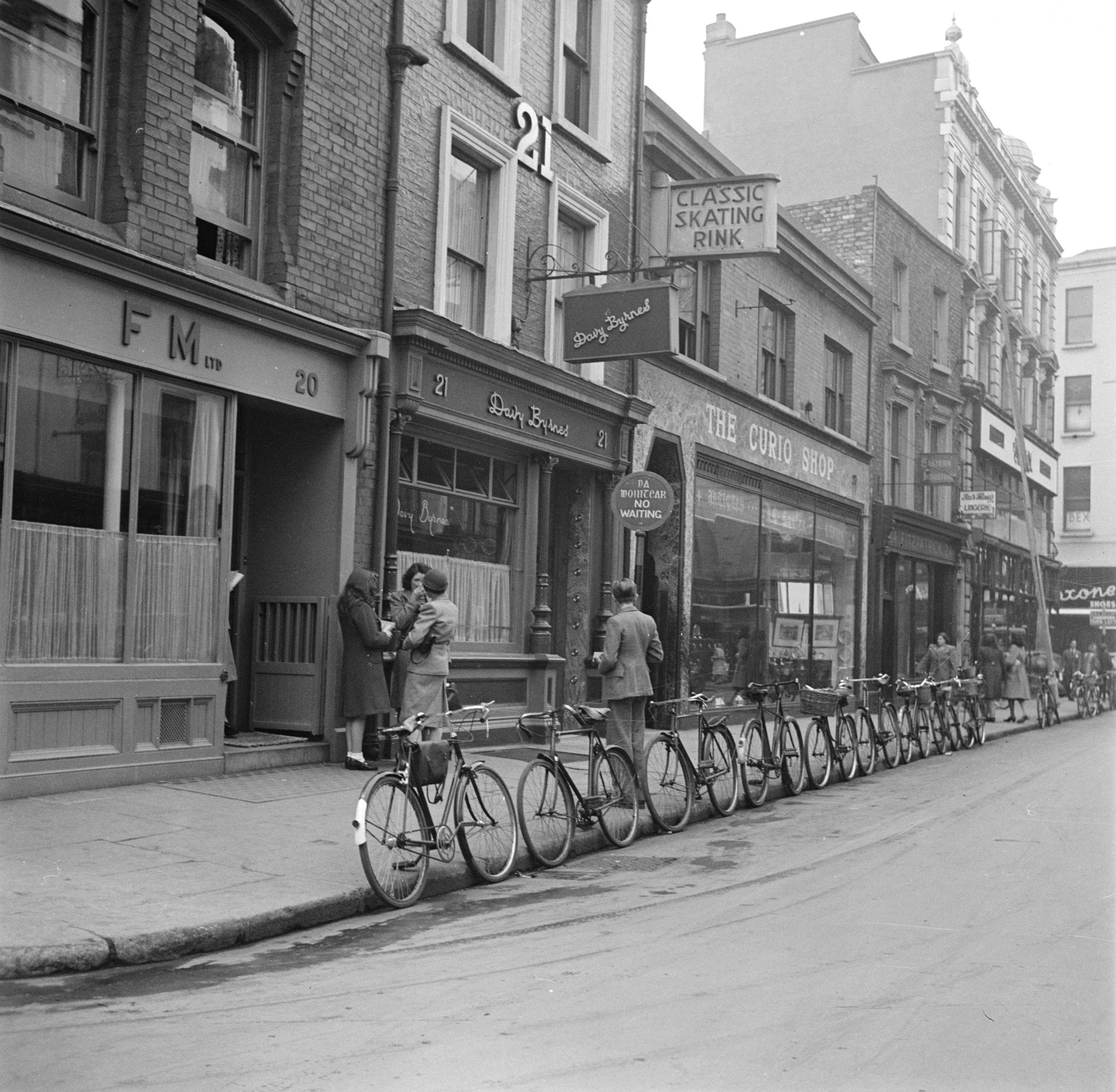
Davy Byrne's Pub in 1946

The pub was originally opened by Davy Byrne, who moved from Wicklow to Dublin, in 1889. He sold the business in 1939.

During the early 1900s, Michael Collins and Arthur Griffith attended cabinet meetings in the rooms upstairs. The pub was substantially refurbished in 1941. The pub was owned by the Doran family for 3 generations from 1942, with Redmond Doran managing the pub in 2001. There is a main bar, back lounge, and "The Arcade" at the back.

Business man, William "Bill" Dempsey, purchased the pub in 2019 from the Doran family for approximately €4.5 million.

== Literary history ==
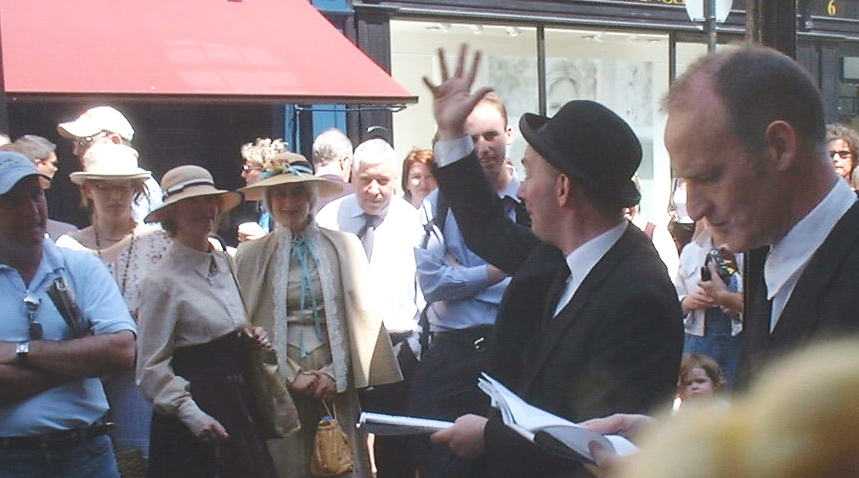
Bloomsday outside Davy Byrne's in 2003

The pub is featured in Chapter 8 ('Lestrygonians') of James Joyce's 1922 modernist novel Ulysses, set on Thursday 16 June 1904. The main character, advertising canvasser Leopold Bloom, stops at just before 2 pm for a gorgonzola cheese sandwich with mustard and a glass of burgundy while wandering through Dublin.

The pub has since become a pilgrimage point for fans of the novel, who, like Bloom, stop and have a cheese sandwich and a glass of wine. The pub is particularly popular on Bloomsday, an annual 16 June celebration of both the book and James Joyce.

Joyce also mentioned the pub in the short story "Counterparts" in Dubliners as a bar visited by the office clerk protagonist named Farrington following an altercation with his senior at the office. It is also mentioned in Green Rushes, a short story collection by Maurice Walsh.

Other literary figures who patronised the pub included Flann O'Brien, Brendan Behan and Pádraic Ó Conaire. Ó Conaire would tether his donkey and cart to the lamp post outside while there.

== See also ==
- List of pubs in Dublin
