= 7 Eccles Street =

Row house in Dublin, Ireland

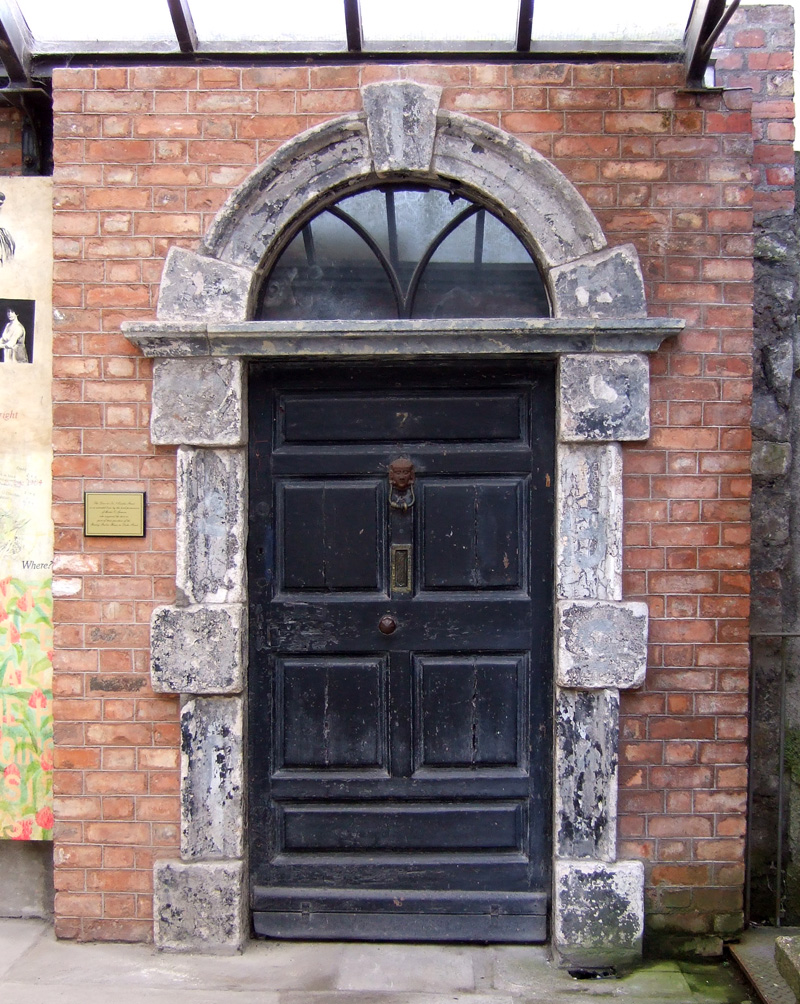
- Entrance to 7 Eccles Street at the James Joyce Centre, Dublin (without the door knocker).

- Location within Dublin

General information
- Status: Demolished
- Type: Row house
- Location: Dublin, Ireland
- Coordinates: 53.357816°N 6.264493°W

Design and construction
- Known for: Home of Leopold Bloom

7 Eccles Street was a row house in Dublin, Ireland. It was the home of Leopold Bloom, protagonist of the novel Ulysses (1922) by James Joyce. The house was demolished in 1967, and the site is now occupied by the Mater Private Hospital.

== History ==
In 1769, Isaac Ambrose Eccles leased a parcel of land on the north side of Eccles Street to Daniel Goodwin, a carpenter. This became the site of numbers 6–8 Eccles Street. John Darley, a stone-cutter, leased the adjoining land, the site of numbers 1–5. The two men seem to have collaborated in building a row of houses, each 20 feet (6.1 m) wide, with three storeys above a basement. Margaret Reed acquired the property at 7 Eccles Street from Goodwin on 29 April 1771, along with Numbers 6 and 8 (the entire premises measuring 60 feet fronting Eccles Street with 200 feet to the rear). (Note: Extract from Registry of Deeds memorial: 271-645-182228. Registered 16/07/1770. A Memorial of an Indented Deed of Mortgage bearing date the fourteenth day of July One thousand and seven hundred and Seventy and made between Daniel Goodwin of the City of Dublin Carpenter of the one part and Margaret Reed of the said City of Dublin Widow of the other part Whereby after Reciting as in said Deed is Recited said Daniel Goodwin for and in Consideration of the Sum of Two hundred pounds to him in hand paid by the said Margaret Reed Did Grant Bargain Sell Transferr Assign Release and Confirm unto the said Margaret Reed her heirs and Assigns All that Lott or piece of Ground on the West side of Drumcondra Lane otherwise Dorset Street in the County of Dublin containing in breadth in front to Drumcondra Lane aforesaid Twenty one feet Six Inches and in breadth from the front to the Stable Lane in the Rere one hundred and fifty feet bounded on the East by another Lott of Ground in Lease to said Daniel Goodwin, and also All that piece or parcell of Ground Situate lying and being on the North Side of a New Street Seventy feet wide lately laid out called Eccles Street in the County of Dublin Containing in breadth in the front to Eccles Street aforesaid Sixty feet and the like number of feet in breadth in the Rere as far as a Stable Lane of twenty five feet wide lately laid out and intended for the use of said premisses and in Depth from front to rere on the East Side Two hundred feet and in Depth from front to rere on the West Side Two hundred and five feet or thereabouts meared and bounded as follows on the North by the said Stable Lane, and on the South by Eccles Street aforesaid and on the West by Ground in the possession of Isaac Ambrose Eccles and on the East by another Lott of Ground of said Isaac Ambrose Eccles's Demised to John Darly To hold said premisses with the appurtenances unto the said Margaret Reed her heirs and Assigns for and during the Lives in said Lease mentioned and the Survivors and Survivor of them and for and during the Natural life and lives of such other person and persons as by Virtue of the Covenants for Renewal in said Leases mentioned shall from time to time Successively and for ever be added to the time and Term of said Leases Subject nevertheless to a provisoe or Condition of Redemption that the same shall be Void on the payment of the Sum of Two hundred pounds with the lawful Interest for the same according to the provisoe therein Contained which said Deed of Mortgage and this Memorial are Witnessed by Edward Fisher of the City of Dublin Attorney and Samuel Reed of the said City of Dublin Plumber.)

From the mid-19th century the wealthier residents of Dublin began to move further from the city centre, and the houses in the area often had multiple occupancy. Before World War I (1914–18) the street was still part of a quiet, respectable middle-class neighbourhood. In 1904, the house was not occupied, so Joyce was able to make it Bloom's home. 7 Eccles Street was designated "Tenements" in Thom's Directory in 1937, indicating a very poor condition. In 1958, the building was occupied by seven very poor families. Flora H. Mitchell painted the house in the 1960s. Anthony Burgess spent three days in February 1965 with a film crew to make part of a BBC television programme on Joyce. The building was abandoned, with holes in the roof and windows at the rear gutted.

The house at 7 Eccles Street, now owned by the Dominican College, was demolished in April 1967. In July 1975 the property and others beside it were sold to the Mater Hospital Pools Society.

== Visit by Joyce ==
Joyce first saw the row of three-storey brick houses when he visited his friend John Francis Byrne at 7 Eccles Street in 1909. Byrne was a friend of Joyce from their college days, a journalist and amateur numerologist. Joyce visited him one day in a very emotional state over a rumour about his partner Nora Barnacle's infidelities. Byrne was able to calm him down and he stayed for dinner and then for the night. Byrne lived at 7 Eccles Street for two years, then emigrated to the United States.

== Novel ==
The novel Ulysses describes one day in the life of advertising salesman Leopold Bloom. On Thursday, 16 June 1904, he makes tea and toast for his wife, Molly, then leaves the house to get a kidney for his own breakfast. He leaves the door ajar, because he had left his latch key in his trousers in the "creaky wardrobe" and does not want to disturb his wife. The novel continues, describing his wandering throughout Dublin, while his wife is being unfaithful. When he retires to bed in 7 Eccles Street that evening he has to remove crumbs of potted meat from the bedclothes, presumably left there by Molly and her lover.

The date the novel was set on is the same as that of Joyce's first sexual encounter with his partner Nora Barnacle.

== Relics ==
Before the house was completely demolished John Ryan, a Dublin artist and writer who had organized the first Bloomsday in 1954, managed to rescue the front door and the surrounding brickwork. He installed it in his pub, the Bailey on Duke Street, a rendezvous for Dublin writers. In 1995 the door was moved to the James Joyce Centre on North Great George's Street. The door knocker had been removed by a visitor from New York just before the house was demolished. In June 2013, he returned to Dublin at the James Joyce Centre's expense and restored the knocker to the door.

== Sources ==
- Gunn, Ian (October 2016), "No 7 Eccles street, The demise of Ithaca", James Joyce Online Notes (11), ISSN 2049-9396
- James Joyce's Ulysses Collection: Photograph of 7 Eccles Street, The Rosenbach, 22 November 2016, archived from the original on 16 July 2019
- McNally, Frank (20 January 2017), "Number Seven's Son – An Irishman's Diary about the cryptographer and friend of Joyce, John Francis Byrne", The Irish Times
- Pierce, David (22 July 2014), Reading Joyce, Routledge, ISBN 978-1-317-86507-0
- Seven Eccles street, The Joyce Project
