= Sandycove and Glasthule railway station =

Railway station in Sandycove, Ireland

Sandycove and Glasthule Cuas an Ghainimh agus Glas Tuathail
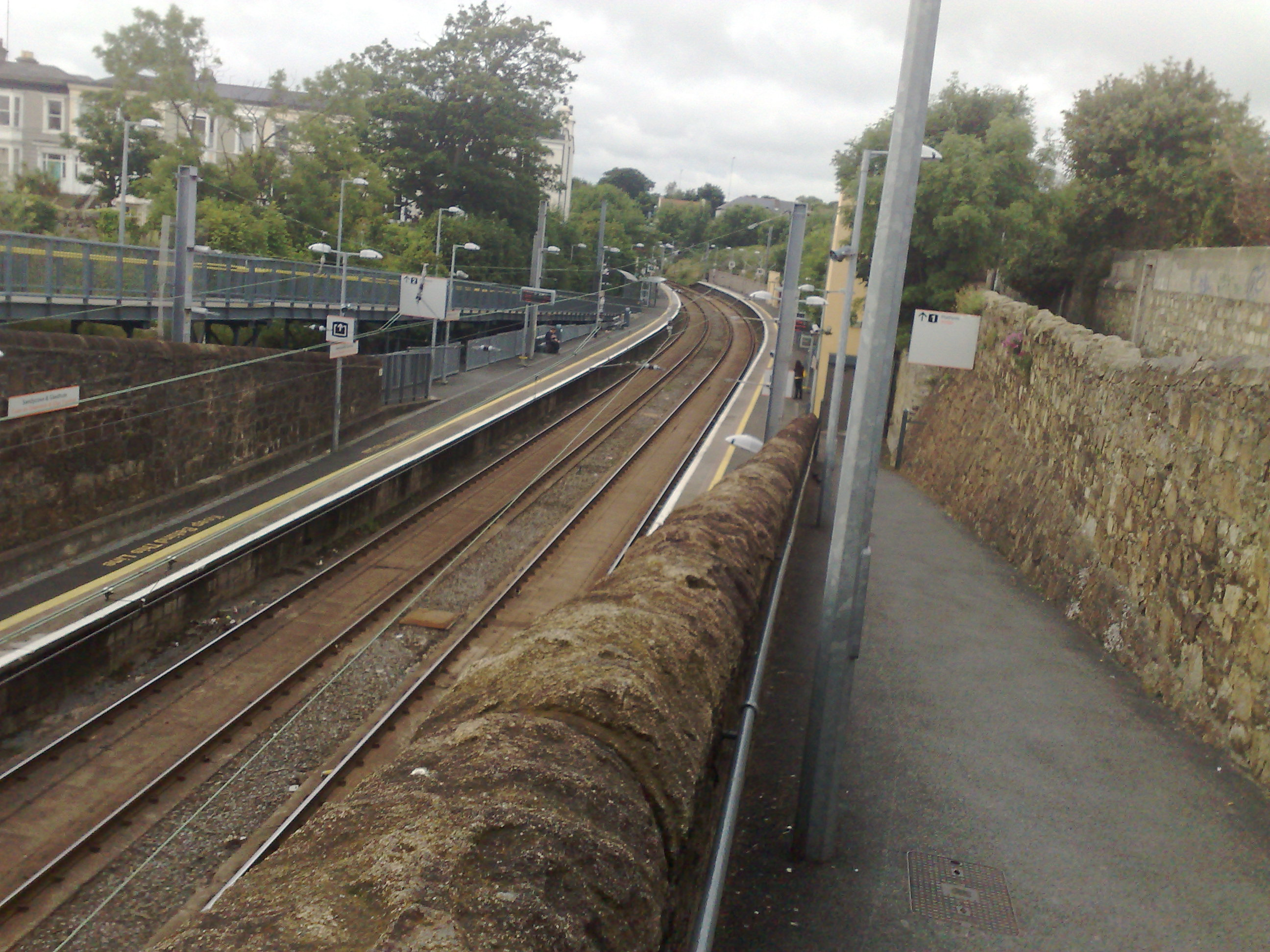
- Sandycove and Glasthule station looking South

General information
- Location: Summerhill Road, Dún Laoghaire; County Dublin, A96 W3V2; Ireland
- Coordinates: 53°17′15″N 6°7′39″W
- Owner: Iarnród Éireann
- Operator: Iarnród Éireann
- Platforms: 2
- Tracks: 2
- Bus operators: Aircoach; Dublin Bus; Go-Ahead Ireland
- Connections: 7D; 7n; 59; 111; 703

Construction
- Structure type: In cutting
- Parking: No
- Accessible: Yes

Other information
- Station code: SCOVE
- Fare zone: Suburban 2

History
- Opened: 11 October 1855 (as Kingstown and Sandycove)
- Electrified: 1984

Key dates
- 1861: Station renamed Sandycove
- 1967: Station renamed Sandycove and Glasthule
- 1983: Station upgraded
- 2008: Station refurbished
Location

Sandycove and Glasthule railway station (Irish: Stáisiún Chuas an Ghainimh agus Glas Tuathail) serves the suburban areas of Sandycove (on the coast) and Glasthule (just inland) in Dún Laoghaire–Rathdown, Ireland.

The building is on a bridge as the rail line is in a cutting. Because of the station's altitude at sea level and the consequent moisture content of the earth, the track at, and surrounding, this station is laid on concrete rather than wooden sleepers.

The information office is open between 05:45-00:15 AM, Monday to Sunday.

== History ==
The station opened on 11 October 1855 as Kingstown & Sandycove, renamed Sandycove in 1861 and Sandycove & Glasthule in 1967. The station was electrified in 1983 with the arrival of DART services.

== Transport services ==
There are bus stops right outside the station on Sandycove Road served by the following:

Dublin Bus Routes:

- 7d - Mountjoy Square to Dalkey, via Dun Laoghaire
- 7N Nitelink from Dublin city centre to Shankill, via Dún Laoghaire (Fri & Sat only)

Go-Ahead Ireland routes:

- 59 - Dún Laoghaire Station to Killiney, via Dalkey
- 111 - Dalkey to Bride's Glen, via Dún Laoghaire Station. This route provides a connection to the Luas Green Line terminus at Brides Glen

Private operator routes:

- Aircoach route 703 from Killiney to Dublin Airport, via Glasthule

A large pay and display car park is located adjacent to the station.

== See also ==
- List of railway stations in Ireland

Preceding station	Iarnród Éireann	Following station
Dún Laoghaire; Mallin	DART	Glenageary
