= Anthony Cronin =

Irish poet, arts activist, writer and barrister (1923–2016)

- Born: 28 December 1923; Enniscorthy, County Wexford, Ireland
- Died: 27 December 2016 (aged 92); Dublin, Ireland
- Education: University College Dublin
- Occupations: Government advisor Poet

Anthony Gerard Richard Cronin (28 December 1923 – 27 December 2016) was an Irish poet, arts activist, biographer, commentator, critic, editor and barrister.

== Early life and family ==
Cronin was born in Enniscorthy, County Wexford on 28 December 1923. After obtaining a B.A. from the National University of Ireland, he entered the King's Inns and was later called to the Bar.

Cronin was married to Thérèse Campbell, from whom he separated in the mid-1980s. She died in 1999. They had two daughters, Iseult and Sarah; Iseult was killed in a road accident in Spain.

In his later years Cronin suffered from failing health, which prevented him from travelling abroad, thus limiting his dealings to local matters. He died on 27 December 2016, one day short of his 93rd birthday, having married a second wife, the writer Anne Haverty; his daughter Sarah also survived him.

== Activism ==
Cronin was known as an arts activist as well as a writer. He was Cultural Adviser to the Taoiseach Charles Haughey (and briefly to Garret FitzGerald). He involved himself in initiatives such as Aosdána (an association for the benefit of artists and writers), the Irish Museum of Modern Art and the Heritage Council. He was a founding member of Aosdána, and was a member of its governing body, the Toscaireacht, for many years; he was elected Saoi (a distinction for exceptional artistic achievement) in 2003. He was also a member of the governing bodies of the Irish Museum of Modern Art and the National Gallery of Ireland, of which he was (for a time) Acting Chairman.

With Flann O'Brien, Patrick Kavanagh and Con Leventhal, Cronin celebrated the first Bloomsday in 1954. He contributed to many television programmes, including Flann O'Brien: Man of Parts (BBC) and Folio (RTÉ).

From 1966 to 1968 Cronin was a visiting lecturer at the University of Montana and from 1968 to 1970 he was a poet in residence at Drake University. Cronin read a selection of his poems for the Irish Poetry Reading Archive in 2015. He had honorary doctorates from several institutions, including Dublin University, the National University of Ireland and the University of Poznan.

== Writing ==
Cronin began his literary career as a contributor to Envoy, A Review of Literature and Art. He was editor of The Bell in the 1950s and literary editor of Time and Tide (London). He wrote a weekly column, "Viewpoint", in The Irish Times from 1974 to 1980. Later he contributed a column on poetry to the Sunday Independent.

His first collection of poems, called simply Poems (Cresset, London), was published in 1958. Several collections followed and his Collected Poems (New Island, Dublin) was published in 2004. The End of the Modern World (New Island, 2016), written over several decades, was his final publication.

Cronin's novel, The Life of Riley, is a satire on bohemian life in Ireland in the mid-20th century, while his memoir Dead as Doornails addresses the same subject.

Cronin knew Samuel Beckett from when they did some work for the BBC during the 1950s and 1960s. Cronin gave a prefatory talk to Patrick Magee's reading of The Unnamable on the BBC Third Programme. Beckett said: "Cronin delivered his discourse … It was all right, not very exciting". Cronin later published a biography of him. Samuel Beckett: The Last Modernist (1996) followed on from No Laughing Matter: The Life and Times of Flann O'Brien (1989).

== Bibliography ==
Verse: main collections

- Poems (London: Cresset, 1958)
- Collected Poems, 1950–73 (Dublin: New Writers Press, 1973)
- Reductionist Poem (Dublin: Raven Arts Press, 1980)
- RMS Titanic (Dublin: Raven Arts Press, 1981)
- 41 Sonnet Poems (Dublin: Raven Arts Press, 1982)
- New and Selected Poems (Dublin: Raven Arts Press, and Manchester: Carcanet, 1982)
- Letters to an Englishman (Dublin: Raven Arts Press, 1985)
- The End of the Modern World (Dublin: Raven Arts Press, 1989 and 1998; reissued in a new expanded edition, Dublin: New Island Books, 2016)
- Relationships (Dublin: New Island Press, 1992)
- Minotaur (Dublin: New Island Books, 1999)
- Collected Poems (Dublin: New Island Press, 2004)
- The Fall (Dublin: New Island Books, 2010)
- Body and Soul (Dublin: New Island Books, 2014)

Novels

- The Life of Riley (New York: Alfred A. Knopf 1964; reissued, Dublin: New Island 2012).
- Identity Papers (Dublin: Co-Op Books, 1980)

Literary Criticism and Commentary

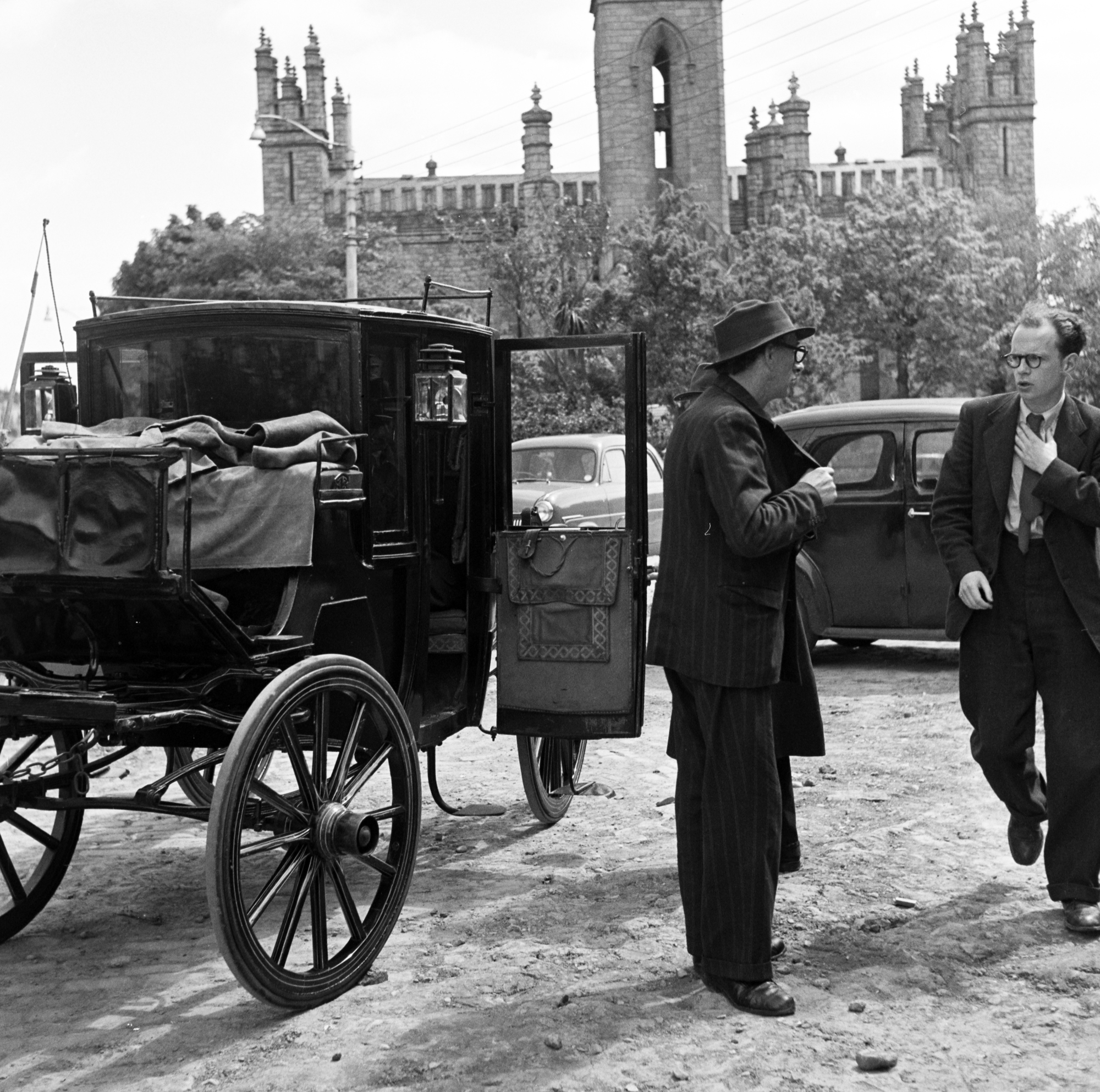
Patrick Kavanagh and Anthony Cronin at the church in Monkstown with the carriage in which they had been proceeding about Dublin in the footsteps of Leopold Bloom, the protagonist in Ulysses, 50 years after Bloom traversed the city in James Joyce's novel.

- Botteghe oscure : quaderno XII, Roma, (De Luca editore, 1953, contributor)
- A Question of Modernity, a collection of critical essays (London: Secker & Warburg, 1966)
- Heritage Now: Irish Literature in the English Language (Dingle: Brandon 1982)
- An Irish Eye (Dingle: Brandon 1985)
- Art for the People?: Letters from the "New Island" (Dublin: Raven Arts Press, 1995)
- Ireland: A Week in the Life of a Nation, text by (Century, 1986)
- An Illustrated Historical Map of Ireland, text by (London: Cassell, 1980)
- Personal Anthology: Selections from his Sunday Independent Feature (Dublin: New Island Books, 2000)

Plays

- The Shame of It, printed in The Dublin Magazine (Autumn 1971), pp. 29–67; performed Peacock 1974.

Memoirs

- Dead as Doornails (Dublin: Dolmen Press, 1976; Oxford University Press, 1983; The Lilliput Press, November 1999)

Biographies

- No Laughing Matter: The Life and Times of Flann O'Brien (London: Grafton Books, 1989; New York: Fromm International, 1998; Dublin: New Island Books, 2003)
- Samuel Beckett: The Last Modernist (London: HarperCollins, 1996)

As Editor

- New Poems, ed. Anthony Cronin, Jon Silkin & Terence Tiller (London: Hutchinson, 1960)
- The Courtship of Phelim O’Toole, Stories by William Carleton (London: New English Library, 1962)

About Cronin

- Where the Poet Has Been, Michael Kane (Irish Museum of Modern Art, 1995): portraits of Anthony Cronin and paintings inspired by his poems, with an essay by Ulick O'Connor
