= Sandycove =

Suburb of Dublin, near Dun Laoghaire, Ireland

Sandycove Cuas an Ghainimh (Irish)
- Suburb
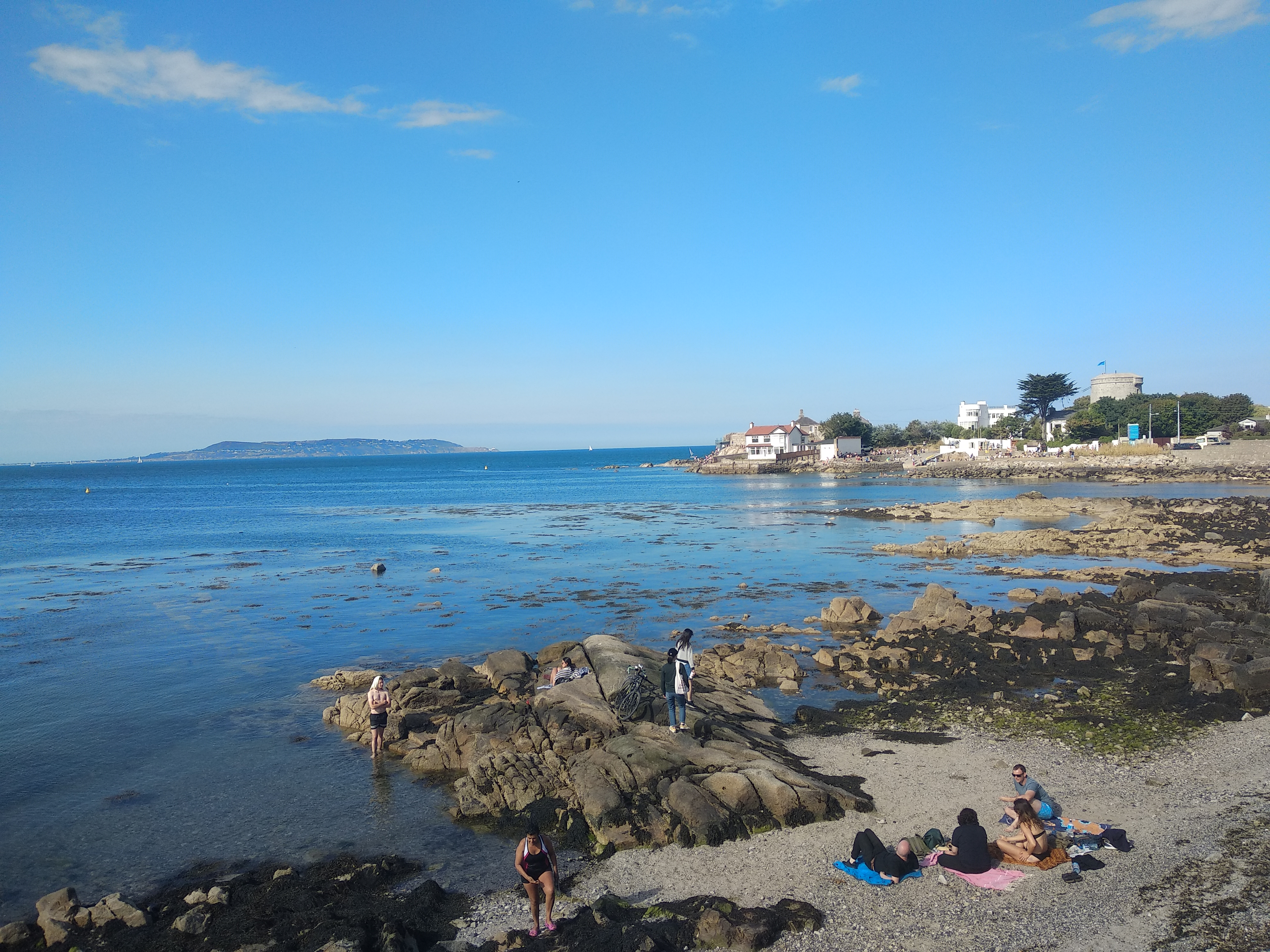
- Sandycove seen from Dun Laoghaire

- Location in Dublin Sandycove (Ireland)
- Coordinates: 53°17′10″N 6°06′58″W
- Country: Ireland
- Province: Leinster
- County: Dún Laoghaire–Rathdown

Population (2006)
  - Urban: 3,735
- Time zone: UTC+0 (WET)
  - Summer (DST): UTC+1 (IST (WEST))
- Eircode (Routing Key): A96
- Area code: 01 (+3531)

Sandycove (Irish: Cuas an Ghainimh) is a suburb of Dublin, Ireland. It is southeast of Dún Laoghaire and Glasthule, and northwest of Dalkey. It is a popular seaside resort and is well known for its bathing place, the Forty Foot, which in the past was reserved for men only but is now available for mixed bathing. The locale features in the opening of Ulysses by James Joyce.

== History ==
On 20 December 1940, during World War II, the Luftwaffe bombed the railway station even though Ireland was a neutral country. There were three injuries.

== Transport ==
Sandycove and Glasthule railway station opened on 11 October 1855. Sandycove is also serviced by Dublin Bus numbers 59 and 111, and lies close to Dún Laoghaire harbour.

== Culture ==
The writer James Joyce lived for a week as a young man in the Martello Tower situated beside the Forty Foot bathing place at Sandycove. The opening scene of Joyce's Ulysses is set in this tower. It now hosts a small Joycean museum, open all year round. Bloomsday is celebrated in Sandycove in Joyce's honour on the 16th of June every year.

Near the tower, on the seafront, is the landmark house designed in the Avant Garde style by Michael Scott, the 20th-century architect, who made it his residence.

The ballad "Sandy Cove" (sic) by composer/singer Jimmy Webb appears on his 1993 album Suspending Disbelief. In the song, the narrator reflects on his life's choices and his mortality as he visits the neighbourhood and the famed Martello Tower.

Singer-songwriter Luka Bloom, in the liner notes to his 1992 album, The Acoustic Motorbike thanks Sandcove Cycles for maintaining the titular bicycle.

== Lifeboat ==
The first lifeboat station in Ireland was established at Sandycove in 1803. On 28 December 1821, the lifeboat rescued the crew of the brig Ellen of Liverpool; four volunteer lifeboatmen drowned.

== Notable residents ==
- Roger Casement was born in Sandycove
- Bernard Farrell, playwright
- Peter Gatenby, Professor and Medical Director for the UN, lived in Sandycove.
- William Monk Gibbon, poet and author
- Oliver St. John Gogarty rented the Martello Tower from 1904 to 1925
- James Joyce stayed briefly in the Martello Tower situated beside the Forty Foot bathing place, as a guest of Oliver St. John Gogarty.
- Lucy Kennedy, broadcaster
- Jason O'Mara was born and raised in Sandycove
- Imogen Stuart, sculptor and Saoi
- Maureen Toal, actress who resided in Sandycove.

== See also ==
- List of towns and villages in Ireland
- Glasthule
