= Bloomsday =

Annual celebration of James Joyce (16 June)

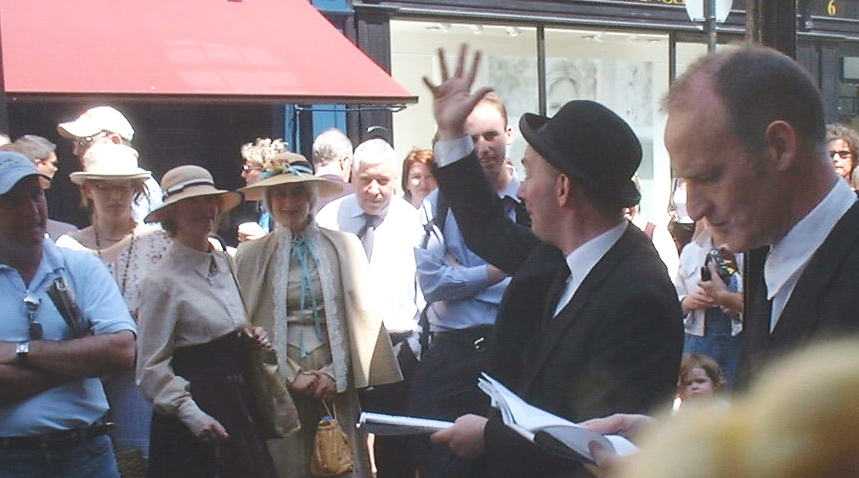
- Bloomsday performers outside Davy Byrne's pub, 2003
- Also called: Bloom's Day (Lá Bloom)
- Observed by: Dubliners and fans of James Joyce worldwide
- Type: Cultural
- Significance: Commemoration of the life of James Joyce
- Celebrations: Bloomsday Festival, wearing Edwardian costume, pub crawls, readings and dramatisations, walking the streets of Dublin
- Date: 16 June
- First time: 16 June 1924; 102 years ago
- Related to: James Joyce, Ulysses (novel), Leopold Bloom, Molly Bloom, Stephen Dedalus, Dublin, Davy Byrne's pub, Sweny's Pharmacy, James Joyce Tower and Museum, Sandycove Shakespeare and Company

Bloomsday (Irish, Lá Bloom), is a commemoration and celebration of the life of Irish writer James Joyce, observed annually in Dublin and elsewhere on 16 June. The day is named after Leopold Bloom, the protagonist of Joyce's 1922 novel Ulysses, the events of which take place on Thursday, 16 June 1904. Joyce chose to set his novel on this date as it was the date of his first sexual encounter with his wife-to-be, Nora Barnacle.

== Name ==
The English compound word Bloomsday is usually used in Irish as well, though some publications call it Lá Bloom (Bloom's Day, in Irish).

== First celebration ==
The first mention of such a celebration is to be found in a letter by Joyce to Miss Weaver of 27 June 1924, which refers to "a group of people who observe what they call Bloom's day – 16 June".

On the 50th anniversary of the events in the novel, a Wednesday in 1954, John Ryan (artist, critic, publican and founder of Envoy magazine) and the novelist Brian O'Nolan organised what was to be a daylong pilgrimage along the Ulysses route. They were joined by Patrick Kavanagh, Anthony Cronin, Tom Joyce (a dentist who, as Joyce's cousin, represented the family interest) and A. J. Leventhal (a lecturer in French at Trinity College Dublin). Ryan had engaged two horse-drawn cabs, of the old-fashioned kind, in which in Ulysses Bloom and his friends drive to Paddy Dignam's funeral. The party were assigned roles from the novel. Cronin stood in for Stephen Dedalus, O'Nolan for his father Simon Dedalus, Ryan for the journalist Martin Cunningham, and Leventhal, being Jewish, was recruited to fill (unknown to him, according to Ryan) the role of Leopold Bloom. They planned to travel round the city through the day, starting at the Martello tower at Sandycove (where the novel begins), visiting in turn the scenes of the novel, ending at night in what had once been the brothel quarter of the city, the area which Joyce had called Nighttown. The pilgrimage was abandoned halfway through, when the weary pilgrims succumbed to inebriation and rancour at the Bailey pub in the city centre, which Ryan then owned, and at which in 1967 he installed the door to 7 Eccles Street (Leopold Bloom's front door), having rescued it from demolition. A Bloomsday record of 1954, informally filmed by Ryan, follows this pilgrimage.

== Activities ==
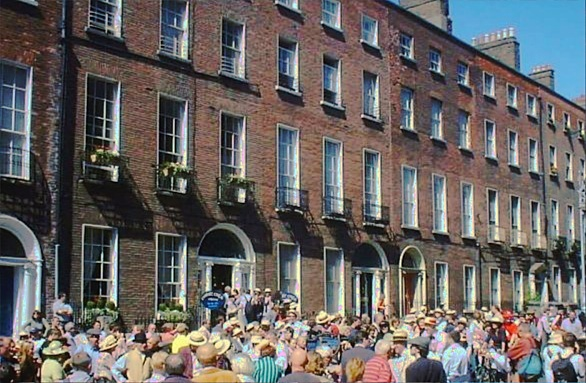
Street party in North Great George's Street, 2004

=== Dublin ===
Since 1994, the Bloomsday Festival has been celebrated in Dublin. The Bloomsday Festival is one-week long and is scheduled on the week of June 16th. The festival involves a range of cultural activities, including Ulysses readings and dramatisations, pub crawls and other events. Enthusiasts often dress in Edwardian costume to celebrate Bloomsday, and retrace Bloom's route around Dublin via landmarks such as Davy Byrne's pub. Hard-core devotees have even been known to hold marathon readings of the entire novel, some lasting up to 36 hours. The Bloomsday Festival is organised by the James Joyce Centre on behalf of the city of Dublin.

The James Joyce Tower and Museum at Sandycove, site of the opening chapter of Ulysses, hosts multiple free activities around Bloomsday including theatrical performances, musical events, tours of the iconic tower and readings from Joyce's masterpiece.

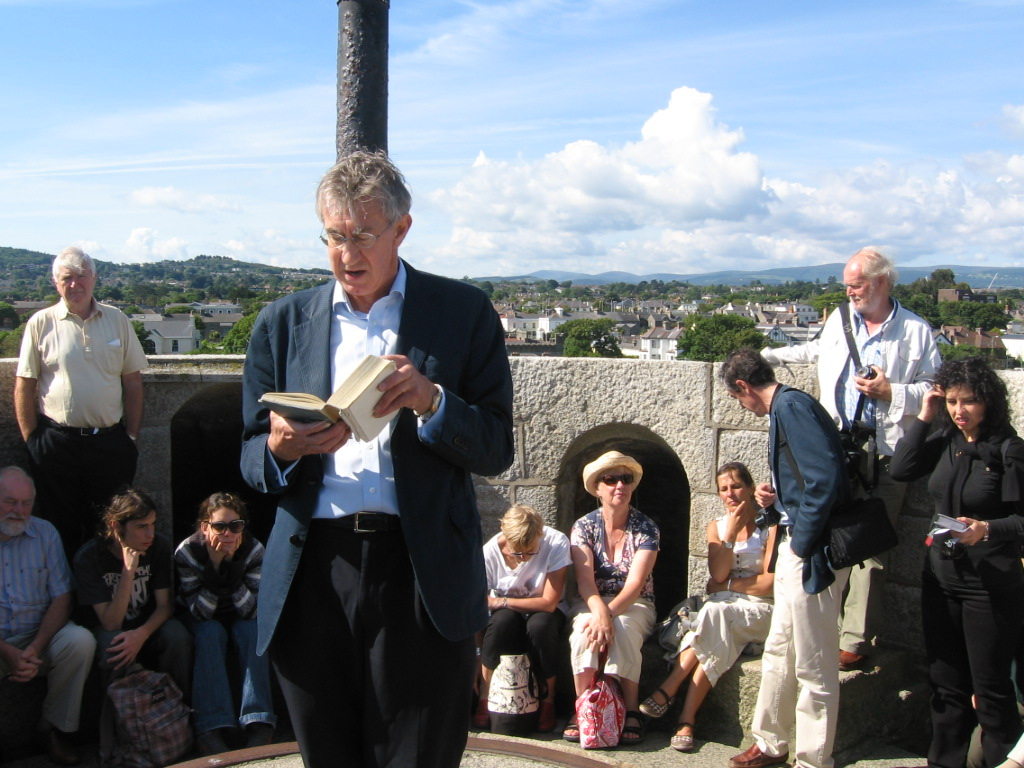
Barry McGovern Reading from Ulysses on top of James Joyce Tower and Museum, 16 June 2009

"Every year hundreds of Dubliners dress as characters from the book ... as if to assert their willingness to become one with the text. It is quite impossible to imagine any other masterpiece of modernism having quite such an effect on the life of a city."

On Bloomsday 1982, the centenary year of Joyce's birth, Irish state broadcaster RTÉ transmitted a continuous 30-hour dramatic performance of the entire text of Ulysses on radio.

A five-month-long festival, ReJoyce Dublin 2004, took place in Dublin between 1 April and 31 August 2004. On the Sunday before the 100th "anniversary" of the fictional events described in the book, 10,000 people in Dublin were treated to a free, open-air, full Irish breakfast on O'Connell Street consisting of sausages, rashers, toast, beans, and black and white puddings.

The 2006 Bloomsday festivities were cancelled, the day coinciding with the funeral of Charles Haughey.

=== United Kingdom ===
BBC Radio Four devoted most of its broadcasting on 16 June 2012, to a dramatisation of Ulysses, with additional comments from critic Mark Lawson talking to Joyce scholars. In the dramatisation, Molly Bloom was played by Niamh Cusack, Leopold Bloom by Henry Goodman, Stephen Daedalus by Andrew Scott, and the Narrator was Stephen Rea.

=== United States ===
Washington, D.C. – The Georgetown Neighborhood Library, located at 3260 R Street, NW, in Washington, D.C. held a marathon dramatic reading of Ulysses beginning 9 June and concluding on 16 June 2014 (Bloomsday). Twenty-five writers, actors, and scholars read Ulysses aloud in its entirety, a project which took more than 33 hours. The reading concluded with opera singer Laura Baxter performing Molly Bloom's soliloquy in its entirety, a feat taking 2 1/2 hours by itself.

Philadelphia – The Rosenbach Museum & Library is home to Joyce's handwritten manuscript of Ulysses. The museum first celebrated Bloomsday in 1992, with readings by actors and scholars at the Borders in Center City Philadelphia. The following June 16th, it began the tradition of closing the 2000-block of Delancey Street for a Bloomsday street festival. In addition to dozens of readers, often including Philadelphia's mayor, singers from the Academy of Vocal Arts perform songs that are integral to the novel's plot. Traditional Irish cuisine is provided by local Irish-themed pubs. In 2014, the Rosenbach's Bloomsday festival went on the road, with two hours of readings at the main branch of the Free Library of Philadelphia, an hour of readings at Rittenhouse Square, and concluded with five hours of readings on the steps of the museum, at 2008–10 Delancey Street.

New York City – New York has several events on Bloomsday including formal readings at Symphony Space and informal readings and music at the downtown Ulysses' Folk House pub. The Irish American Bar Association of New York celebrates Joyce's contribution to the First Amendment, with an annual keynote speech named after John Quinn, the Irish-American lawyer who defended Joyce's New York publishers in their obscenity trial in 1922. In 2014, New York celebrated Bloomsday with "Bloomsday on Broadway," which includes famous actors reading excerpts of the books, and commentators explaining the work between segments. The 2016 celebration includes a juried competition for the Best Dressed Molly and Leopold Bloom, selected from among attendees by a blue-ribbon panel including image strategist Margaret Molloy several design figures.

Los Angeles – Each year Bloomsday is celebrated at the Hammer Museum with readings, music and libations.

Kansas City, Missouri – The Kansas City Irish Center currently hosts the Bloomsday celebration, started at the now closed Bloomsday Books in 1995. Usually a day long event, the center hosts readings, a documentary, a play, Irish dancers and a performance by Dublin balladeer Eddie Delahunt. This has been an annual event since its inception.

Syracuse, New York – The Syracuse James Joyce Club holds an annual Bloomsday celebration at Johnston's BallyBay Pub, at which large portions of the book are either read aloud, or presented as dramatisations by costumed performers.

Wichita, Kansas – Bloomsday is honoured by a presentation on James Joyce (often by Dr. Marguerite Regan) as well as readings from Ulysses and Irish folk music, sponsored by the Wichita Irish Cultural Association.

Portland, Maine – Readings from Ulysses at the Maine Irish Heritage Center, corner of Gray and State Streets.

Tulsa, Oklahoma – The Oklahoma Center for the Humanities, Booksmart Tulsa, and Guthrie Green began an annual Bloomsday Pub Crawl in the Brady Arts District of downtown Tulsa in 2014.

Phoenix, Arizona – the Irish Cultural Center and McClelland Library sponsor a weekend Annual Bloomin' Beerfest with live Irish music, a costume contest, and live readings.

=== Australia ===
In Sydney, Bloomsday is hosted by the John Hume Institute for Global Irish Studies UNSW in association with the National Irish Association Sydney and the Consulate General of Ireland, Sydney.

Bloomsday in Melbourne has a proud history of engagement with the work of James Joyce. Since 1994, a committee of Joyceans – now known as 'Bloomsday in Melbourne' – has read and re-read Joyce and mounted theatrical events designed to communicate the joy of Joyce to its loyal patrons. In 2019 Bloomsday in Melbourne mounted a production of Tom Stoppard's Travesties at fortyfivedownstairs in Melbourne. In 2020, Bloomsday in Melbourne created an online series of eighteen short films, corresponding to each of the episodes of Ulysses. The films featured well-known Australian actor Max Gillies. In 2021, Bloomsday in Melbourne announced that it was to present Love's Bitter Mystery: the year that made James Joyce, as an 'intense immersive theatrical experience' at Melbourne's Villa Alba in Kew, Victoria. The play, written by Bloomsday in Melbourne's Steve Carey, focuses on a key period in the young James Joyce's life, between his first failed exile in Paris in 1902 and his departure for Europe in September 1904.

=== New Zealand ===
Bloomsday commenced in Auckland in the year 2000 with a radio transmission of Ulysses on Access Radio from midnight to 6 am, 16 June – the first Bloomsday celebration of the new millennium anywhere in the world. A cabaret show with Linn Lorkin and the Jews Brothers Band followed next year, 2001, and there has been a Jews Brothers Bloomsday ever since on 16 June, with Brooklyn musician Hershal Herscher as a Woody Allen Bloom and Dublin actor Brian Keagan reading from Ulysses. Currently this three-hour show is hosted by the Thirsty Dog, on Karangahape Road. Guest Molly Blooms have included New Zealanders Robyn Malcolm, Noelle McCarthy, Carmel McGlone, Lucy Lawless, Joe Carolan, Geraldine Brophy and Jennifer Ward-Lealand.

=== Canada ===
A five-day Bloomsday festival has been celebrated in Montreal since 2012 with readings, academic workshops, films, concerts and musical galas, cabarets, walking tours of Irish Montreal, Irish pub events, and guest lectures by internationally known Ulysses experts. Major partners include the Concordia School for Canadian Irish Studies, McGill University Continuing Education, The Jewish Public Library, Westmount and Atwater Libraries.

=== Italy ===
There have been a number of Bloomsday events in Trieste, where the first part of Ulysses was written. The Joyce Museum Trieste, opened on 16 June 2004, collects works by and about James Joyce, including secondary sources, with a special emphasis on his period in Trieste.

Since 2006 Bloomsday has been celebrated every year in Genoa, with a reading of Ulysses in Italian by volunteers (students, actors, teachers, scholars), starting at 0900 and finishing in the early hours of 17 June; the readings take place in 18 different places in the old town centre, one for each episode of the novel, and these places are selected for their resemblance to the original settings. Thus for example "Telemachus" has been read in a medieval tower or on a terrace overlooking the port, "Nestor" in a classroom of the Faculty of Languages, "Proteus" in a bookshop on the waterfront, "Scylla and Charybdis" in the University Library, and "Cyclops" in an old pub. The Genoa Bloomsday is organised by the Faculty of Languages and the International Genoa Poetry Festival.

=== France ===
The Paris Bloomsday Group (of Paris-based Irish Joyceans) performs texts and songs from the work of James Joyce in such Parisian venues as the Irish Embassy, the Centre Culturel Irlandais or the American Library in Paris. Performances are in English with brief forays into French, Italian, Latin and Greek.

=== Czech Republic ===
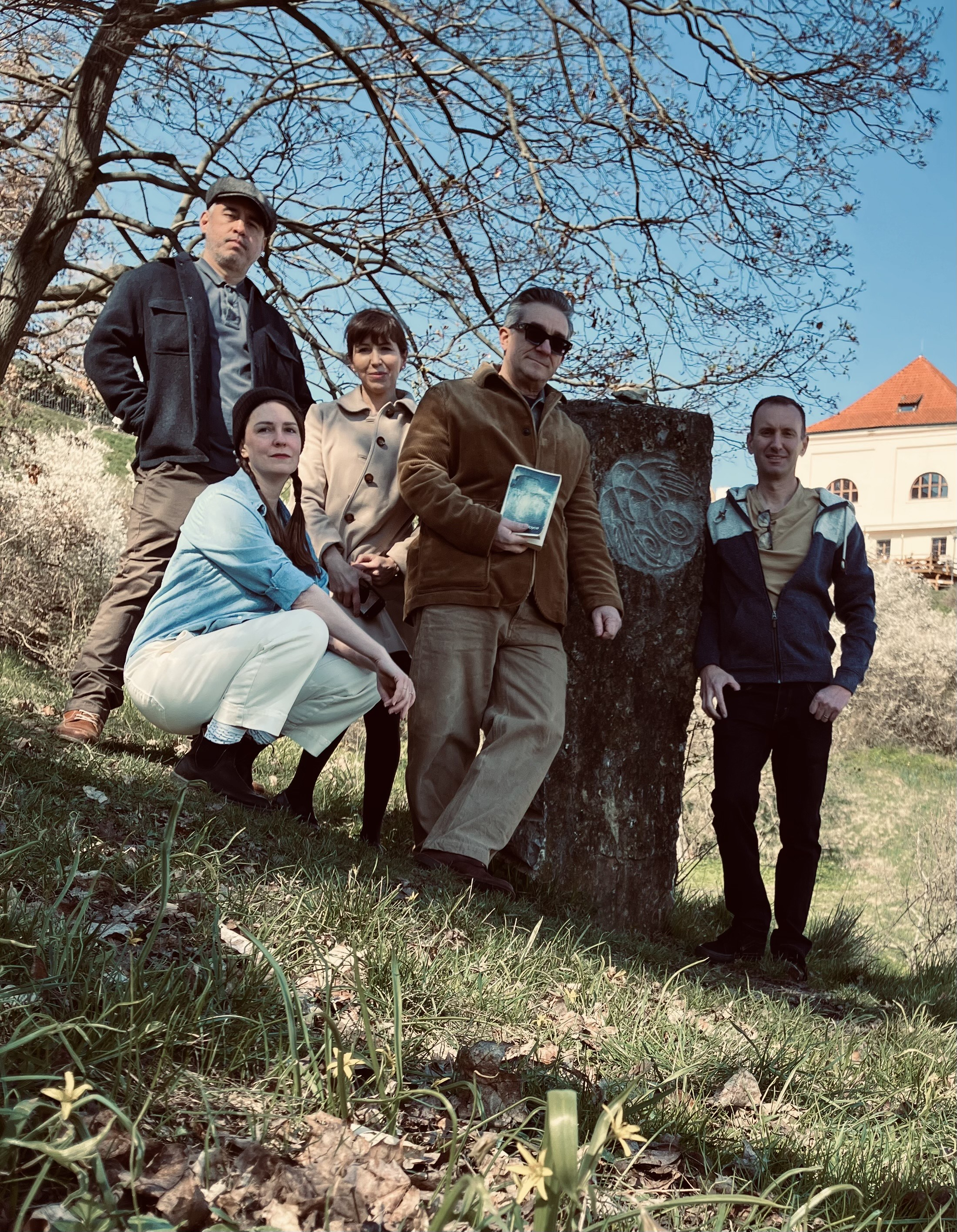
Bloomsday celebration in Prague

Bloomsday has been celebrated annually since 1993 in Prague. Fans of Ulysses meet just below the Strahov Monastery near a large grove containing what is now a frequently dried pond. A large historical protected oak tree (pamatný strom) is at one end of the grove and an unrelated cement monolith on the opposite. People meet every year at 11:50AM. A volunteer reads a section of Aeolus at the noon hour to the pealing of the Strahov monastery's bells.

=== Hungary ===
Bloomsday has also been celebrated since 1994 in the Hungarian town of Szombathely, the fictional birthplace of Leopold Bloom's father, Virág Rudolf, an emigrant Hungarian Jew. The event is usually centred on the Iseum – the remnants of an Isis temple there from Roman times – and the Blum-mansion, commemorated to Joyce since 1997, at 40–41 Fő square, which used to be the property of an actual Jewish family called Blum. Hungarian author László Najmányi in his 2007 novel, The Mystery of the Blum-mansion (A Blum-ház rejtélye) describes the results of his research on the connection between Joyce and the Blum family.

=== Slovakia ===
In 2026, Bloomsday was celebrated in Bratislava. Organised by members of Slovakia's Irish community, it consisted a mix of literary readings and theatrical interpretations of Joyce's writings.

=== Latvia ===
In 2020, during the COVID-19 pandemic obstacles, "Bloomsday Latvia" initiative group organized a limited conference dedicated to the question whether should Ulysses be translated once again into Latvian (the first translation and publication of the book was in 1960). This was followed by a promenade through Riga Old Town where passages from Ulysses were read along the way which ended at the local Irish pub with further talks and Irish dances.

=== Brazil ===
Bloomsday has been celebrated in Brazil since 1967 when the first event took place in São Paulo, a year after it had first been translated into Portuguese by former diplomat Antônio Houaiss. Events have since spread to the cities of Brasilia, Rio de Janeiro, Salvador and Florianópolis. The centenary of Ulysses was celebrated with the issuing of a commemorative stamp in Brazil on Bloomsday 2022.

=== Gibraltar ===
Gibraltar celebrated its 1st Bloomsday in 2025. Gibraltar has a special connection with Ulysses as Molly Bloom is a Gibraltarian (a ‘Llanita’ in local dialect). She was born Marion Tweedy in Gibraltar in 1870, the daughter of an Irish officer, Major Brian Cooper Tweedy, and Lunita Laredo a Gibraltarian Jewess of Spanish origin. Molly grew up in Gibraltar and there are constant references to it in Ulysses. James Joyce never visited Gibraltar, but his characters describe it in accurate detail. There is indeed a Luna Laredo (1864-1897) buried in the Jewish section of Gibraltar’s North Front cemetery. A statue of Molly Bloom can be found in the Alameda Gardens and the Irish pub in La Linea, the neighbouring town in Spain, is called Molly Bloom's. Writer Rebecca Calderon's original one-act play, 'Molly’s a Llanita!' was performed beside the Molly Bloom statue at the Alameda Gardens on Monday 16th June 2025.

=== Spain ===
Bloomsday is celebrated in La Linea de la Concepcion in the Cadiz region. The bull ring is mentioned in Ulysses and Molly Bloom's mother, Lunita Laredo, is from the town. Bloomsday is also celebrated by literary circles in Malaga and Madrid.

=== Global ===
On Bloomsday 2011, @Ulysses was the stage for an experimental day-long tweeting of Ulysses. Starting at 0800 (Dublin time) on Thursday 16 June 2011, the aim was to explore what would happen if Ulysses was recast 140 characters at a time. It was hoped that the event would become the first of a series.

== Literary references ==
In 2004, Vintage Publishers issued Yes I said yes I will yes: A Celebration of James Joyce, Ulysses, and 100 Years of Bloomsday. It is one of the few monographs that details the increasing popularity of Bloomsday. The book's title is the last line of the novel.

In 1956, Ted Hughes and Sylvia Plath were married by special licence of the Archbishop of Canterbury at St George the Martyr Church, Holborn, on 16 June, in honour of Bloomsday.

Pat Conroy's 2009 novel South of Broad has a number of references to Bloomsday. Leopold Bloom King is the narrator. The book's first chapter describes the events of 16 June 1969 in Leo's story.

In the novel by Enrique Vila-Matas Dublinesca (2010), part of the action takes place in Dublin for Bloomsday. The book's main protagonist, Riba, a retired Spanish editor, moves to this city with several writer friends to officiate a "funeral" for the Gutenberg era.

American playwright Steven Dietz's 2015 play, Bloomsday, features an American man returning to Dublin in search of a woman he met on a Ulysses tour years earlier. The play premiered at ACT Theatre in Seattle, WA. It received the 2016 Steinberg New Play Award Citation from the American Theatre Critics Association. It has been widely produced in the United States.

== Popular cultural references ==
=== In film and television ===
In Mel Brooks's 1968 film The Producers, Gene Wilder's character is called Leo Bloom, an homage to Joyce's character. In the 2005 film musical version, in the evening scene at the Bethesda Fountain in Central Park, Leo asks, "When will it be Bloom's day?". However, in the earlier scene in which Bloom first meets Max Bialystock, the office wall calendar shows that the current day is 16 June, indicating that it is, in fact, Bloomsday.

Richard Linklater alludes to Ulysses in two of his films. In 1991's Slacker, a character reads an excerpt from Ulysses after convincing his friends to dump a tent and a typewriter in a river as a response to a prior lover's infidelity. The film also takes place over a 24-hour period. In 1995's Before Sunrise, events take place on 16 June.

A 2009 episode of the cartoon The Simpsons, "In the Name of the Grandfather", featured the family's trip to Dublin and Lisa's reference to Bloomsday.

=== In music ===
Punk band Minutemen have a song on their 1984 Double Nickels on the Dime album entitled "June 16th", which is named after Bloomsday.

The Sensual World/Flower of the Mountain is a song by English singer-songwriter Kate Bush using words taken from Molly Bloom's soliloquy from James Joyce's 1922 novel Ulysses.

U2's 2009 song "Breathe" refers to events taking place on a fictitious 16 June.

Dublin band Fontaines D.C.’s song “Bloomsday” from their 2022 album “Skinty Fia” also references the holiday.

Native American alt-folk musician Samantha Crain released a single named after Bloomsday in 2021.
