= James Joyce Centre =

Museum and cultural centre in Dublin, Ireland

The James Joyce Centre
- Ionad Shéamuis Seoige

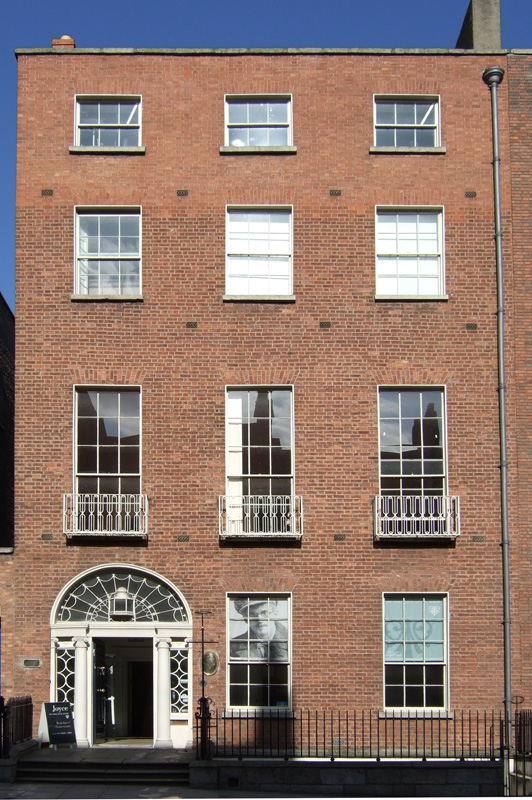

- Location within Central Dublin
- Established: June 1982
- Location: 35 North Great George's Street, Dublin, Ireland
- Coordinates: 53.354174°N 6.260039°W
- Type: Literary museum
- Director: Darina Gallagher
- Public transit access: Parnell Street bus stops, LUAS Parnell stop
- Website: jamesjoyce.ie

The James Joyce Centre is a museum and cultural centre in Dublin, Ireland, dedicated to promoting the life and works of James Joyce and Irish literature, culture and history. It was founded in 1982.

The James Joyce Centre is situated in a restored 18th-century Georgian townhouse at 35 North Great George's Street, dating from a time when north inner city Dublin was at the height of its grandeur. It was built in 1784 for Valentine Browne, 1st Earl of Kenmare. At the end of the 19th century, the ground floor parlour room was used as a dance studio by Denis Maginni, who was featured in Ulysses as "Mr Denis J Maginni, Professor of Dancing &c."

In November 1911, it held the inaugural meeting of the Dublin Vigilance Committee, a group of concerned clergymen and others pledged to “grapple with the terrible traffic of immoral literature carried on in the most public and shameless manner.” During the Irish revolutionary period, the house was used simultaneously by British Army officers for dance gatherings and by Irish republicans as a clandestine meeting place and weapons depot. In 1920, Michael Collins assembled the Squad in the house.

By the 1980s, the house had fallen into disrepair and was going to be demolished by Dublin Corporation. Senator David Norris and the North Great George's Street Preservation Society saved and renovated the building for the purposes of the James Joyce Centre. The building underwent extensive renovations until it was opened to the public in June 1996. During the first ten years of its opening, it was managed by members of the Joyce and Monaghan families, descendants of Joyce's brother Charles Joyce and sister May Monaghan.

The James Joyce Centre's permanent exhibitions include furniture from Paul Leon's apartment in Paris, where Joyce wrote some of Finnegans Wake, and the door to the home of Leopold Bloom and his wife, Molly, at 7 Eccles Street.

Besides its permanent exhibitions, the James Joyce Centre hosts several temporary exhibitions that showcase various aspects of Joyce's life and work. It organises lectures, concerts, theatre, educational courses, film screenings, and walking tours throughout the year, working with artists, writers, and scholars from Dublin and around the world. Since 1994, it has organised the annual Bloomsday Festival in Dublin.

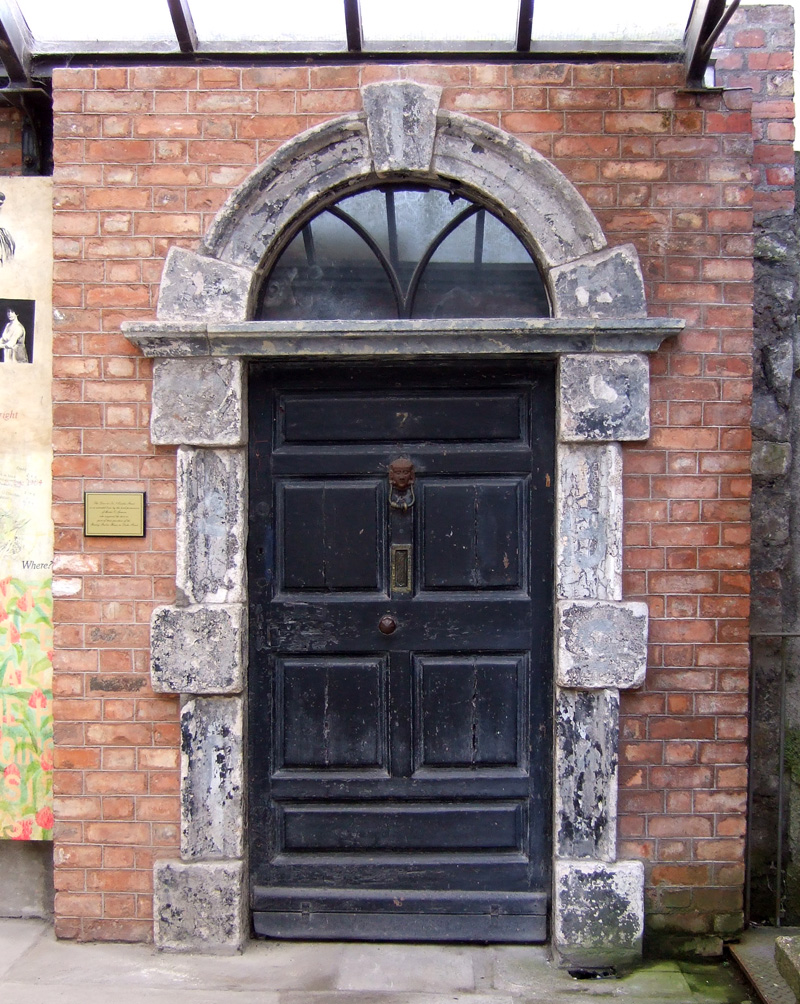
The door of No. 7 Eccles Street
