= Ulysses (1967 film) =

1967 Irish film by Joseph Strick

- DVD cover
- Directed by: Joseph Strick
- Screenplay by: Fred Haines; Joseph Strick
- Based on: Ulysses by James Joyce
- Produced by: Joseph Strick
- Starring: Milo O'Shea; Barbara Jefford; Maurice Roëves; T.P. McKenna; Anna Manahan
- Cinematography: Wolfgang Suschitzky
- Edited by: Reginald Mills
- Music by: Stanley Myers
- Production companies: Laser Film Corporation; Ulysses Film Production
- Distributed by: Continental Distributing (US); British Lion Films (UK)
- Release dates: 14 March 1967 (US); June 1967 (UK)
- Running time: 132 min.
- Countries: Ireland; United Kingdom; United States
- Language: English
- Budget: $900,000 or £222,269
- Box office: $2,300,000 (US/ Canada)

Ulysses is a 1967 drama film based on James Joyce's 1922 novel Ulysses. It concerns the meeting of two Irishmen, Leopold Bloom and Stephen Dedalus, in 1904 Dublin.

Starring Milo O'Shea as Leopold Bloom, Barbara Jefford as Molly Bloom, Maurice Roëves as Stephen Dedalus, and T. P. McKenna as Buck Mulligan, it was adapted by Fred Haines and Joseph Strick and directed by Strick. Haines and Strick shared nomination for the Academy Award for Best Adapted Screenplay.

== Plot ==
The movie follows a day in the life of advertising agent Leopold Bloom and young teacher Stephen Dedalus in Dublin on June 16, 1904, intertwining their stories with the epic tale of Odysseus's wanderings.

== Cast ==
The large number of characters in the novel is reflected in the large cast of the film. The cast, in order of credit:

- Milo O'Shea – Leopold Bloom
- Barbara Jefford – Molly Bloom
- Maurice Roëves – Stephen Dedalus
- T.P. McKenna – Buck Mulligan
- Anna Manahan – Bella Cohen
- Chris Curran – Myles Crawford
- Fionnula Flanagan – Gerty MacDowell
- Geoffrey Golden – The Citizen
- Martin Dempsey – Simon Dedalus
- Edward Golden – Martin Cunningham
- Maire Hastings – Mary Driscoll
- David Kelly – Garrett Deasy
- Graham Lines – Haines
- Desmond Perry – Bantam Lyons
- Rosaleen Linehan – Nurse Callan
- Joe Lynch – Blazes Boylan
- Maureen Potter – Josie Breen
- Maureen Toal – Zoe Higgins
- Frank Bailey
- Jim Bartley – Private Carr
- Colin Bird – Private Compton
- Robert Carlisle Jr – Dr Dixon
- Barry Cassin
- Brendan Cauldwell – Bob Doran
- Mary Cluskey – Mrs Yelverton Barry
- Leon Collins – Vincent Lynch
- Danny Cummins – a drinker in Barney Kiernan's pub
- Brenda Doyle
- Tony Doyle – Lt Stanley G. Gardner
- Meryl Gourley – Mrs Mervyn Talboys
- Don Irwin
- Des Keogh – Joe Hynes
- Eugene Lambert – Punch Costello
- Thomas MacAnna
- Pamela Mant – Kitty Ricketts
- Peter Mayock – Jack Power
- Paulline Melville
- John Molloy – Corny Kelleher
- Claire Mullen – Florry Talbot
- Ruadhan Neeson – Cyril Sargent
- Maire Ni Ghrainne
- Sheila O'Sullivan – May Golding Dedalus
- Jack Plant – Denis Breen
- Derry Power
- Lilian Rapple
- Charlie Roberts
- Paddy Roche – Madden
- Ann Rowan – Mrs Bellingham
- Cecil Sheehan
- Cecil Sheridan – John Henry Menton
- Robert Somerset – Lenehan
- Ritchie Stewart
- O.Z. Whitehead – Alexander J. Dowie
- Biddy White Lennon – Cissy Caffrey

== Production ==
This was the first film adaptation of the novel, 45 years after its publication.

The film was shot on location in Dublin on a modest budget. Although the novel is set in 1904, the film portrays the city as it was in the 1960s.

== Reception ==
Strick earned an Oscar nomination for Best Adapted Screenplay.

The film was entered into the 1967 Cannes Film Festival. It was reportedly jeered at its first screening, but during the second showing, French subtitles in which Molly Bloom described sexual intercourse were seen to have been scrubbed out by a grease pencil, pushing audience sympathies toward Strick who had not been informed of the censorship beforehand. When Strick noticed the deletions during the film's screening, "he stood up and yelled out that this film had been censored", Strick's son David told the Los Angeles Times. "When I went to the projection room to protest, the committee was waiting for me", Joseph Strick later recalled. "I was forcibly ejected, pushed down the steps and suffered a broken foot. I withdrew the film from Cannes."

Reviews from some critics were very positive. Bosley Crowther of The New York Times put the film on his year-end list of the ten best films of 1967, declaring it "A faithful and brilliant screen translation of Joyce's classic novel, done with taste, imagination and cinema artistry." Roger Ebert ranked the film second on his own year-end list (behind only Bonnie and Clyde), writing that it "went into the minds of recognizable human beings and revealed their thoughts about those things most important to them – expressed in the only words they knew." Charles Champlin of the Los Angeles Times wrote that "presuming no familiarity with the novel, the film remains an engrossing experience—very often superbly funny, frequently moving, a confrontation not with three but with more than a score of authentic and credible individuals." Champlin's review concluded, "'Ulysses' is a remarkable achievement, a further chapter in the maturity of film."

Other reviews were negative. The Monthly Film Bulletin wrote that "Joseph Strick's film version is, quite simply, a debasement of the novel. It could not have been otherwise, and Strick must have known this—so why bother in the first place? ... What one misses particularly is a sense of the author's presence, without which the book would be nothing—and without which the film is oddly and insistently impersonal." Pauline Kael described it as "an act of homage in the form of readings ... plus slides." Stanley Kauffmann called it "a facile and ludicrous reduction."

=== Rating and censorship ===
Ulysses was originally rated "X" (adults-only) in the United Kingdom after extensive cuts were demanded by the British Board of Film Classification censor John Trevelyan. However Strick replaced the offending dialogue with a series of screeches and sounds, thus rendering the scenes unintelligible. Eventually the film was released uncut in 1970, and the rating was reduced to (age) "15" for the video release in 1996.

In 1967, the film was banned in Ireland for being "subversive to public morality". The ban was upheld by the Films Appeal Board and placed on the film a second time in 1975. It was screened in the late 1970s at the Irish Film Theatre, a members-only cinema in Dublin exempt from the laws on censorship. The ban was eventually lifted in September 2000 at Strick's request, The first exhibition of the film for the Irish general public was screened in February 2001, with censor Sheamus Smith and director Strick both in attendance. It went on general release at the Irish Film Institute on 8 February 2001.

In New Zealand, the film was originally restricted to adults over 18 in gender-segregated audiences. The rating was reduced to "M" (suitable for mature audiences over 16) in the 1990s.

== See also ==
- James Joyce's Women (1985)
- Cinema of Ireland
