= John Molloy (actor) =

Irish actor and playwright (1929–1999)

- Born: John Richard Molloy; 18 March 1929; Dublin, Ireland
- Died: 2 September 1999 (aged 70); San Francisco, California
- Occupations: actor; mime; playwright; screenwriter
- Notable work: Tolka Row (1964–1969); Ulysses (1967); The Purple Taxi (1977)
- Children: 9, including Honor Molloy

John Richard Molloy (/d͡ʒɒn/; Irish: Eoin Ó Maolmhuaidh; 18 March 1929 – 2 September 1999) was an Irish playwright and character actor, celebrated in The Irish Times as "one of the most versatile actors of the Dublin stage in the 1960s and 1970s."

Molloy was best known for his starring role as Oliver Feeney in the RTÉ series Tolka Row (1964–1969), Ireland's first original primetime drama. He gained further recognition for his work on film, co-starring as Corny Kelleher in Joseph Strick’s Ulysses (1967), an adaptation of the James Joyce novel of the same name. He later found a creative home at the National Theatre of Ireland, where he appeared in over two dozen productions from 1970 to 1980.

Also accomplished dramatist, Molloy's plays and musicals were staged at the Abbey Theatre, the Gate Theatre, the Gaitey Theatre, the Edinburgh Festival Fringe, the San Francisco International Arts Festival, and elsewhere. Additionally, he wrote and starred in the musical revue Double Dublin, which played the Helen Hayes Theater on Broadway from 1963 to 1964. By his own account, throughout his life Molloy authored 40 theatrical revues, two musicals, numerous television and radio plays, and a best-selling memoir, Alive, Alive-O (Dolmen Press, 1975).

== Early life ==
Molloy was born in Dublin, Ireland as the son of a professional comedian. He ran away from home at age 14 to join the "fit-ups," troupes of actors that roamed the countryside performing in small towns and villages. He later spent some years in Paris, France, apprenticing under the famed mime, Marcel Marceau. He left France for a brief stint in the Irish Naval Service, but was discharged after contracting tuberculosis. Molloy spent six years recuperating in various Dublin hospitals, during which time his disability pension subsidized his return to theatre.

== Career ==
=== Stage ===
Upon recovering from tuberculosis, Molloy was discovered by Micheál Mac Liammóir and Hilton Edwards, the founders of the Gate Theatre. From 1955 to 1965 he appeared in numerous Gate productions, including Luigi Pirandello's The Masquerade of Henry IV, John Kelly's The Third Day, and Paddy Cullens' The Dallers. In 1963 Molloy embarked to New York City with his comedy partner Noel Sheridan, co-writing and starring in the musical review Double Dublin at the Helen Hayes Theater on Broadway. In 1969 he appeared in Dominic Roche's adaptation of The Mullingar Recruits by George Farquhar at the Dublin Theatre Festival.

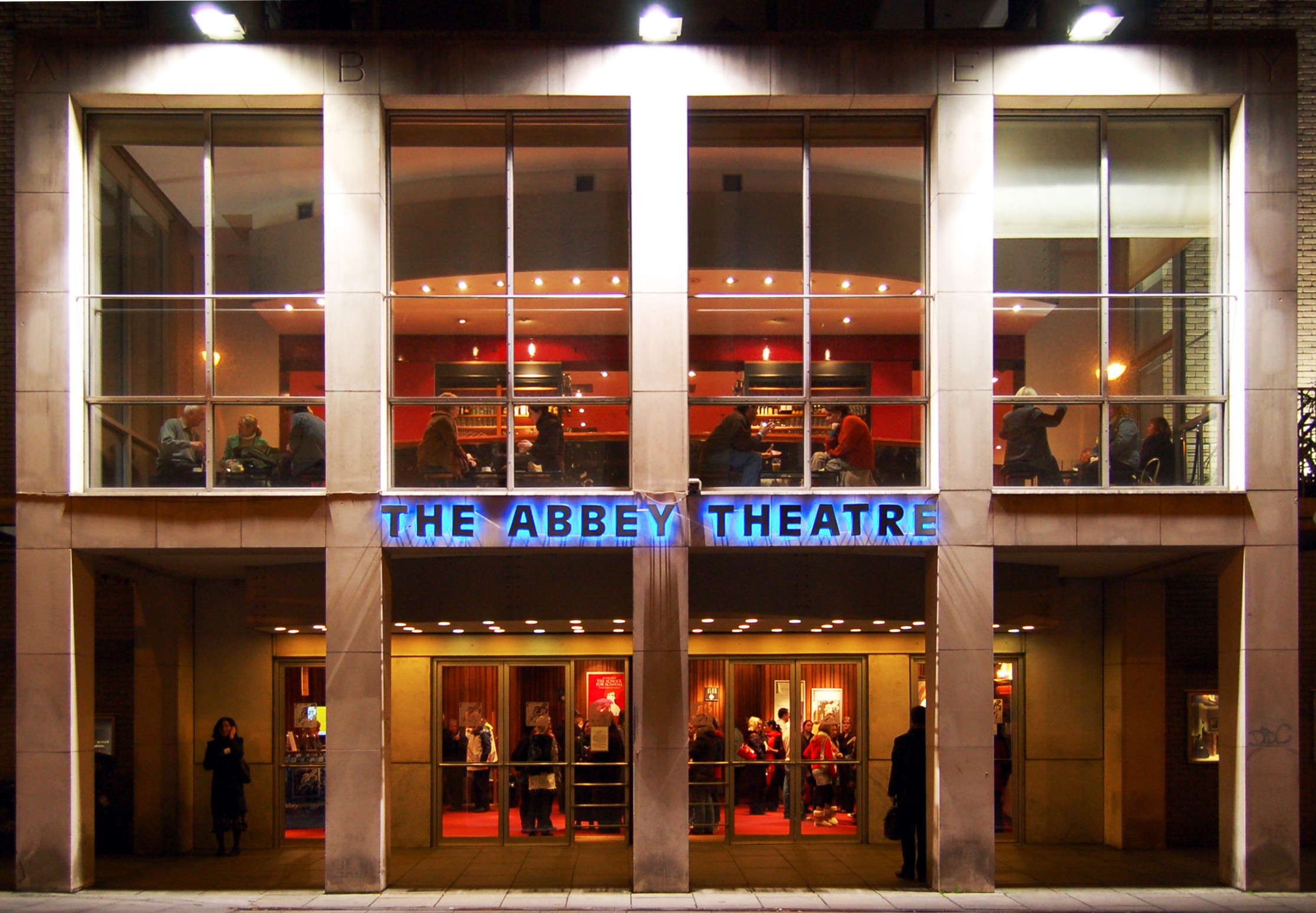
Molloy starred in numerous productions with the Abbey Theatre from 1970 to 1980.

Beginning in 1970, Molloy found a creative home at the Abbey Theatre. During his tenure with the company he specialize in the works of Samuel Beckett, appearing in multiple productions of Waiting for Godot, Act Without Words I, and That Time. Other noteworthy roles from this period included Rev. Paris in the Irish premiere of Arthur Miller’s The Crucible, Porter in Carlo Goldoni’s The Servant of Two Masters, and Fender in Wolf Mankowitz’s The Bespoke Overcoat. He also starred in two of his own plays at the Abbey, From the Vikings to Bang Bang and Molloy, directed by his then wife, Yvonne Voigt Molloy. When later reflecting on this period, Joe Dowling, the Artistic Director of the Abbey, stated

John Molloy was one of the rare genuinely funny men. The things he could do physically were amazing. I remember bringing him into the Abbey on one occasion to teach the actors how to do some of the physical gags for The Servant of Two Masters, and he was so funny that we cast him in the production.

In 1981 Molloy emigrated to the United States, settling in San Francisco. That same year, his one man show Molloy ran for three months at the San Francisco International Arts Festival. The production proved a hit, and Molloy continued to perform the piece in the Bay area throughout the 1980s.

=== Screen ===
Molloy's first film role was in Joseph Losey's 1960 neo-noir film The Criminal. In 1967 he co-starred as Corny Kelleher in Joseph Strick’s film Ulysses, an adaptation of the James Joyce novel of the same name. The film premiered in competition the 20th Cannes Film Festival, where the French subtitles were censored by festival organizers. The film went on to enjoy critical success in Ireland and abroad. Bosley Crowther of The New York Times included the film on his 1967 "Top Ten List," declaring it "A faithful and brilliant screen translation of Joyce's classic novel, done with taste, imagination and cinema artistry." The film was nominated for Best English-Language Foreign Film at the 25th Golden Globe Awards, and Best Screenplay at the 40th Academy Awards.

Molloy next appeared as Slim in J. Lee Thompson's controversial 1970 drama film Country Dance. That same year he appeared opposite Milo O'Shea and Dearbhla Molloy in Daniel Haller's comedy film Paddy. The following year Molloy appeared as Mickster in Academy Award-winning director Ralph Nelson's 1971 British Eastmancolor children's film, Flight of the Doves.

In 1974 Molloy appeared as Mr. Lusty in Stanley Long's British sex comedy On the Game. In 1978 he appeared alongside Judi Dench and Jeremy Irons in Harold Pinter's Langrishe, Go Down, adapted from the Aidan Higgins' novel of the same name for BBC Television. Molloy's final film role would come more than a decade later in 1989 when he starred as Padric Reilly in William Farley's Of Men and Angels. The film tells the story of three strong-willed individuals who struggle for control of their own dreams and each other's. Of Men and Angels premiered in competition at the 1989 Sundance Film Festival. According to his obituary in the San Francisco Chronicle, Molloy appeared in a total of 60 films across the duration of his career.

In addition to his work in film, Molloy had a prolific career on television in Ireland, England, and the United States. From 1964 to 1968 he starred as Oliver Feeney in RTÉ's Tolka Row, Ireland's first original primetime drama. The series ran for five seasons, totaling 155 episodes. Molloy's then wife Yvonne would serve as a writer and director on the series, while his real-life daughter Honor Molloy would appear as his on-screen daughter, Noleen Feeney.

After thr un of Tolka Row, Molloy would go on to make regular guest appearances on numerous primetime series, including Me Mammy (1969), Z-Cars (1971), Play for Today (1972–1979), The Untouchables (1993), and Heartbeat (1999), among numerous others. By the end of his life, Molloy had become a well-known and regarded figure in both Irish and British television.

== Personal life ==
Molloy died on September 2nd, 1999 in San Francisco, California, after a prolonged stay in a psychiatric hospital.

== Acting credits ==
=== Film (selected) ===
Year	Title	Role	Notes
1960	The Criminal	Snipe	
1967	Ulysses	Corny Kelleher	
1970	Country Dance	Slim	
1970	Paddy	Watchbox	
1971	Flight of the Doves	Mickser	
1974	On the Game	Mr. Lusty	
1977	The Purple Taxi	Jack Lynch	
1978	Langrishe, Go Down	1st man on the bus	
1989	Of Men and Angels	Padric Reilly	

=== Television (selected) ===
Year	Title	Role	Notes
1964–1968	Tolka Row	Oliver Feeney	Lead Role: 155 episodes
1969	Me Mammy	Guiney	Episode: "The Day Verilia Went to Pieces"
1971	The Sinners	George Williamson	Episode: "The Highwayman and the Saint"
1971	Z-Cars	Micky Doyle	Episode: "Hold Up: Part 1"
1972	Play for Today	1st ccommittee member	Episode: "Carson Country"
1972	Tales from the Lazy Acre	Drainpipe	Episode: "The Pick-Pocketer"
1973	Once Upon a Time	Peadar	Television film
1975	John Molloy's Dublin	Self/various	Television film
1975	Thursday Play Date	Long John	Episode: "Irish Revel"
1975	Oh Mistress Mine	Caretaker	Television film
1979	Play for Today	Catholic Man	Episode: "Katie: The Year of a Child"
1980	Juno and the Paycock	Needle Nugent	BBC Television
1993	The Untouchables	Guest star	Episode: "Railroaded"
1999	Heartbeat	Derek Preston	Episode: "Full Circle"

=== Stage (selected) ===
Year	Title	Role	Playwright	Venue	Ref.
1955	The Masquerade of Henry IV	Valet	Luigi Pirandello & Micheál Mac Liammóir	Gate Theatre	
1958	Roger Casement	Capt. Von Haughwitz	Alfred Noyes & Roger McHugh	Theatre Royal Waterford	
1958	Roger Casement	Capt. Von Haughwitz	Alfred Noyes & Roger McHugh	Gaiety Theatre, Dublin	
1961	The Third Day	Ned Doyle	John Kelly	Gate Theatre	
1961	The Dallers	Joseph	Paddy Cullen	Gate Theatre	
1961	Glory Be!	John	Fergus Linehan	Gate Theatre	
1963	Once Upon Eternity	Various	William Finnan	Royal Irish Academy of Music	
1963–1964	Double Dublin	Various	John Molloy	Helen Hayes Theater, Broadway	
1965	The Horse Dealer	Patablack Walsh	John Molloy	Gate Theatre	
1969	The Mullingar Recruits	The Constable/Intruder	George Farquhar & Dominic Roche	Dublin Theatre Festival	
1970	Hadrian VII	Cardinals	Peter Luke	Abbey Theatre	
1972	Molloy	Molloy	John Molloy	Peacock Theatre, Dublin	
1976	Waiting for Godot	Estragon	Samuel Beckett	Abbey Theatre	
1976	Time Was	Workmen	Hugh Leonard	Abbey Theatre	
1977	Time Was	Workmen	Hugh Leonard	Abbey Theatre	
1977	Talbot's Box	Matt Talbot	Thomas Kilroy	Peacock Theatre, Dublin	
1977	Talbot's Box	Matt Talbot	Thomas Kilroy	National Tour	
1978	Talbot's Box	Matt Talbot	Thomas Kilroy	Abbey Theatre	
1978	The Crucible	Rev. Parris	Arthur Miller	Abbey Theatre	
1978	The Servant of Two Masters	Porter	Carlo Goldoni & Kenneth and Laura Richards	Abbey Theatre	
1978	That Time	The Listener	Samuel Beckett	Peacock Theatre, Dublin	
1978	Act Without Words I	Man	Samuel Beckett	Peacock Theatre, Dublin	
1978	Faustus Kelly	Cullen	Christopher Marlowe & Flann O'Brien	Peacock Theatre, Dublin	
1979	I Do Not Like Thee, Dr. Fell	Paddy	Bernard Farrell	Abbey Theatre	
1979	I Do Not Like Thee, Dr. Fell	Paddy	Bernard Farrell	Peacock Theatre, Dublin	
1979	From Vikings to Bang Bang	Performer	John Molloy	Peacock Theatre, Dublin	
1979	The Bespoke Overcoat	Fender	Wolf Mankowitz & Nikolai Gogol	Peacock Theatre, Dublin	
1979	I Do Not Like Thee, Dr. Fell	Paddy	Bernard Farrell	Everyman Theatre, Cork	
1980	I Do Not Like Thee, Dr. Fell	Paddy	Bernard Farrell	Abbey Theatre	
1981	Molloy	Molloy	John Molloy	San Francisco International Arts Festival	
