= Amalia Popper =

Italian translator

- Born: 26 August 1891; Trieste, Italy
- Died: 1967 (aged 75–76); Florence, Italy
- Parent(s): Leopold Popper and Letizia Luzzatto

Amalia Popper (Trieste, 26 August 1891 – Florence, 1967) was the first Italian translator of James Joyce's works and author of his first biography, published as an introduction to his translation of Dubliners, published in 1935 in Trieste under the title "Araby".

According to Joyce biographer Richard Ellmann, Amalia Popper is the woman to whom the love poem "Giacomo Joyce" is dedicated, and was one of the sources of inspiration for the character of Molly Bloom in Ulysses.

== Early life ==
Amalia Popper was born in Trieste, the daughter of Leopold Popper, a Bohemian insurer of Jewish origin, and Letizia Luzzatto, a Venetian with a vocation for painting. In 1908-09 she was a private pupil of James Joyce, who taught her English. During this period, the Irish writer established a bond of friendship with the Popper family, frequenting their home even outside the lessons given to his daughters.

She then attended the University of Florence where she met Michele Risolo, her future husband. In 1929 Stannie Joyce asked her to publish a contribution in Erewhon. Thinking of her Jewish roots, she suggested an essay on Zangwill, but Popper preferred to try her luck in translating some of the stories contained in Dubliners: Araby, A cloud, Counterparts, Evelina, The Dead. The translated texts were revised and corrected by Joyce himself and published in the early thirties in the Piccolo di Trieste. In 1935 they were collected in the volume "Araby", accompanied by a brief biography of Joyce authorized by him.

During World War II Popper moved to Florence, where she worked as an English and German teacher. She died in 1967 after a long illness.

== Identification with Molly Bloom ==
Amalia Popper suddenly gained notoriety in 1968 when Joyce biographer Richard Ellmann, based on the words of Stannie Joyce, identified her as the inspirational muse of the poem Giacomo Joyce, written in 1914 and published posthumously. According to Ellmann, Amalia Popper was also one of the models used by Joyce for the character of Molly Bloom in Ulysses., in particular "because of the character and her southern European appearance". Even the name Molly would be a reference to Amalia, whom they used to call at home with the diminutives Malietta, Maliú or Màli. Leopold Bloom would be a reference to Amalia's father, Leopold Popper.

== Bibliography ==
- Carla Carloni Mocavero, La casa de Amalia. Espejo de James Joyce, Ibiskos Editora #Reír, 2007
