= Ofer Samra =

Israeli bodybuilder, actor and painter

- עופר סמרא
- Professional bodybuilder

Personal info
- Born: 20 March 1963 (age 62); Israel

Best statistics
- Height: 5 ft 11 in (180 cm)
- Weight: 208 lb (94 kg)

Professional (Pro) career
- Best win: Mr Israel, before 1984

Ofer Samra (Hebrew: עופר סמרא) is an artist (painter) and actor who has resided in Venice, California. Samra is also active as a film producer, screenwriter and "Fitness and Lifestyle Coach." He was born in Israel in 1963 and moved to the United States in 1986.

== Achievement ==
=== Art exhibitions ===
==== 2014/2015 ====
- QART.Com Gallery
- Flower+Hewes Gallery

==== 2013/2014 ====
- LA Art Show
- Palm Springs Art Show
- Ohr HaTorah Synagogue
- Axiom Gallery/Los Angeles

==== 2012/2013 ====
- Art Basel Miami Beach
- San Francisco International Arts Festival
- Hampton's Art Show

==== 2011 ====
- Soho Gallery, Studio City
- Affordable Art Fair
- LA Art Fair (Lurie Gallery)

=== Fitness and Bodybuilding ===
Year	Competition	Result
1987	Palm Springs Bodybuilding Champion	1st and Overall
1991	Orange County Bodybuilding Classic	3rd Heavy weight
1992	Los Angeles Bodybuilding Champion	2nd Heavyweight
1994	Amateur Grand Prix	2nd Heavyweight
1994	Mr. California	5th Heavyweight

== Filmography ==
Year	Title	Role
2005	Two of a Kind	Ofer
2005	My Name Is...	Jason Scott
2004	Irish Eyes	Italian thug
2004	Envy	Pete
2002	Live from Baghdad	Iraqi Bomb Shelter Guard
2002	Ticker	Minion 1
2001	The Guest of Honor	Gardener
1999	Three Kings	Stunts
1995	Batman Forever	Harvey's Thug
1994	True Lies	Yusef
