= John Molloy =

John Molloy is the name of:

- John Molloy (actor) (1929–1999), Irish playwright and actor
- John Molloy (priest) (died 1922), Archdeacon of Raphoe from 1900
- John Molloy (Australian settler), early settler in Western Australia (1786–1867) husband of Georgiana Molloy
- John Patrick Molloy (1873–1948), Canadian veterinarian and politician
