= Buck Mulligan =

Ulysses character

Malachi Mulligan
- First appearance: Ulysses
- Created by: James Joyce
- Based on: Oliver St. John Gogarty; Antinous of Ithaca; Claudius (Hamlet)

In-universe information
- Nickname: Buck
- Gender: Male
- Occupation: Medical student
- Family: mother, father, sister, "wealthy, pious aunt"
- Nationality: Irish

Malachi Roland St. John "Buck" Mulligan is a fictional character in James Joyce's 1922 novel Ulysses. He appears most prominently in episode 1 ("Telemachus"), and is the subject of the novel's famous first sentence: "Stately, plump Buck Mulligan came from the stairhead, bearing a bowl of lather on which a mirror and a razor lay crossed."

== Characteristics ==
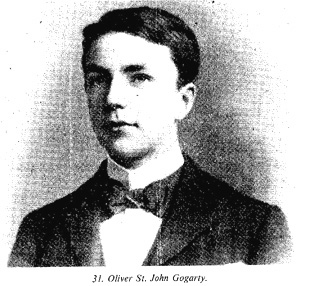
Oliver St. John Gogarty photographed in 1897

=== Physical appearance ===
Buck Mulligan is described as having a "face... equine in its length", a "sullen oval jowl", a "strong wellknit trunk", "light untonsured hair, grained and hued like pale oak", "even white teeth", and "smokeblue mobile eyes." He begins the morning in a yellow dressing-gown; later he dons a distinctive primrose waistcoat and Panama hat. His facial expressions often shift rapidly, and he is prone to sudden, energetic movements.

=== Personality ===
Mulligan is a medical student with a cynical view of the human condition, which he describes as "a mockery and beastly". Paradoxically, he is also the most consistently cheerful character in Ulysses, and is portrayed as being in constant pursuit of the next opportunity to eat, drink, and make merry. He is widely regarded as a hero for having saved men from drowning, and appears to be well liked by all the characters in the book, with the exception of Simon Dedalus (who dismisses him as a "bastard" and a "contaminated bloody doubledyed ruffian") and, to a lesser extent, Leopold Bloom.

Mulligan is an avid classicist and espouses the belief that Ireland ought to be "Hellenized". His speeches contain a barrage of quotations from poets (notably Swinburne and Whitman), popular songs, and self-composed lines of parody and ribaldry. He also seems to admire the philosophy of Nietzsche, referring to himself as a "hyperborean" and (more facetiously) "the Übermensch." He expresses disdain for the Celtic Revival when in the company of Stephen Dedalus, but is socially active in Dublin's literary circles.

Mulligan's finances appear to be at least partially dependent on the generosity of a wealthy, pious aunt; he is also mentioned as having a father who was a "counter-jumper" (i.e. sales clerk), a mother, and a brother.

=== Relationship with Stephen Dedalus ===
Mulligan does not appear as a character in A Portrait of the Artist as a Young Man, but his acquaintance with Stephen Dedalus has been of some substantial duration by the start of Ulysses. The pair share quarters at the Sandycove Martello Tower, whose twelve-pound yearly rent the chronically impecunious Stephen has somehow contrived to pay.

Mulligan's attitude towards Stephen in conversation is both playful and patronising; he alternately teases and compliments Stephen's physical appearance, and refers to him by such epithets as "Kinch" (in evocation of a knife-blade), "Wandering Aengus" (a dual reference to the poetry of W. B. Yeats and to Stephen's demeanor whilst drunk), and "dogsbody". He is frequently generous with Stephen, lending him money and clothing, but also carelessly makes free with Stephen's own possessions and funds, importunities which Stephen seems to accept out of a sense of obligation. Mulligan also injures Stephen with callous remarks about Stephen's late mother and his conduct towards her. Although Stephen's mother has been dead for ten months, Stephen has seemingly never vocalised any grievances to Mulligan concerning these remarks until the opening chapter of Ulysses.

Stephen, meanwhile, has come to regard Mulligan as an antagonist, privately referring to him as "mine enemy." He interprets a request for the Tower key at the end of chapter one as an attempt by Mulligan to "usurp" the Tower from him, and eventually resolves to part company with Mulligan altogether. Stephen also harbours feelings of insecurity about Mulligan's physical courage and fearlessness, traits which Stephen feels that he himself does not possess.

== Role in Ulysses ==
Buck Mulligan is the first character to appear in Ulysses, opening the novel by ascending to the top of the Martello Tower and performing a parody of the Mass with his shaving-bowl. He then calls Stephen Dedalus up to the roof to keep him company while he shaves. During their discussion, it is revealed that Mulligan has recently been to Oxford and has brought back an English friend, Haines, to stay at the Tower. Stephen, who has been wakened in the night by Haines's violent nightmares, threatens to leave the Tower if Haines remains there. Mulligan claims to dislike Haines, but seems reluctant to evict him, as he apparently hopes to wheedle some money out of him before his visit is over. The conversation later turns to the subject of Stephen Dedalus's late mother, and Stephen, after some prodding from his companion, reveals that he has been nursing a year-long grievance against Mulligan, whom he overheard referring to Mrs. Dedalus as "beastly dead" shortly after her death. Mulligan is at first confused, then irritated and embarrassed by this accusation, but quickly recovers his joie de vivre. During breakfast he tries and fails to get Stephen to assist him in borrowing money from Haines, and subsequently arranges to meet Stephen at a pub called The Ship at half past twelve, where he intends to buy them all drinks with Stephen's teaching paycheck. He then asks Stephen to give him the key to the Tower and goes for his morning swim in the Forty Foot.

Mulligan surfaces again in the chapter "Scylla and Charybdis" at the National Library, where Stephen is expounding his theories on Shakespeare. He playfully berates Stephen for failing to meet him at the pub and expresses his suspicion that Leopold Bloom, whom he has seen ogling the buttocks of the classical statues in the adjoining National Museum, is a sodomite with homosexual designs on Stephen. He then waits for Stephen to finish his discussion, interrupting with occasional and largely irrelevant commentary, and composes a playbill for a mock-Shakespearean play entitled Everyman His Own Wife Or, A Honeymoon in the Hand: A National Immorality in Three Orgasms. At the end of the chapter he steers Stephen out of the library for a drink.

Mulligan puts in a brief appearance in "Wandering Rocks", where he meets Haines at a bakery and vocalises the opinion that Stephen Dedalus is insane. He then attends an evening gathering at the home of George Moore, from which he is seen leaving during the rainstorm in "Oxen of the Sun", and joins Stephen, Leopold Bloom and others in the cafeteria of Holles Hospital, where he expounds on an entrepreneurial scheme to offer his personal fertilisation services to willing women and gives an account of Haines's intoxicated behaviour at the soirée he has recently left. At some stage during the medical students' ensuing drunken romp through Dublin, Mulligan meets Haines at Westland Row Station and takes the night train back to Sandycove, leaving Stephen in the lurch.

== Inspiration ==
The character of Buck Mulligan is partly based on Oliver St. John Gogarty, a close companion with whom James Joyce fell out shortly before leaving Ireland. Joyce formed the intention of modelling a character on Gogarty very early in his writing career; an entry on Gogarty in his 1909 Trieste notebook contains a number of phrases that would later be used in Ulysses, and two Stephen Hero-era character sketches feature subjects (called "Goggins" and "Doherty") who closely resemble Mulligan.

Various details of Mulligan's character parallel those of his real-life inspiration. Gogarty was a medical student at the time of his acquaintance with Joyce; he had also made the acquaintance of several classicists at Trinity, had been to Oxford, was known to have saved men from drowning, and was friendly with George Moore. The authorship of one of Mulligan's songs, "The Ballad of Joking Jesus", can be traced to Gogarty. Mulligan's full name, "Malachi Roland St. John Mulligan", contains allusions to Gogarty; in addition to sharing one of the same middle names, their full names have the same metrical arrangement, and "Roland" recalls Gogarty's first name by its popular association with the phrase "a Roland for an Oliver." A 1907 letter from Joyce to his brother stating that "OG's mother is 'beastly dead'" may also indicate that Gogarty, like Mulligan, used this phrase in reference to Joyce's own mother.

Gogarty also resided for a time in the Sandycove Martello Tower; unlike Mulligan, however, he paid the Tower's yearly rent himself. He had originally inquired after renting the Tower with an eye to sharing it with Joyce, who was in need of a place to live while he worked on Stephen Hero, but the plan for cohabitation fell through after the pair quarrelled in August 1904. Joyce, however, did stay at the Tower for six days in September, together with Gogarty and an Oxford friend who became the inspiration for Haines.

Contemporaries of Joyce and Gogarty, on reading Ulysses, differed over the extent to which Buck Mulligan was a fair and accurate portrayal of Oliver Gogarty. Gogarty himself, though he held largely negative views on Joyce's work, once wrote positively of his role in Ulysses: "When [Joyce] paid me the only kind of compliment he ever paid, and that is to mention a person in his writings, he described me shaving on the top of the tower. In fact, I am the only character in all his works who washes, shaves, and swims." Padraic Colum felt that Buck Mulligan, in addition to being an accurate portrait of Gogarty's distinctive speaking style and mannerisms, was in fact "much more alive than Oliver Gogarty in his later years", while Seán Ó Faoláin disagreed, saying that "Joyce did [Gogarty] an immense and cruel injustice in Ulysses by presenting him to posterity as something approaching the nature of an insensitive lout whose only function in life was to offset the exquisite sensitivity and delicacy of Stephen Dedalus."
