= Molly Bloom =

Ulysses character

Marion (Molly) Bloom
- Ulysses character
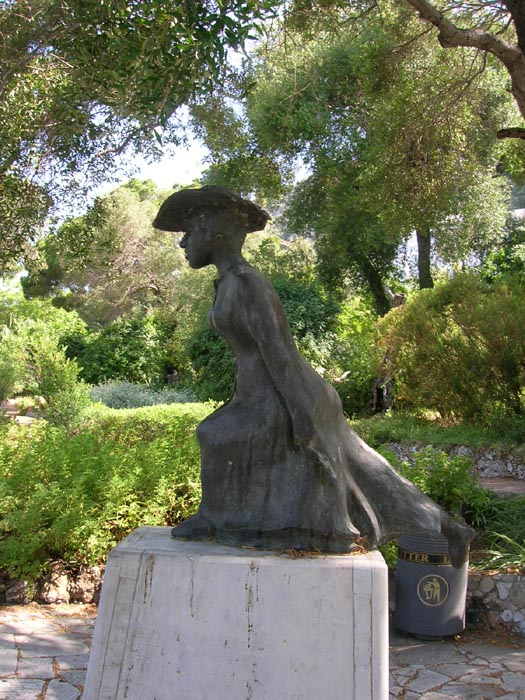
- Molly Bloom's statue in her fictional home in Gibraltar
- Created by: James Joyce
- Based on: Penelope; Nora Barnacle

In-universe information
- Alias: Marion Tweedy
- Nickname: Molly
- Occupation: Singer
- Family: Major Tweedy (father); Lunita Laredo (mother)
- Spouse: Leopold Bloom (m. 1888)
- Children: Millicent (Milly) Bloom (b. 1889); Rudolph (Rudy) Bloom (b. 1893 – d. 1894)
- Nationality: British
- Birthplace: Gibraltar
- Birth date: 8 September 1870

Molly Bloom is a fictional character in the 1922 novel Ulysses by James Joyce. The wife of main character Leopold Bloom, she roughly corresponds to Penelope in the Odyssey. The major difference between Molly and Penelope is that while Penelope is eternally faithful, Molly is not. Molly is having an affair with Hugh 'Blazes' Boylan. Molly, whose given name is Marion, was born in Gibraltar on 8 September 1870, the daughter of Major Tweedy, an Irish military officer, and Lunita Laredo, a Gibraltarian of Spanish descent. Molly and Leopold were married on 8 October 1888. She is the mother of Milly Bloom, who, at the age of 15, has left home to study photography. She is also the mother of Rudy Bloom, who died at the age of 11 days. In Dublin, Molly is an opera singer of some renown.

The final chapter of Ulysses, often called "Molly Bloom's Soliloquy", is a long and almost entirely unpunctuated passage comprising her thoughts as she lies in bed next to Leopold.

== Soliloquy ==
Molly Bloom's soliloquy is the eighteenth and final "episode" of Ulysses, in which Molly's thoughts are presented in contrast to those of the previous narrators, Leopold Bloom and Stephen Dedalus. Molly's physicality is often contrasted with the intellectualism of the male characters, Stephen Dedalus in particular.

Joyce's novel presented the action with numbered "episodes" rather than named chapters. Most critics since Stuart Gilbert, in his James Joyce's Ulysses, have named the episodes and they are often called chapters. The final chapter is referred to as "Penelope", after Molly's mythical counterpart.

In the course of the monologue, Molly accepts Leopold into her bed, frets about his health, and then reminisces about their first meeting and about when she knew she was in love with him. The final words of Molly's reverie, and the final words of the book, are:

I was a Flower of the mountain yes when I put the rose in my hair like the Andalusian girls used or shall I wear a red yes and how he kissed me under the Moorish Wall and I thought well as well him as another and then I asked him with my eyes to ask again yes and then he asked me would I yes to say yes my mountain flower and first I put my arms around him yes and drew him down to me so he could feel my breasts all perfume yes and his heart was going like mad and yes I said yes I will Yes.

Joyce noted in a 1921 letter to Frank Budgen that "The last word (human, all too human) is left to Penelope." The episode both begins and ends with "yes", a word that Joyce described as "the female word" and that he said indicated "acquiescence, self-abandon, relaxation, the end of all resistance." This last, clear "yes" stands in sharp contrast to her unintelligible first spoken line in the fourth chapter of the novel.

Molly's soliloquy consists of eight enormous "sentences", The concluding period following the final words of her reverie is one of only two punctuation marks in the chapter, the periods at the end of the fourth and eighth "sentences". When written this episode contained the longest "sentence" in English literature, 4,391 words expressed by Molly Bloom (it was surpassed in 2001 by Jonathan Coe's The Rotters' Club).

== Sources ==
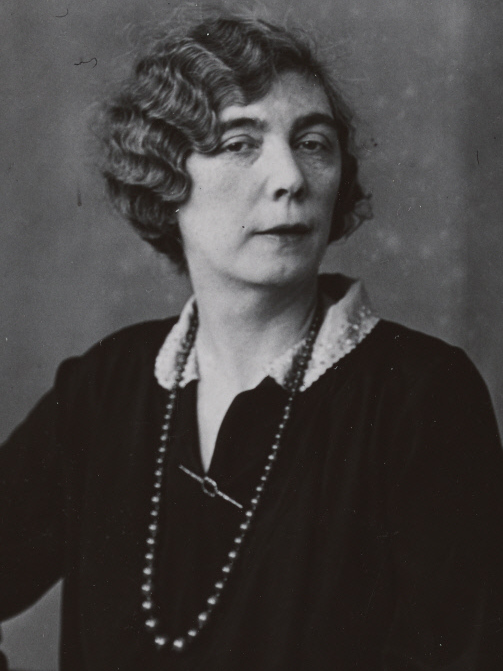
Nora Joyce, photographed in 1926

Joyce modelled the character upon his wife, Nora Barnacle; indeed, the day upon which the novel is set—16 June 1904, now called Bloomsday—is that of their first date. Nora Barnacle's letters also almost entirely lacked capitalization or punctuation; Anthony Burgess said that "sometimes it is hard to distinguish between a chunk of one of Nora's letters and a chunk of Molly's final monologue". Some research also points to another possible model for Molly in Amalia Popper, one of Joyce's students to whom he taught English while living in Trieste. Amalia Popper was the daughter of a Jewish businessman named Leopoldo Popper, who had worked for a European freight forwarding company (Adolf Blum & Popper) founded in 1875 in its headquarters in Hamburg by Adolf Blum, after whom Leopold Bloom was named. In the (now published) manuscript Giacomo Joyce are images and themes Joyce used in Ulysses and A Portrait of the Artist as a Young Man.

== Cultural references ==
=== Literature ===
- J. M. Coetzee's novel Elizabeth Costello portrays the fictional writer Costello as the author of a fictional novel, The House on Eccles Street, which is written from Molly Bloom's point of view.
- Susan Turlish's play Lafferty's Wake features the character Molly Greaney quoting from Molly's monologue.
- Nobel laureate Mo Yan concludes The Republic of Wine with what could be seen as an homage to Molly's soliloquy.

=== Music ===
- Ron McFarland has written a 2-character comic "micro-opera", The Audition of Molly Bloom (1985), which culminates with the soliloquy.
- Kate Bush's song "The Sensual World" echoes Molly Bloom's soliloquy. Bush's 2011 album Director's Cut includes a newer version of the track ("Flower of the Mountain") with new vocals that use the original Joyce text.
- Amber produced a dance song entitled "Yes!".
- "Yes I Said Yes I Will Yes" is the title of a track by Bristol-based jazz quartet Get the Blessing, appearing on their album Bugs in Amber.
- Tom Paxton's album 6 contains a song titled "Molly Bloom".
- The video of "Endless Art" by A House spells out part of the soliloquy letter by letter.

=== Film and television ===
- The soliloquy is featured in a Rodney Dangerfield movie, Back to School, wherein it is read aloud to a college English class by Dr. Diane Turner (played by Sally Kellerman).
- Stephen Colbert's parody of Donald Trump's announcement for his presidential candidacy, entitled "Announcing: an Announcement", recites part of the soliloquy in an otherwise random series of statements.
- The 2017 film Molly's Game contains a character who believes Molly Bloom, the film's poker hostess, is Irish. Molly says, "Okay, Douglas. Focus up. Yes, there's a book by James Joyce called Ulysses and there's a character named Molly Bloom and that is why you think I'm Irish but now it's time to move past that."

=== Art ===
- A bronze sculpture of Molly Bloom stands at the Alameda Gardens in Gibraltar. This running figure was commissioned from Jon Searle to celebrate the bicentenary of the Gibraltar Chronicle in 2001.

=== Other ===
The character Ralph Spoilsport recites the end of the soliloquy, with erratic variations in gender pronouns, as the last lines of the Firesign Theatre's album How Can You Be in Two Places at Once When You're Not Anywhere at All.
