= Dominic Roche =

British actor and playwright (1902–1972)

Dominic Roche (1902–1972), was a British actor and playwright. His 'North country farce' My Wife's Lodger had a West End run in 1950, and was filmed with Roche in the leading role. The BFI Screenonline observed, "Roche's impressively spiky, downbeat script is peppered with dryly effective cynicism."

== Selected filmography ==
- My Wife's Lodger (1952)
- What Every Woman Wants (1954)
- The Quare Fellow (1962)
- Richard the Lionheart (TV series) (1962–1963)
- Paddy (1970)
