= List of Ulysses characters =

Persons in the 1922 novel

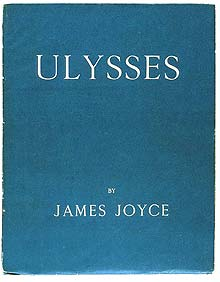
1922 first edition cover of Ulysses

This is a list of characters from Ulysses by James Joyce.

== Principal characters ==
- Leopold Bloom is a protagonist and hero in Joyce's Ulysses. His peregrinations and encounters in Dublin on 16 June 1904 mirror, on a more mundane and intimate scale, those of Ulysses/Odysseus in Homer's epic poem the Odyssey. The character was inspired by James Joyce's close friend, Aron Ettore Schmitz (Italo Svevo), author of Zeno's Conscience.
- Molly Bloom, the wife of main character Leopold Bloom, she roughly corresponds to Penelope in the Odyssey. The major difference between Molly and Penelope is that while Penelope is eternally faithful, Molly is not.
- Stephen Dedalus is James Joyce's literary alter ego, appearing as the protagonist and antihero of his first, semi-autobiographical novel of artistic existence A Portrait of the Artist as a Young Man and an important character in Joyce's Ulysses. Stephen Dedalus appears in Ulysses as the character who corresponds to Telemachus; less overtly, he embodies aspects of Hamlet. He is the protagonist of the first three chapters. Subsequently, Leopold Bloom is introduced, and Stephen's interactions with Bloom and his wife, Molly, form much of the final chapters' substance.

== Other characters ==
- Almidano Artifoni – an opera singer who converses with Stephen Dedalus in Italian in 'Wandering Rocks'.
- Mrs. Yelverton Barry has been described as "one of the fantasized sadistic women of 'Circe'" who accuse Bloom in the courtroom scene of having made sexual advances—in her case, of writing to her claiming to have observed her "peerless globes" in the Theatre Royal, and offered to send her a work of fiction by a Monsieur Paul de Kock. She also features as a character in the play, Ulysses in Nighttown.
- Mrs. Bellingham is one of the fantasized sadistic women of the "Circe" chapter who accuse Bloom in the courtroom scene of having made sexual advances—in her case, of sending her a letter asking her to "commit adultery at the earliest possible opportunity". She also features as a character in the play, Ulysses in Nighttown, and was played by Bernadette McKenna and Maire Ni Ghrainne at the Abbey Theatre.
- Richard Best is a character based on Celtic scholar Richard Irvine Best. Best was an acquaintance of J. M. Synge and Joyce. Best was depicted as one of the characters in the National Library scene in Episode 9 "Scylla and Charybdis". Best was known to have disapproved of Joyce's characterisation of him.
- Milly Bloom is Molly and Leopold's fifteen-year-old daughter, who does not actually appear in Ulysses other than through verbal recollections and letters. The Blooms send Milly to live in Mullingar and learn photography. She is dating Alec Bannon in Mullingar.
- Edy Boardman – a prostitute, and one of the three 'girl friends' encountered on Sandymount Strand in 'Nausicaa'
- Blazes Boylan is the manager for Molly Bloom's upcoming concert in Belfast. Boylan is well known and well liked around town, but comes across as a rather sleazy individual, especially regarding his attitudes toward women. Boylan has become interested in Molly, and they have an affair during the novel.
- Josie Breen is a former love interest of Leopold. He encounters her in Dublin, and then later in the "Nighttown" sequence where Bloom re-lives his affection for her. Josie's husband Denis is something of a laughingstock and is in poor mental health.
- Denis Breen is the husband of Josie Breen and is a figure of fun. A person unknown sent him a postcard with "U.p: up" written on it and he seeks to take a libel action for ten thousand pounds. Leopold states that Josie's marriage to Denis was a case of "beauty and the beast".
- Cissy, Jacky, and Tommy Caffrey: Cissy Caffrey is a friend of Gerty MacDowell and encounters Bloom on Sandymount Strand. She appears again in the "Nighttown" sequence, apparently as a lady of the night. Jacky and Tommy are her two younger brothers who she is minding at Sandymount.
- Nurse Callan is a nurse at the National Maternity Hospital. She is described as a "virgin" and attends to a local woman, Mina Purefoy. She is described as brushing a Dr. O'Hare's coat attentively.
- Private Carr – a British soldier encountered by Bloom and Stephen in 'Circe'
- The Citizen is an old Irish nationalist with xenophobic and antisemitic views who engages in an argument with Leopold in Barney Kiernan's pub, ultimately throwing a biscuit tin at him. "The Citizen" is an important figure in the "Cyclops" episode of the novel. The character has been described as having characteristics not only of the mythological Cyclops but also of the Irish epic figure Finn McCool. "The Citizen" is, in part, a satirical portrait of Irish nationalist (and Gaelic Athletic Association founder) Michael Cusack and Joyce's portrayal operates to expose what one critic called the "xenophobic ideologies of radical Celticists".
- Martha Clifford is a correspondent with Leopold Bloom, who according to some scholars is a pseudonymous identity for over a half a dozen other characters.
- Bella Cohen is the brothel-mistress in the "Nighttown" sequence, and has a large and mannish appearance. She has a son in an Oxford college.
- Private Compton is a British soldier who wanders around Nighttown with Private Carr, eventually encountering Stephen Dedalus. At Compton's urging, Carr eventually assaults Dedalus.
- Father John Conmee, a Jesuit priest.
- Punch Costello is a medical student who we first encounter singing a bawdy song in the National Maternity Hospital. He is told by nurse Quigley to be quiet. He later appears as "Dr" Punch Costello in the medical examination of Leopold Bloom and pronounces, antisemitically, that the "fetor judaicus" is palpable from Bloom.
- Myles Crawford is the Editor of the Evening Telegraph, and refuses to honour an agreement entered into with Leopold Bloom and Alexander Keyes regarding an advertisement for the "House of Keyes".
- Martin Cunningham is a friend of Leopold and accompanies him in the carriage to Paddy Dignam's funeral and thereafter to Kiernan's pub. There he kindly facilitates Bloom's escape from the Citizen, and to visit Dignam's widow.
- Garrett Deasy is the headmaster in the school where Stephen Dedalus teaches and is pompous and opinionated. He writes a self-important letter to the evening newspaper which Dedalus helps get published, on the subject of foot-and-mouth disease.
- Dilly, Katey, Boody, and Maggy Dedalus are sisters of Stephen Dedalus.
- May Golding Dedalus is the mother of Stephen Dedalus. Stephen, a non-believer, refuses to pray at her deathbed and in consequence, thoughts of May haunt him later in the novel. She states, "I was once the beautiful May Golding" (her maiden name). In the 1967 film of Ulysses, the American director Americanizes this as "May Golding Dedalus", an anachronism which does not appear in the book, where European conventions are observed.
- Simon Dedalus is the father of Stephen Dedalus. His character is largely based on Joyce's own father, John Stanislaus Joyce. Simon is a passionate Irish nationalist and supporter of Charles Stewart Parnell, facilitating his financial success within Dublin society in Stephens' earlier years. But with the political "fall from grace" of Parnell, he and his family also fall on hard times. Simon has lost his wife but has continued to maintain an air of respectability within Dublin's "drinking society" where he is known for his wit and singing ability but is unable to provide support for his two daughters. His and Stephen's paths cross several times during the course of the book but the two never meet. Simon briefly mentions concern for Stephen, who is now living on his own and supporting himself, but Stephen feels only the need to escape what remains of his disintegrating family. The novel presents Bloom as Stephen's metaphoric and symbolic father.
- Patrick "Paddy" Dignam – Leopold Bloom attends his funeral from the family home to Glasnevin Cemetery in the chapter Hades. He is survived by Mrs. Dignam and their son Patrick Aloysius "Patsy" Dignam. The Dignams live at number 9, Newbridge Avenue, Sandymount. As he dies in a drunken stupor, he is considered Joyce's analog of Elpenor, who died in similar circumstances and who greeted his friend Odysseus.
- Mrs. Dignam, and Patrick Dignam, Jr.
- Dr. Dixon
- Ben Dollard
- Bob Doran is a drunk in Kiernan's pub and together with The Citizen creates an unpleasant atmosphere for Leopold Bloom ultimately resulting in The Citizen throwing a biscuit tin at Bloom. Doran is one of the main characters in “The Boarding House” in Dubliners, where he is apparently conned into marrying the daughter of the boarding house owner.
- Mary Driscoll is a maid who was fired by Molly Bloom who was jealous of Leopold's interest in her. She appears in both Leopold and Molly's streams of consciousness later in the novel.
- Miss Dunne is Blazes Boylan's secretary
- John Eglinton
- Lieutenant Gardner is a British soldier and a former lover of Molly Bloom and in her soliloquy at the end of the novel, Molly recalls fondling him "to keep him from doing worse". Gardner, who served in the 8th Battalion of the 2nd East Lancashire Regiment, was killed in the Boer War.
- Richie, Sara (Sally), and Walter Goulding
- Haines is an English student who comes to visit Buck Mulligan and Stephen Dedalus in the Martello Tower in Sandymount. Haines is somewhat antisemitic in attitude and is in Ireland to study Irish culture.
- Zoe Higgins is a namesake of Leopold's mother and is a worker in Bella Cohen's brothel. She plays an important role in the "Nighttown" sequence of the novel. She is the first to lure Bloom into the brothel and later steals his potato and dances with Stephen Dedalus.
- John Hooper was an Irish nationalist, journalist, politician and MP in the House of Commons. As a member of the Irish Parliamentary Party he represented South-East Cork from 1885 to 1889. He is mentioned when a matrimonial gift of a stuffed owl given by "alderman Hooper" is described along with a number of items sitting on a mantelpiece.
- Joe Hynes
- Corny Kelleher – an undertaker's employee who rejects Leopold's request for assistance for Stephen Dedalus who was injured in a fight with Private Carr.
- Mina Kennedy and Lydia Douce
- Barney Kiernan is the owner of a public house where Leopold Bloom comes to meet Martin Cunningham, and where he has an altercation with the antisemitic character, The Citizen.
- Ned Lambert a friend of Simon Dedalus from Cork. He attends the funeral in "Hades" and appears in the news paper offices in "Aeolus" and later in St. Mary's Abbey in "Wandering Rocks" and the pub in "Cyclops".
- Lenehan a bowsie (lowlife) and freelance journalist who appears in the "Aeolus", "The Wandering Rocks" "Sirens", "Cyclops", "Oxen of the Sun" and "Circe" episodes and is a central character in Two Gallants chapter of Dubliners.
- Vincent Lynch is a somewhat treacherous friend of Stephen Dedalus, who is present in the National Maternity Hospital in the "Oxen of the Sun" chapter. In "Circe", he is impatient with Dedalus' drunkenness and abandons Dedalus after leaving Bella Cohen's establishment, having helped spend Dedalus' money.
- Bantam Lyons is a Dubliner who misunderstands Leopold Bloom's reference to throwing away a newspaper as being a tip for a horse called Throwaway. He later shares this tip with fellow gamblers.
- Thomas W. Lyster
- Gerty MacDowell is a woman in her early twenties with a limp, who lets Bloom see her undergarments on Sandymount Strand. She appears again in the "Nighttown" sequence as a lady of the night.
- Professor MacHugh an employee at the newspaper. According to Ellmann this is Hugh MacNeil a scholar who used to regularly visit the Evening Telegraph offices.
- Madden is introduced in the novel as a medical student, though he later appears as "Dr." Madden in the medical examination of Leopold Bloom where he states that "In the interest of coming generations I suggest that the parts affected should be preserved in spirits of wine in the national teratological museum".
- John Henry Menton based on the real John Henry Mentin, he is a practising solicitor and attends Paddy Dignam's funeral. He is offhand with Leopold, presumably because of his former love interest in Molly Bloom. Denis Breen attends upon him for advice on a proposed libel action.
- Buck Mulligan – appears most prominently in episode 1 (Telemachus), and is the subject of the novel's famous first sentence: Stately, plump Buck Mulligan came from the stairhead, bearing a bowl of lather on which a mirror and a razor lay crossed.
- City Councillor Nannetti
- J. J. O’Molloy – a local lawyer who is deemed to be having money troubles.
- Jack Power travels with Leopold Bloom to Paddy Dignam's funeral, and gauchely discusses suicide, unaware that Bloom's father has killed himself. He is later present in Barney Kiernan's pub for an altercation between Bloom and The Citizen.
- Kitty Ricketts – a worker in Bella Cohen's brothel. The lover of another character, Lynch, being almost caught in the bushes with him by Father Conmee in Wandering Rocks. She is thin in appearance and dresses with upwardly mobile aspirations.
- George William Russell (A.E.) who wrote with the pseudonym Æ (sometimes written AE or A.E.), was an Irish writer, editor, critic, poet, artistic painter and Irish nationalist. His first book of poems, Homeward: Songs by the Way (1894), established him in what was known as the Irish Literary Revival, where Æ met the young James Joyce in 1902 and introduced him to other Irish literary figures, including William Butler Yeats. He appears as a character in the "Scylla and Charybdis" episode, where he dismisses Stephen's theories on Shakespeare. His collected poems was published in 1913, with a second edition in 1926.
- Cyril Sargent is a pupil of Stephen Dedalus and is an uncertain and mediocre student, reminding Dedalus of his own childhood and uncertainties.
- Florry Talbot is a worker in Bella Cohen's brothel. She plays an important role in the "Nighttown" sequence of the novel and is an overweight presence in the premises. She is concerned about the possible end of the world.
- Mrs. Mervyn Talboys is one of the fantasized sadistic women of "Circe" who accuse Bloom in the courtroom scene of having made sexual advances—in her case, of sending her an obscene postcard and urging her to soil the correspondence "in an unspeakable manner". Talboys announces that she will horsewhip Bloom: "To dare address me! I'll flog him black and blue in the public streets". She also features as a character in the play, Ulysses in Nighttown, having been played by Kathleen Barrington and Maire O'Neill at the Abbey Theatre.
