= My Wife's Lodger =

- Dominic Roche and Diana Dors
- Directed by: Maurice Elvey
- Written by: Stafford Dickens; Dominic Roche (play)
- Produced by: David Dent
- Starring: Dominic Roche; Olive Sloane; Leslie Dwyer; Diana Dors
- Cinematography: Phil Grindrod; Les Harris
- Edited by: Lito Carruthers
- Music by: Francis Essex
- Production company: Advance Films
- Distributed by: Adelphi Films
- Release date: October 1952
- Running time: 80 minutes
- Country: United Kingdom
- Language: English

My Wife's Lodger is a 1952 British comedy film directed by Maurice Elvey and starring Dominic Roche, Olive Sloane and Leslie Dwyer. It was written by Stafford Dickens based on the 1951 play My Wife's Lodger by Roche.

== Plot ==
Willie Higginbotham is a soldier who returns home after the Second World War only to find a spiv lodger has established himself in his place.

== Cast ==
- Dominic Roche as Willie Higginbotham
- Olive Sloane as Maggie Higginbotham
- Leslie Dwyer as Roger the Lodger
- Diana Dors as Eunice Higginbotham
- Alan Sedgwick as Tex
- Vincent Dowling as Norman Higginbotham
- Vi Kaley as mother-in-Law
- Martin Wyldeck as policeman
- David Hannaford as Vernon
- Ilena Sylva as Vernon's mother
- Ronald Adam as doctor
- Wally Patch as Sergeant
- Derek Tansley as deserter
- Alastair Hunter as Lance Corporal
- Toke Townley as soldier
- Fred Griffiths as driver
- Harry Locke as passer-by

== Production ==
Filming took place in May 1952. It was one of a series of low budget comedies Dors made around this time.

== Critical reception ==
The Monthly Film Bulletin said "this comedy runs through a repertoire of farcical situations of the most ancient variety. The playing does not lack energy but the music-hall style jokes – domestic bickering, mothers-in-law and so on – become very exhausting."

Kine Weekly wrote: "Riotous "rough and ready" low life comedy, suggested by the stage success. ... There are no new jokes, but the shrewdly chosen cast makes the most of the evergreen. Wholesome, though occasionally vulgar, it's certain to tickle the crowd."

The Daily Film Renter (quoted in BFI Screenonline) wrote, "the acting is of the 'Ee-bai-goom' school and the dialogue is the ripe, uninhibited language of the music hall... as briny as jellied eels on Southend Pier."

The Radio Times Guide to Films gave the film 2/5 stars, writing: "Few things date quicker than humour and Maurice Elvey's northern farce certainly belongs to another era. ... The humour is broad, the musical interludes dismal, but the cast's enthusiasm is infectious."

In British Sound Films: The Studio Years 1928–1959 David Quinlan rated the film as "mediocre", writing: "Vulgar Northern farce with ancient jokes; enthusiastically played."

TV Guide wrote: "the energy of the ensemble partly makes up for the film's lack of coherence and taste."
