= Maureen Toal =

Irish actress

- Born: 7 September 1930; Fairview, Dublin, Ireland
- Died: 24 August 2012 (aged 81); Dublin, Ireland
- Occupation: Actress

Maureen Toal (7 September 1930 – 24 August 2012) was an Irish stage and television actress whose professional career lasted for more than sixty years.

She was born in 1930 and was originally from Fairview, Dublin. Toal began performing at the Abbey Theatre in Dublin in 1946, when she was just sixteen years old. She became a fixture at the theatre, portraying Bessie Burgess in The Plough and the Stars and the Widow Quinn in The Playboy of the Western World. She also appeared in several one woman shows, including Baglady, which was written by Irish playwright Frank McGuinness.

Another playwright, John B. Keane, wrote the role of Mame Fadden in his play, The Change in Mame Fadden, specifically for Toal. Hugh Leonard also penned characters in his plays A life and Great Big Blonde with the intention of casting Toal in the parts. Toal was best known to Irish television audiences for her role as Teasy McDaid on RTÉ One's Glenroe during the 1990s.

== Honours ==
The University College Dublin awarded Toal an honorary doctorate in literature in 2010.

== Personal life ==
In 1952, she married fellow Irish actor Milo O'Shea; they divorced in 1974

== Death ==
Maureen Toal died in her sleep at her home in Sandycove, Dublin, on 24 August 2012, two weeks before her 82nd birthday. She was survived by her son, Colm O'Shea; two sisters, one brother, and three grandchildren.

== Filmography ==
Year	Title	Role	Notes
1958	Rooney	Kathleen O'Flynn	
1961	Only the Wind	Mrs. Collins	
1962	A Guy Called Caesar	Lena	
1963	Maigret (TV series)	Adele Noirhomme	Episode: - "The Log of the Cap Fagnet"
1964	Fire Crackers	Rosie	2 episodes
1967	Ulysses	Zoe Higgins	
1969	Otley	Landlady	
1970	Paddy	Clair Kearney	
1978	On a Paving Stone Mounted		
1984	Summer Lightning	Dolly St.Leger	
1996	Snakes and Ladders	Rose	

== Partial playography ==
- Bláithín agus an Mac Rí (1953)
- A Slipper for the Moon (1954)
- A Flea in Her Ear (1979)
- A Life (1979)
- Baglady (1985)
- Yerma (1987)
