= The Song of the Cheerful (but slightly Sarcastic) Jesus =

1904 poem by Oliver St. John Gogarty

"The Song of the Cheerful (but slightly Sarcastic) Jesus" is a poem by Oliver St. John Gogarty. It was written around Christmas of 1904 and was later published in modified form as "The Ballad of Joking Jesus" in James Joyce's Ulysses.

== Original text ==
The poem, like many of Oliver St. John Gogarty 's humorous verses, was written for the private amusement of his friends. In the summer of 1905, he sent a copy to James Joyce, then living in Trieste, via their common acquaintance Vincent Cosgrave. Joyce and Gogarty had quarreled the previous autumn, and Cosgrave presented the poem as a peace offering, writing Joyce that "the appended song of J is of course Gogarty's. He bids me send it. He desires you back in Dublin. ... It seems G desires reconciliation so that if you write to me be unequivocal."

I'm the queerest young fellow that ever was heard.
My mother's a Jew; my father's a Bird
With Joseph the Joiner I cannot agree
So 'Here's to Disciples and Calvary.'

If anyone thinks that I amn't divine,
He gets no free drinks when I'm making the wine
But have to drink water and wish it were plain
That I make when the wine becomes water again.

My methods are new and are causing surprise:
To make the blind see I throw dust in their eyes
To signify merely there must be a cod
If the Commons will enter the Kingdom of God

Now you know I don't swim and you know I don't skate
I came down to the ferry one day and was late.
So I walked on the water and all cried, in faith!
For a Jewman it's better than having to bathe.

Whenever I enter in triumph and pass
You will find that my triumph is due to an ass
(And public support is a grand sinecure
When you once get the public to pity the poor.)

Then give up your cabin and ask them for bread
And they'll give you a stone habitation instead
With fine grounds to walk in and raincoat to wear
And the Sheep will be naked before you'll go bare.

The more men are wretched the more you will rule
But thunder out 'Sinner' to each bloody fool;
For the Kingdom of God (that's within you) begins
When you once make a fellow acknowledge he sins.

Rebellion anticipates timely by 'Hope,'
And stories of Judas and Peter the Pope
And you'll find that you'll never be left in the lurch
By children of Sorrows and Mother the Church

Goodbye, now, goodbye, you are sure to be fed
You will come on My Grave when I rise from the Dead
What's bred in the bone cannot fail me to fly
And Olivet's breezy—Goodbye now Goodbye.

== Usage in Ulysses ==
Always on the lookout for engaging quotations, Joyce decided to incorporate Gogarty's poem into his work. An early manuscript fragment loosely connected with Stephen Hero places the first two stanzas in the mouth of Doherty, an early prototype of Buck Mulligan. Joyce later abridged and modified the poem for inclusion in the opening chapter of Ulysses, where it is sung by Mulligan, a character largely modeled on Gogarty.

I'm the queerest young fellow that ever you heard
My mother's a Jew, my father's a bird.
With Joseph the Joiner I cannot agree
So here's to disciples and Calvary.

If anyone thinks that I amn't divine
He'll get no free drinks when I'm making the wine
But have to drink water and wish it were plain
That I make when the wine becomes water again.

Goodbye, now, goodbye! Write down all that I said
And tell Tom, Dick, and Harry I rose from the dead.
What's bred in the bone cannot fail me to fly
And Olivet's breezy... Goodbye, now, goodbye!

An apparition of Edward VII also recites a couplet from one of the unused stanzas ("My methods are new and are causing surprise. To make the blind see I throw dust in their eyes") during the chapter "Circe".

Asked about his authorship of the poem later in life, Gogarty said, "Yes I am guilty; but it shows Joyce's mastery that nobody attributed the verses to me even though he quotes them almost accurately."
