= Milo O'Shea =

Irish actor (1926–2013)

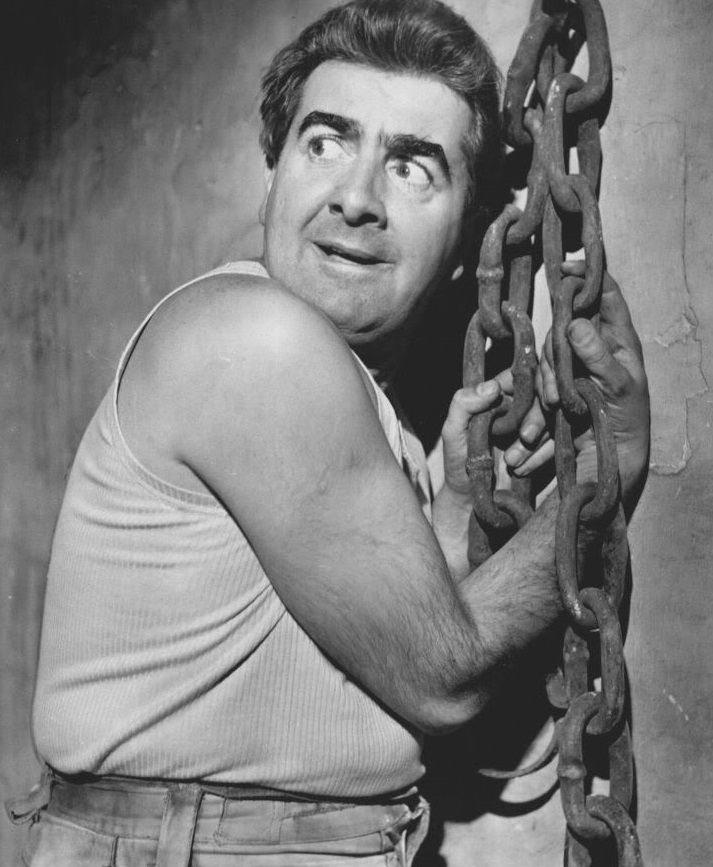
- O'Shea in Ulysses (1967)
- Born: Milo Donal O'Shea; 2 June 1926; Dublin, Ireland
- Died: 2 April 2013 (aged 86); Manhattan, New York, U.S.
- Resting place: Deans Grange Cemetery
- Education: Christian Brothers
- Occupation: Actor
- Years active: 1940–2005
- Spouses: Maureen Toal (m. 1952; div. 1974) Kitty Sullivan (m. 1976)
- Children: 2 sons (with Toal)

Milo Donal O'Shea (2 June 1926 – 2 April 2013) was an Irish actor. He received nomination for the BAFTA Award for Most Promising Newcomer for his breakthrough role of Leopold Bloom in Ulysses (1967), and was twice nominated for the Tony Award for Best Lead Actor in a Play for his performances in Broadway productions of Staircase (1968) and Mass Appeal (1982).

== Early life and education ==
O'Shea was born and brought up in Dublin and educated by the Christian Brothers at Synge Street school, along with his friend Donal Donnelly. His father was a singer and his mother a ballet teacher. Because he was bilingual, O'Shea performed in English-speaking theatres and in Irish in the Abbey Theatre Company. At age 12, he appeared in George Bernard Shaw's Caesar and Cleopatra at the Gate Theatre. He later studied music and drama at the Guildhall School in London and was a skilled pianist.

He was discovered in the 1950s by Harry Dillon, who ran the 37 Theatre Club on the top floor of his shop the Swiss Gem Company, 51 Lower O'Connell Street Dublin. Early in his career O'Shea toured with the theatrical company of Anew McMaster.

== Career ==
O'Shea began acting on the stage, then moved into film in the 1960s. He became popular in the United Kingdom, as a result of starring in the BBC sitcom Me Mammy alongside Yootha Joyce. In 1967–68 he appeared in the drama Staircase, co-starring Eli Wallach and directed by Barry Morse, which stands as Broadway's first depiction of homosexual men in a serious light. For his role in that drama, he was nominated for the Tony Award for Best Actor in a Play in 1968.

O'Shea starred as Leopold Bloom in Joseph Strick's 1967 film version of Ulysses. Among his other memorable film roles in the 1960s were the well-intentioned Friar Laurence in Franco Zeffirelli's Romeo and Juliet and the villainous Dr. Durand Durand (who tried to kill Jane Fonda's character by making her die of pleasure) in Roger Vadim's counterculture classic Barbarella (both films were released in 1968). In 1984, O'Shea reprised his role as Dr. Durand Durand (credited as Dr. Duran Duran) for the 1985 Duran Duran concert film Arena (An Absurd Notion), since his character inspired the band's name. He played Inspector Boot in the 1973 Vincent Price horror/comedy film Theatre of Blood.

He was active in American films and television, such as his memorable supporting role as the trial judge in the Sidney Lumet-directed movie The Verdict (1982) with Paul Newman, an episode of The Golden Girls in 1987, and portraying Chief Justice of the United States Roy Ashland in the television series The West Wing. In 1992, O'Shea guest starred in the season 10 finale of the sitcom Cheers and in 1995, in an episode of the show's spin-off Frasier. In the episode of Frasier, he played Dr. Schachter, a couple's therapist who counsels the Crane brothers together. He appeared in the pilot episode of Early Edition as Sherman.

Other stage appearances include Mass Appeal (1981) in which he originated the role of Father Tim Farley (for which he was nominated for the Tony Award for Best Actor in a Play in 1982), the musical Dear World in which he played the Sewer Man opposite Angela Lansbury as Countess Aurelia, Corpse! (1986) and a 1994 Broadway revival of Philadelphia, Here I Come.

O'Shea received an honorary degree from Quinnipiac University in 2010.

== Personal life ==
O'Shea's first wife was Maureen Toal, an Irish actress, with whom he had two sons. He divorced her in 1974.

He was married to the Irish actress Kitty Sullivan, whom he met in Italy, where he was filming Barbarella and she was auditioning for Man of La Mancha. The couple occasionally acted together, such as in a 1981 Broadway revival of My Fair Lady. O'Shea and Sullivan had no children together. They both adopted United States citizenship and resided in New York City, where they both lived from 1976.

=== Death ===
O'Shea died on 2 April 2013, in New York City following a short illness at the age of 86.

== Acting credits ==
=== Film ===
Year	Title	Role	Notes
1940	Contraband	Air Raid Warden	Uncredited
1946	Great Expectations	Condemned criminal	Uncredited
1950	Talk of a Million	Signwriter	
1958	Never Love a Stranger	Off-Screen Narrator	Uncredited
1959	This Other Eden	Pat Tweedy	
1962	Mrs. Gibbons' Boys	Horse	
1963	Carry On Cabby	Len	
1964	Never Put It in Writing	Danny O'Toole	
1967	Ulysses	Leopold Bloom	
1968	Romeo and Juliet	Friar Laurence	
1968	Barbarella	Concierge / Durand-Durand	
1968	Journey into Darkness	Matt Dystal	(episode 'The New People')
1969	The Adding Machine	Mr. Zero	
1970	Paddy	Harry Redmond	
1970	The Angel Levine	Dr. Arnold Berg	
1970	Loot	Mr. McLeavy	
1971	Sacco & Vanzetti	Fred Moore	
1973	The Love Ban	Father Andrew	
1973	Theatre of Blood	Inspector Boot	
1973	Steptoe and Son Ride Again	Doctor Popplewell	
1973	Digby, the Biggest Dog in the World	Dr. Jameson	
1974	Professor Popper's Problem	Dr. Klein	
1974	Percy's Progress	Professor Crabbit	
1979	Arabian Adventure	Khasim	
1980	The Pilot	Doctor O'Brian	
1982	The Verdict	Judge Hoyle	
1985	The Purple Rose of Cairo	Father Donnelly	
1989	The Dream Team	Dr. Newald	
1990	Opportunity Knocks	Max	
1991	Only the Lonely	Doyle	
1992	The Playboys	Freddie	
1997	The Butcher Boy	Father Sullivan	
1997	The Matchmaker	Dermot O'Brien	
2000	Moonglow	Peter Brener	
2002	Puckoon	Sgt. McGillikuddie	
2003	Mystics	Locky	

=== Television ===
Year	Title	Role	Notes
1951	The Passing Show	Performer	Episode: "The Years of Change"
1957–1958	Armchair Theatre	Performer	2 episodes
1958	Theatre Night	Shawn Keogh	Episode: "The Hearts a Wonderer"
1960	ITV Television Playhouse	Performer	3 episodes
1960	On Trial	Charles Armstrong	Episode: "W.T. Stead"
1961	The Play of the Week	Presenter	Episode: "Waiting for Godot"
1961	No Hiding Place	Perkins	Episode: "Mr. and Mrs. Smith"
1962	Out of This World	Jacob Luke	Episode: "Pictures Don't Lie"
1962	Z-Cars	Caxton / Chauncey	2 episodes
1963	Maupassant	Brument	Episode: "Women and Money"
1963	First Night	Benjy Spillane	Episode: "My One True Love"
1964	Festival	Leopold Bloom	Episode: "Bloomsday"
1960–1965	ITV Play of the Week	Performer	4 episodes
1965	Drama 61-67	Sam Quilly	Episode: "Drama '65: Mrs Quilley's Murder Shoes"
1965	Theatre 625	Mulligan	Episode: "Portrait of the North"
1966	The Wednesday Play	Brother Arnold	Episode: "Silent Song"
1966	Pardon the Expression	Uncle Mike	Episode: "Heads Down"
1966	Thirty-Minute Theatre	Fred	Episode: "Friday Night's the Best Night"
1967	Uncle Charles	Renzo Phillipe	Episode: "Mrs. Phillipe is Hurt"
1968	Journey to the Unknown	Matt Dystal	Episode: "The New People"
1965–1969	Out of the Unknown	Monty/Henry	2 episodes
1969	Galton and Simpson Comedy	Alec Hemphill	Episode: "Pity Poor Edie"
1970	On the House	Mr. McGonigle	"The Great McGonigle"
1970	The Glorious Uncertainty	Sam Price	TV movie
1968–1971	Me Mammy	Bunjy Kennefick	21 episodes
1971	Jackanory	Storyteller	5 episodes
1971	Andorra	The Teacher	TV movie
1972	Tales from the Lazy Acre	Various roles	7 episodes
1973	And No One Could Save Her	Patrick Dooley	Television movie
1973	The Protectors	Prince Carpiano	Episode: "A Case for the Right"
1973	Orson Welles Great Mysteries	Father Crumlish	Episode: "In the Confessional"
1974	QB VII	Dr. Lotaki	3 episodes
1968–1974	Comedy Playhouse	Various Roles	2 episodes
1974	Microbes and Men	Paul Ehrlich	2 episodes
1975	My Son Rueben	Dennis Baxter	Episode: "Better to Have Loved and Lost"
1977	The Best of Families	Patrick Rafferty	Mini-Series
1977	Peter Lundy and the Medicine Hat Stallion	Brisly	TV movie
1980	Portrait of a Rebel: The Remarkable Mrs. Sanger	Higgins	TV movie
1980	A Time for Miracles	Performer	TV movie
1984	Two by Forsyth	Performer	TV movie
1984	Jennifer Slept Here	Grandpa	Episode: "Life with Grandfather"
1984	Ellis Island	Casey O'Donnell	3 episode miniseries
1985	Arena (An Absurd Notion)	Duran Duran	Short video
1986	St. Elsewhere	Brendan Connelly	Episode: "Lost Weekend"
1987	Broken Vows	Monsignor Casey	TV movie
1987	Angel in Green	Father Mahon	TV movie
1987	Once a Hero	Abner Bevis	3 episodes
1987	Who's the Boss	Judge Kresheck	Episode: "Car and Driver"
1987	The Golden Girls	Buddy Rourke	Episode: "Charlie's Buddy"
1988	Beauty and the Beast	Evan Brannigan	Episode: "Temptation"
1991	The Commish	Frank Atkins	Episode: "No Greater Gift"
1992	Cheers	Uncle Roger	Episode: "An Old-Fashioned Wedding"
1993	Murder in the Heartland	Clem Gaughan	2 episodes
1995	Frasier	Dr. Schachter	Episode: "Shrink Rap"
1996	Early Edition	Sherman	Episode: "Pilot"
1998	Spin City	Father Larry	Episode: "The Paul Bearer"
1999	Swing Vote	Justice Greene	TV movie
1999	Oz	Dr. Frederick Garvey	3 episodes
2000	Madigan Men	Milo	2 episodes
2003–2004	The West Wing	Chief Justice Ashland	2 episodes, (final appearance)

=== Theatre ===
Year	Title	Role	Venue	Ref.
1968	Staircase	Harry C. Leeds	Biltmore Theatre, Broadway	
1969	Dear World	The Sewerman	Mark Hellinger Theatre, Broadway	
1976	Mrs. Warren's Profession	Rev. Samuel Gardner	Vivian Beaumont Theatre, Broadway	
1976–1977	Comedians	Eddie Waters	Music Box Theatre, Broadway	
1977–1978	A Touch of the Poet	Jamie Cregan	Helen Hayes Theatre, Broadway	
1979	Pygmalion	Alfred Doolitte	Ahmanson Theatre, California	
1981	My Fair Lady	Alfred Doolitte	Uris Theatre, Broadway	
1981–1982	Mass Appeal	Father Tim Farley	Booth Theatre, Broadway	
1986	Corpse!	Major Walter Powell	Helen Hayes Theatre, Broadway	
1989–1990	Meet Me in St. Louis	Grandpa	Gershwin Theatre, Broadway	
1994	Philadelphia, Here I Come!	S.B. O'Donnell	Center Stage Right, Broadway	

== Awards and nominations ==
Year	Award	Category	Nominated work	Result
1968	British Academy Film Awards	Most Promising Newcomer to Leading Film Roles	Ulysses	Nominated
1968	Tony Awards	Best Leading Actor in a Play	Staircase	Nominated
1982	Tony Awards	Best Leading Actor in a Play	Mass Appeal	Nominated
1982	Drama Desk Award	Outstanding Actor in a Play	Mass Appeal	Nominated
1982	Outer Critics Circle	Best Actor in a Play	Mass Appeal	Won

== See also ==
- List of Irish actors
