= Michael Cusack (Gaelic Athletic Association) =

Founder of the Gaelic Athletic Association

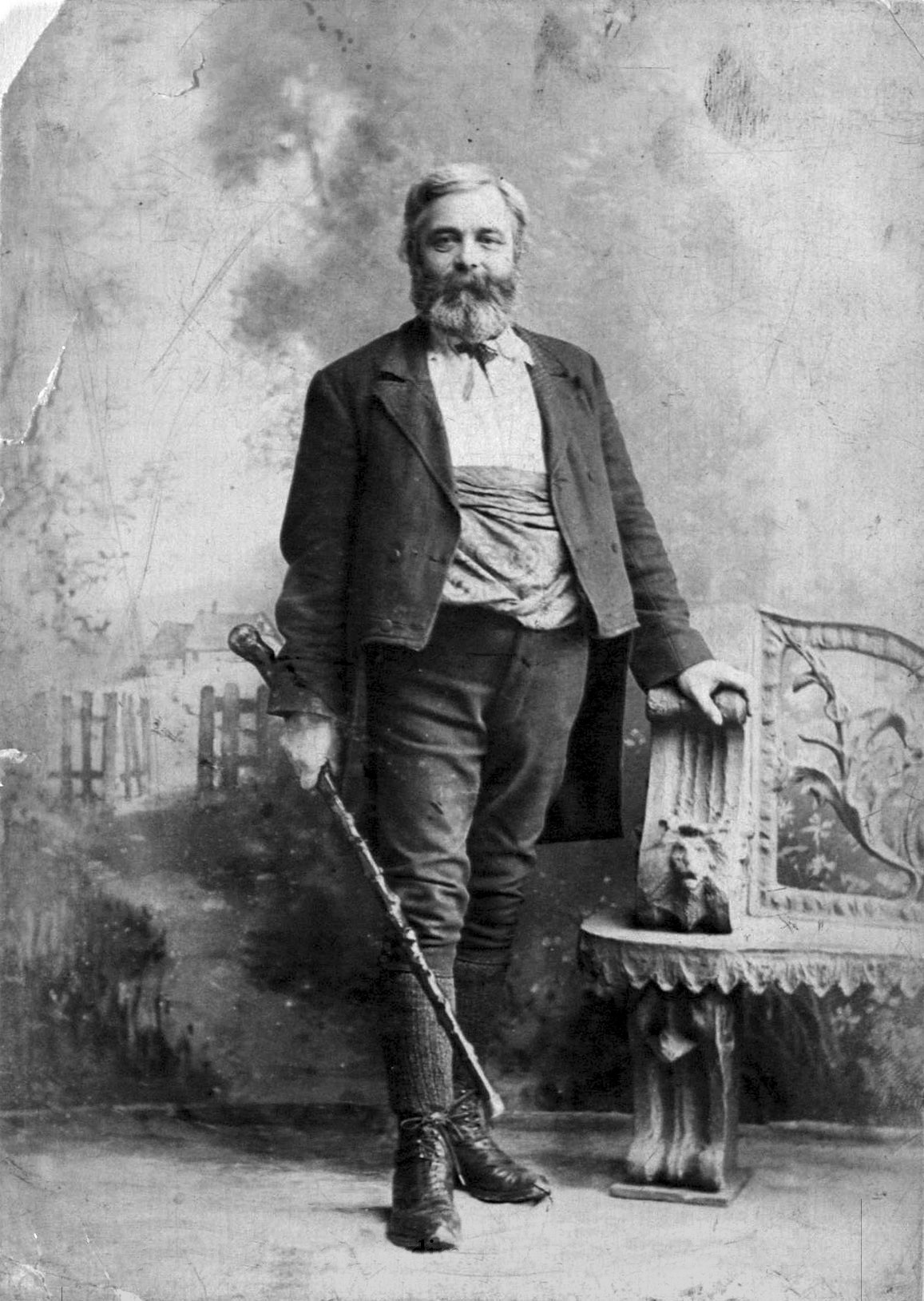
- Born: 20 September 1847; Carran, County Clare, Ireland
- Died: 28 November 1906 (aged 59); Dublin, Ireland
- Burial place: Glasnevin Cemetery, Dublin, Ireland
- Occupations: teacher; newspaper editor
- Known for: Founder of the Gaelic Athletic Association
- Spouse: Margaret Imelda Woods (m. 1876–1890)
- Children: 5 or 6 survived to adulthood

Michael Cusack (/ˈkjuːzæk/ KEW-zak; Irish: Mícheál Cíosóg; 20 September 1847 – 28 November 1906) was an Irish teacher and founder of the Gaelic Athletic Association.

== Early life and education ==
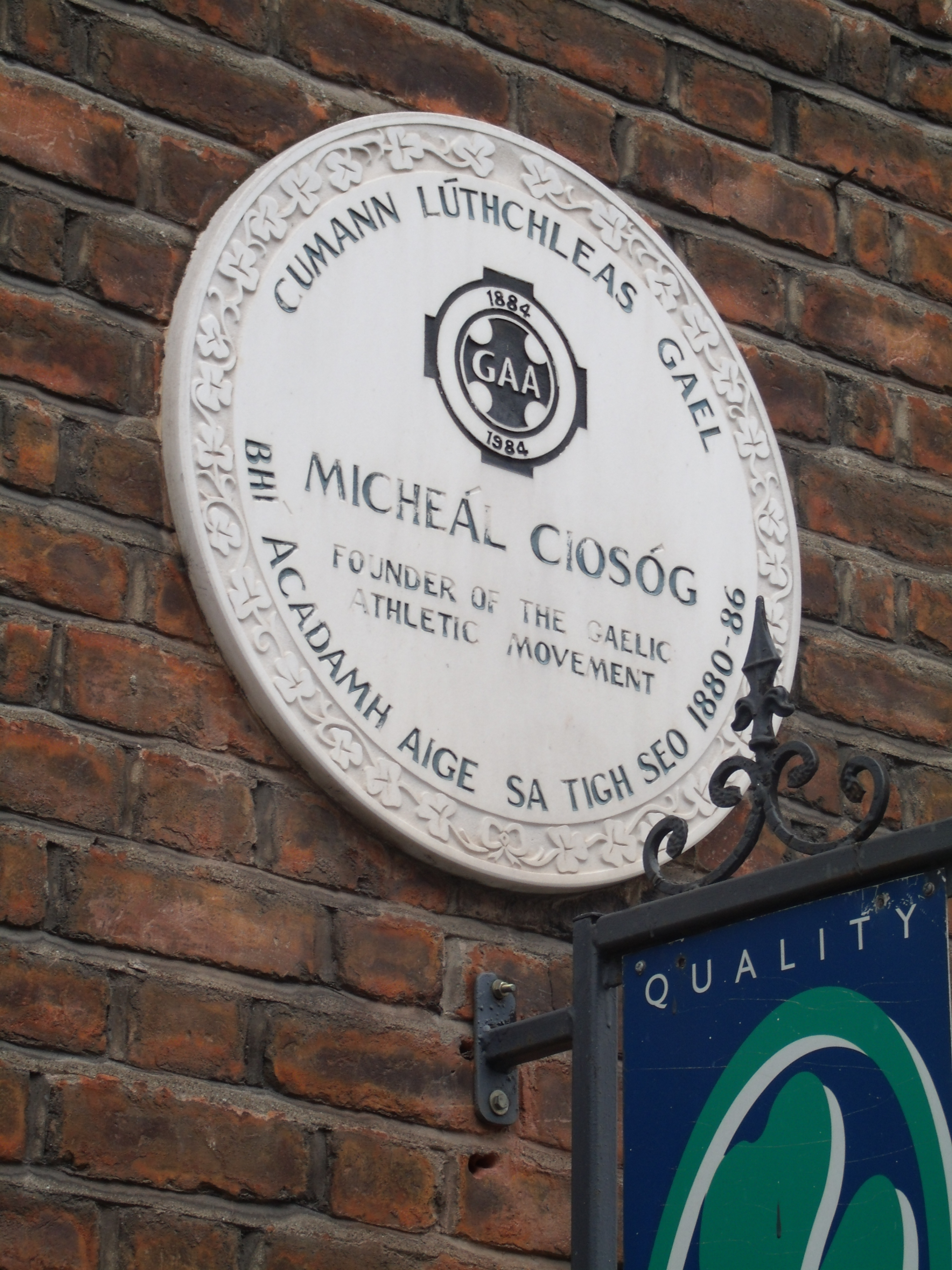
4 Gardiner Place, site of Cusack's Academy between 1880 and 1886

Michael Cusack was born in 1847, during the great Irish famine to fluent Irish-speaking parents, Matthew and Bridget Cusack. The third oldest of five children, he had one sister, Mary and three brothers, John, Patrick and Thomas. Cusack was raised in Carron, in the east of the burren region, County Clare and attended Carron National School, County Clare.

Cusack began training to be a teacher in 1864 and attended District Model School, Enniscorthy, followed by the Central Model School in Marlborough street, County Dublin. He taught at and was principal of Lough Cultra National School, County Galway until 1871 until he moved to teach at St Colmans College in County Down, where he worked as a professor of English and Mathematics for 3 years. From 1874-1875 he taught in Blackrock College, County Dublin and after that in Clongowes Wood College, County Kildare from 1866-7. In 1877, Cusack began to offer tutoring to students preparing for civil service exams, eventually establishing his own academy and running it from his own house in Gardiner Place, County Dublin.

== Marriage and family ==
Cusack married Margaret Imelda Woods, a seamstress from Dromore in County Down born In 1854. They wed in 1876 in St Colmans Church, County Down. It is believed that they had 5 children that survived into adulthood, Clare, Michael, Bride, Francis and John. Their daughters Margaret and Aoife Cusack died as children. In 1890, Margaret Imelda Cusack died after being ill with tuberculosis. After this tragedy the family was separated, with some of the children being sent to orphanages and others to live with relatives.

== Nationalism ==
A romantic nationalist, Cusack was also "reputed" to have been associated with the Fenian movement. He was active in the Gaelic revival: a member of the Society for the Preservation of the Irish Language which was founded in 1876, and later the Gaelic League who in 1879 broke away from the society. Also in 1879, Cusack met Pat Nally, who was a member of the Irish Republican Brotherhood and a leading nationalist and athlete. Cusack found that Nally's views on the influence of British landlordism on Irish athletics were the same as his. Cusack would recall how both Nally and himself while walking through the Phoenix Park in Dublin seeing only a handful of people playing sports in the park so depressed them that they agreed it was time to "make an effort to preserve the physical strength of [their] race." Nally organised a National Athletics Sports meeting in County Mayo in September 1879 which was a success, with Cusack organising a similar event which was open to 'artisans' in Dublin the following April.

== Founding of the Gaelic Athletic Association (GAA) ==
Cusack was fond of sports and was involved in many, including a rugby club that he set up in his own academy, as well as handball, rowing and cricket. An article was written in 1884 by who many believe was Michael Cusack, talking about how English rule has disregarded traditional Irish sports. Cusack arranged a meeting in Hayes's hotel, Thurles, County Tipperary on November 1, 1884, and the Gaelic Athletic Association (GAA) was founded. Maurice Davin was elected to be the president of the association and Cusack became an honorary secretary. Just 18 months after the formation of the association it is believed to have had 50,000 members. In 1886, Just 18 months after Cusack took up this position, He was voted out of office and his Academy closed. In a census from the year 1901, after his wife's passing and family separated, Cusack referred to himself as a journalist and a private tutor.

== Death and legacy ==
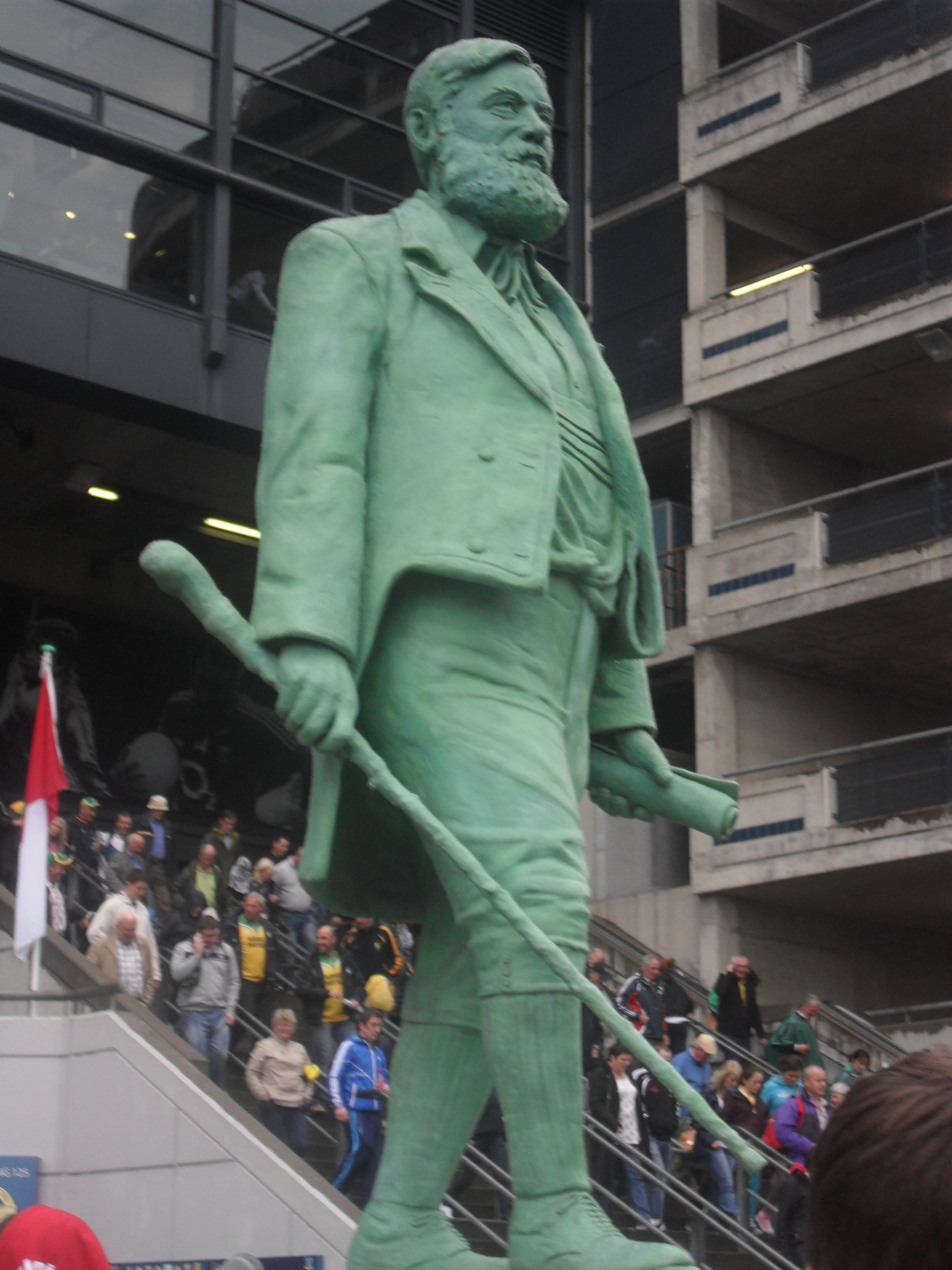
Statue of Cusack in Croke Park, holding a blackthorn stick

Cusack died on Morning Star Avenue, Dublin at 5 pm on Wednesday 28 November 1906 from a final heart attack at the age of 59. Shortly before this in January 1906, Cusack's son John suddenly died at age 27, having an impact on him. Cusack and his wife are buried together in Glasnevin cemetery, Co Dublin along with 3 of their children.

The Cusack stand in Croke Park, the home of GAA in Dublin, Ireland is named after Michael Cusack and his significance to the association. A statue of Michael Cusack stands outside of the entrance

The Michael Cusack Visitor Centre located on the original homestead in Poulaphuca townland, Carran, the Burren, County Clare is dedicated to recounting the fascinating story of Michael Cusack and the idealism which led to him founding the Gaelic Athletic Association.

The bigoted character of "The Citizen" in James Joyce's novel Ulysses is thought to have been at least in part based on what has been described as "a jaundiced portrait of Michael Cusack".

The Clare GAA pitch in Ennis, and the Westmeath GAA pitch in Mullingar, are both named "Cusack Park" in his honour, as is the "Cusack Stand" in Croke Park, Dublin.

The primary school Gaelscoil Mhíchíl Cíosóg in Ennis, County Clare, is also named after him.

Michael Cusacks's Sydney GAA Club was founded in 1988 by a group of Clare men and was named in honour of the man from Carran.

Chicago Michael Cusack Hurling Club is a GAA club consisting entirely of American-born players founded in 2008.

A small collection of family papers was donated to the James Hardiman Library, NUI Galway, by his grandniece, Patricia O'Connell. They include a letter in the form of a diary, written by Cusack on holidays in Lisdoonvarna in July 1902, photographs, a prayer book he gave his wife Margaret (née Woods), and a book of minutes of the Dublin Hurling Club of 1884.
