= The Citizen (character) =

Ulysses character

- First appearance: Ulysses (1922)
- Created by: James Joyce
- Based on: Polyphemus; Michael Cusack

In-universe information
- Gender: Male
- Occupation: unclear, possibly retired
- Religion: Catholic
- Nationality: Irish

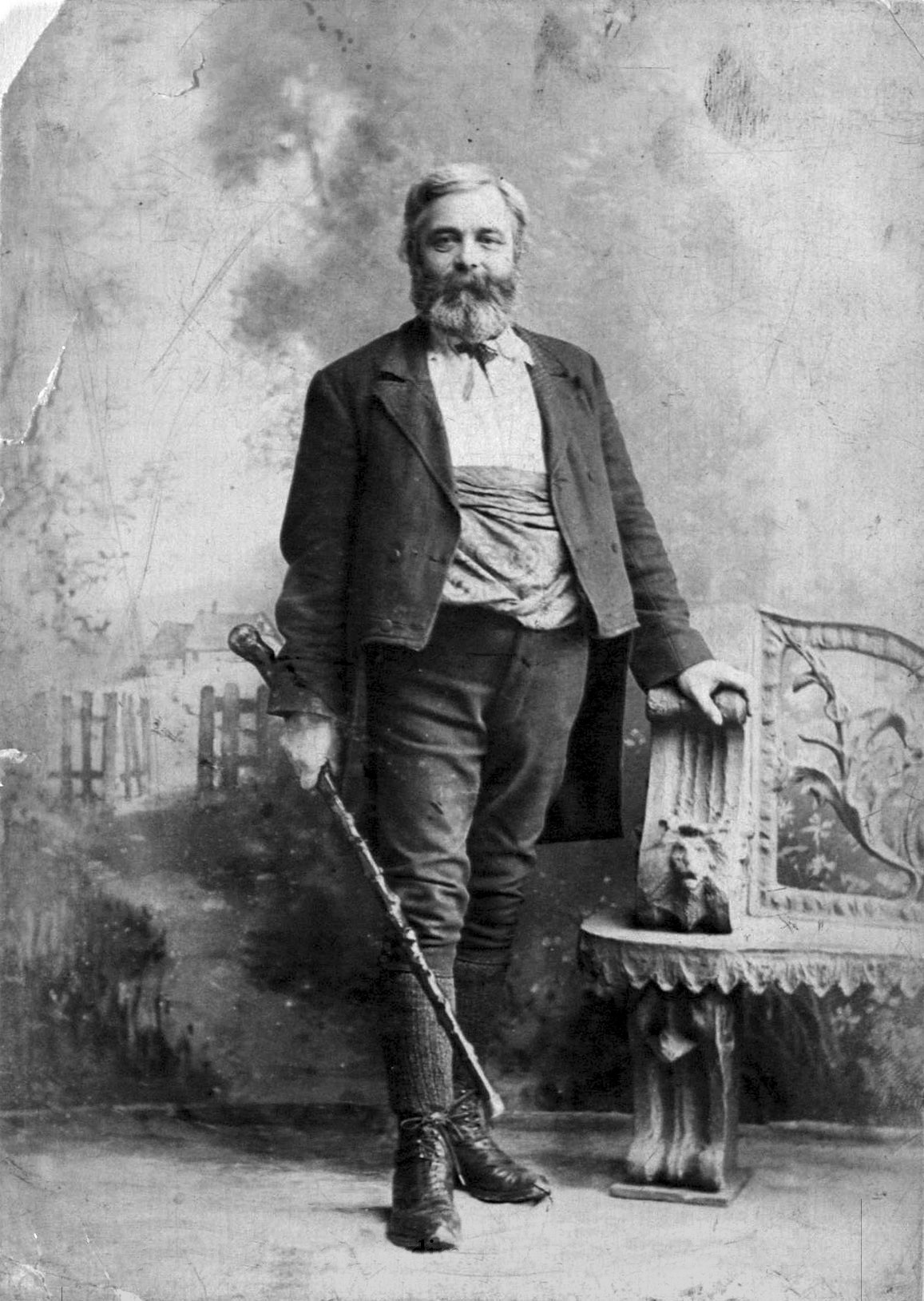
Portrait of Michael Cusack, on whom the Citizen is based.

The Citizen is a fictional character in James Joyce's novel Ulysses. In part, he is a satirical portrait of Irish nationalist (and Gaelic Athletic Association founder) Michael Cusack (1847–1906), and Joyce's portrayal operates to expose what one critic called the "xenophobic ideologies of radical Celticists". The Citizen appears to be a devotee of the Celtic Revival and Irish republicanism, and is well versed in the history of the Irish struggle for freedom against the British Empire. He also appears to be interested in Arthur Griffith's program for a limited Irish autonomy modeled on Hungary's dual monarchy, and uses the name of Griffith's newspaper and later of the political party he inspired ("Sinn Fein! says the citizen. Sinn fein amhain!") as a riposte to Leopold Bloom's assertions about the futility of armed rebellion as part of his xenophobic and antisemitic views expressed in Barney Kiernan's pub. He ultimately accuses Bloom of being an economic parasite on the Irish and a "foreign" Jew, and thus an inauthentic Irishman, as well being cursed by God for rejecting Christ's divinity as symbolized in the apocryphal Christian figure of Ahasuerus. As a gesture of his hatred, the Citizen throws a biscuit tin at Bloom as he departs from the pub. A character based on Cusack also appears in Stephen Hero, described as very stout, black-bearded, always wearing a wideawake hat and a long bright green muffler, with "the voice of an ox... he could be heard at a great distance, criticising, denouncing and scoffing."

The Citizen is an important figure in the "Cyclops" episode of the novel. The character has been described as having characteristics not only of the mythological Cyclops Polyphemus, but also of the Irish epic figure Finn McCool. Since Cusack's biographer never mentions his subject as having been antisemitic and rather only as a man "full of prejudices of all kinds", it has been argued that the Citizen as he appears in the episode is a composite character composed of Joyce's distaste for Griffith's early antisemitic arguments in his first paper, United Irishman, and Cusack's brawniness and Celtic Revival-based patriotism.

== See also ==
- List of Ulysses characters
