= Stephen Dedalus =

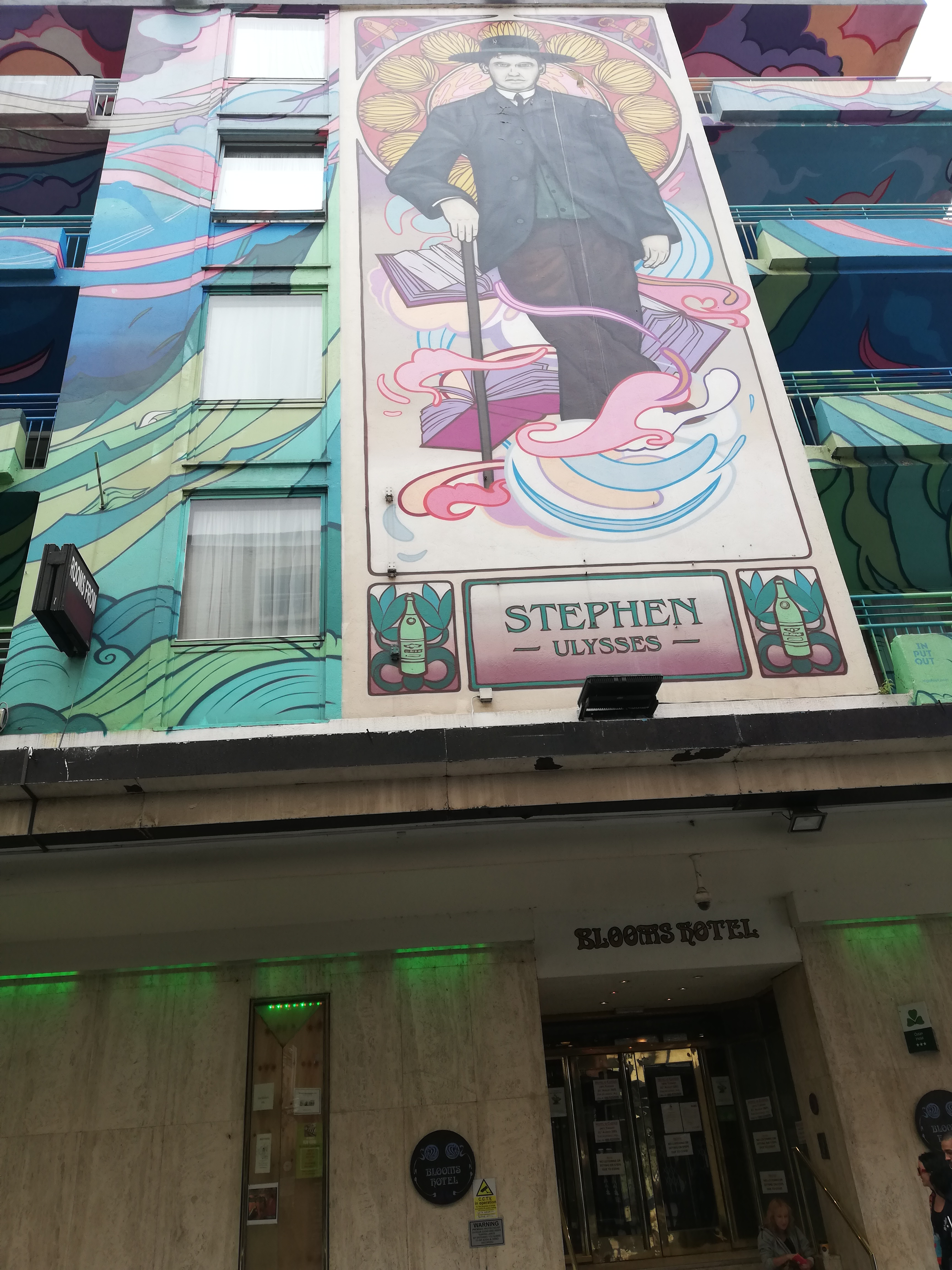
- Public art of Stephen Dedalus, Dublin
- First appearance: A Portrait of the Artist as a Young Man
- Last appearance: Ulysses
- Created by: James Joyce
- Based on: James Joyce (as a youth); Telemachus

In-universe information
- Nickname: Kinch
- Gender: Male
- Occupation: Student (A Portrait of the Artist as a Young Man); Part-time teacher (Ulysses)
- Family: Simon Dedalus (father); Mary (May) Dedalus (mother)
- Nationality: Irish

Stephen Dedalus is James Joyce's literary alter ego, appearing as the protagonist and antihero of his first, semi-autobiographic novel of artistic existence, A Portrait of the Artist as a Young Man (1916), and as a major character in his modernist novel Ulysses (1922). Stephen mirrors many facets of Joyce's own life and personality. Joyce was a talented singer, for example, and in Ulysses Leopold Bloom notes the excellence of Stephen's tenor voice after hearing him sing Johannes Jeep's song "Von der Sirenen Listigkeit".

In Stephen Hero, an early version of A Portrait, Stephen's surname is spelled "Daedalus," a more obvious allusion to the mythological figure Daedalus, a brilliant artificer who constructed a pair of wings for himself and his son Icarus as a means of escaping the island of Crete, where they had been imprisoned by King Minos. Buck Mulligan makes reference to Stephen's mythic namesake in Ulysses, telling him, "Your absurd name, an ancient Greek!" His surname also suggests his desire to "fly" above the constraints of religion, nationality, and politics in his development as an artist. Daedalus had been contracted by King Minos to build the Labyrinth in which he would imprison his wife's son the Minotaur. Stephen's surname may also reflect the labyrinthine quality of his developmental journey in A Portrait of the Artist as a Young Man. Stephen's first name recalls the first Christian martyr. The theme of martyrdom runs throughout the novel.

== Fictional biography ==
Once upon a time and a very good time it was there was a moocow coming down along the road and this moocow that was coming down along the road met a nicens little boy named baby tuckoo ...

His father told him that story: his father looked at him through a glass: he had a hairy face.

He was baby tuckoo. The moocow came down the road where Betty Byrne lived: she sold lemon platt.

— James Joyce, opening to A Portrait of the Artist as a Young Man

The childhood of Stephen Dedalus is recounted using vocabulary that changes as he grows, in a voice not his own but sensitive to his feelings. The reader experiences Stephen's fears and bewilderment as he comes to terms with the world in a series of disjointed episodes. Stephen attends the Jesuit-run Clongowes Wood College, where the apprehensive, intellectually gifted boy suffers the ridicule of his classmates while he learns the schoolboy codes of behaviour. While he cannot yet grasp their significance, at a Christmas dinner he is witness to the social, political and religious tensions in Ireland involving Charles Stewart Parnell, which drive wedges between members of his family, leaving Stephen with doubts over which social institutions he can place his faith in. Back at Clongowes, word spreads that a number of older boys have been caught "smugging" (the term refers to the secret homosexual horseplay that five students were caught at); discipline is tightened, and the Jesuits increase use of corporal punishment. Stephen is strapped when one of his instructors believes he has broken his glasses to avoid studying. Prodded by his classmates, Stephen works up the courage to complain to the rector, Father Conmee, who assures him there will be no such recurrence, leaving Stephen with a sense of triumph.

Stephen's father gets into debt and the family leaves its pleasant suburban home to live in Dublin. Stephen realises that he will not return to Clongowes. However, thanks to a scholarship obtained for him by Father Conmee, Stephen is able to attend Belvedere College, where he excels academically and becomes a class leader. Stephen squanders a large cash prize from school, and begins to see prostitutes, as distance grows between him and his drunken father.

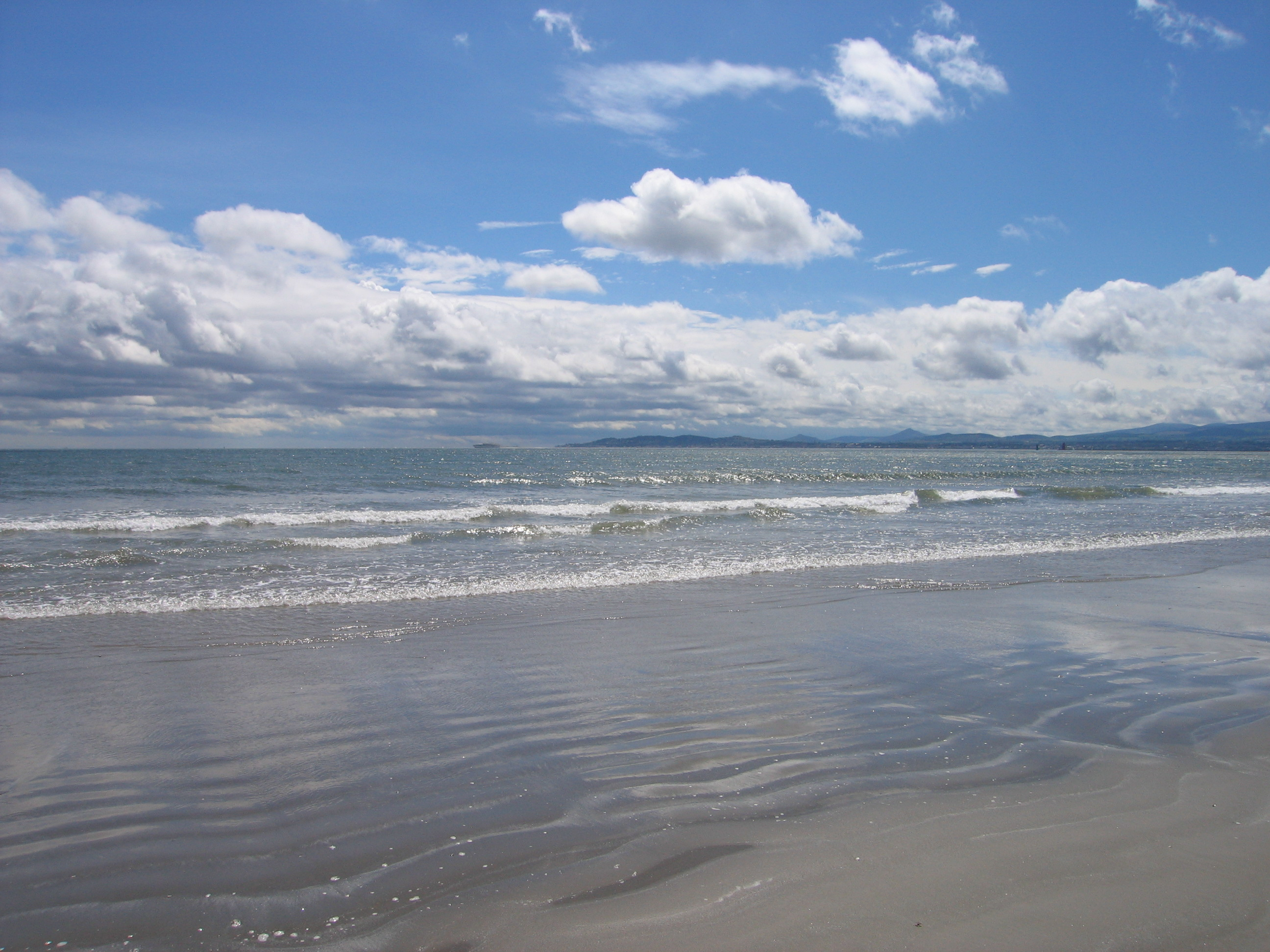
Stephen Dedalus has an aesthetic epiphany along Dollymount Strand.

As Stephen abandons himself to sensual pleasures, his class is taken on a religious retreat, where the boys sit through sermons. Stephen pays special attention to those on pride, guilt, punishment and the Four Last Things (death, judgement, Hell, and Heaven). He feels that the words of the sermon, describing horrific eternal punishment in hell, are directed at him and, overwhelmed, comes to desire forgiveness. Overjoyed at his return to the Church, he devotes himself to acts of ascetic repentance, though they soon devolve to mere acts of routine, as his thoughts turn elsewhere. His devotion comes to the attention of the Jesuits, and they encourage him to consider entering the priesthood. Stephen takes time to consider, but has a crisis of faith because of the conflict between his spiritual beliefs and his aesthetic ambitions. Along Dollymount Strand he spots a girl wading, and has an epiphany in which he is overcome with the desire to find a way to express her beauty in his writing.

As a student at University College, Dublin, Stephen grows increasingly wary of the institutions around him: Church, school, politics and family. In the midst of the disintegration of his family's fortunes, his father berates him and his mother urges him to return to the Church. An increasingly dry, humourless Stephen explains his alienation from the Church and the aesthetic theory he has developed to his friends, who find that they cannot accept either of them. Stephen concludes that Ireland is too restrictive to allow him to express himself fully as an artist, so he decides that he will have to leave. He sets his mind on self-imposed exile, but not without declaring in his diary his ties to his homeland:

... I go to encounter for the millionth time the reality of experience and to forge in the smithy of my soul the uncreated conscience of my race.

In Ulysses, Stephen is back in Dublin, having returned because his mother was dying. He refused to kneel at her deathbed, a memory that will haunt him throughout the day. He is the character who corresponds to Telemachus; less overtly, he embodies aspects of Hamlet. He is the protagonist of the first three episodes. Subsequently, Leopold Bloom is introduced. The two will miss each other, not meeting until late in the novel.

Ovid described Daedalus in the Metamorphoses (VIII:183–235) as being shut up in a tower to prevent his knowledge of the Labyrinth from spreading to the public. Stephen is introduced taking breakfast in the Sandycove Martello tower in Dublin on the morning of 16 June 1904. Stephen shares his opinions about religion, especially as they relate to the recent death of his mother, with his quasi-friend Buck Mulligan, who manages to offend Stephen before making plans as they part ways to go drinking later that evening. In the second episode Stephen teaches a class of boys a history lesson on ancient Rome. In the "Proteus" episode (in Greek myth Proteus was the old man of the sea and the shepherd of sea animals who knew all things past, present, and future but disliked telling what he knew), Stephen ambles along the strand as his thoughts are related in the form of an internal monologue.

Following several episodes centering on Bloom, Stephen returns to the fore of the novel in the library episode, in which he expounds at length to some acquaintances his theory of the obscurely autobiographical nature of Shakespeare's works and questions the institution of fatherhood, deeming it to be a fiction. He discredits his own ideas afterward, suggesting a lack of self-confidence.

Bloom visits the maternity hospital where Mina Purefoy is giving birth, and finally meets Stephen, who has been drinking with his medical student friends and is awaiting the promised arrival of Buck Mulligan. The young men become boisterous, and start discussing such topics as fertility, contraception and abortion. They continue on to a pub to continue drinking, following the successful birth of a son to Mina Purefoy.

The episode is written as a play script, complete with stage directions. The action is frequently interrupted by "hallucinations" experienced by Stephen and Bloom—fantastic manifestations of the fears and passions of the two characters. Stephen and his friend Lynch walk into Nighttown, Dublin's red-light district. Bloom pursues them and eventually finds them at Bella Cohen's brothel. Bloom sees Stephen overpay at the brothel, and decides to hold onto the rest of his money for safekeeping. Stephen hallucinates that his mother's rotting cadaver has risen up from the floor to confront him. He cries "Non serviam!," uses his walking stick to smash a chandelier, and flees the room. Bloom quickly pays Bella for the damage, then runs after Stephen. He finds Stephen engaged in an argument with an English soldier, Private Carr, who, after a perceived insult to the King, punches Stephen. The police arrive and the crowd disperses. As Bloom tends to Stephen, he has a hallucination of his deceased son, Rudy, as an 11-year-old.

Bloom takes Stephen to a cabman's shelter near Butt Bridge to restore him to his senses. There, they encounter a drunken sailor, D. B. Murphy (W. B. Murphy in the 1922 text). The episode is dominated by the motif of confusion and mistaken identity, with Bloom, Stephen and Murphy's identities being repeatedly called into question. Bloom returns home with Stephen, makes him a cup of cocoa, discusses cultural and linguistic differences between them, considers the possibility of publishing Stephen's parable stories, and offers him a place to stay for the night. Stephen refuses Bloom's offer and is ambiguous in response to Bloom's proposal of future meetings. The two men urinate in the backyard, Stephen departs and wanders off into the night, and Bloom goes to bed, where Molly is sleeping.

Hugh Kenner, writing in 1948, was critical of Stephen Dedalus, the protagonist of A Portrait, arguing that he “does not become an artist at all . . . but an aesthete” and “to take him seriously is very hard indeed.” Kenner lamented, “It is painful to be invited to close the book with an indigestibly Byronic hero stuck in our throats.”

A later version of Kenner’s 1948 essay appeared in his first book on Joyce published in 1955.

Writing in 1959, William York Tindall was also critical of Stephen Dedalus, saying “he never sees himself entirely.” Tindall regretted Stephen’s “failure to realize himself,” adding that “this is attended to in Ulysses, which makes A Portrait seem preliminary sketch.”

In 1963 S. L. Goldberg took issue with Kenner’s negative appraisal of Stephen, conceding that “Mr. Kenner is certainly right in pointing to the irony with which Joyce views him in both the Portrait and Ulysses,” but faulting him for concluding that in doing so Joyce is rejecting Stephen himself. For Goldberg, Joyce’s “irony is a qualifying criticism, which does not imply a total rejection.”

It has been argued that Joyce used the doctrines of the Incarnation cited early in Ulysses to characterize his relation to both Stephen Dedalus and Leopold Bloom and their relation to each other. Two of the doctrines have been linked to signify that Stephen, though a separate person, shares Joyce’s nature and that Joyce speaks through him. His Hamlet theory is a continuation of his aesthetic theory in A Portrait of the Artist as a Young Man.

== Quotations ==
When the soul of a man is born in this country there are nets flung at it to hold it back from flight. You talk to me of nationality, language, religion. I shall try to fly by those nets.

—A Portrait of the Artist as a Young Man, Chapter 5

A man of genius makes no mistakes. His errors are volitional and are the portals of discovery.

—Ulysses, Episode 9

Welcome, O life, I go to encounter for the millionth time the reality of experience and to forge in the smithy of my soul the uncreated conscience of my race. Old father, old artificer, stand me now and ever in good stead.

—A Portrait of the Artist as a Young Man

History is a nightmare from which I am trying to awake.

—Ulysses, Episode 2

I fear those big words that make us so unhappy.

—Ulysses, Episode 2

Touch me. Soft eyes. Soft soft soft hand. I am lonely here. O, touch me soon, now. What is that word known to all men? I am quiet here alone. Sad too. Touch, touch me.

—Ulysses, Episode 3

== Sources ==
- Fargnoli, A. Nicholas; Gillespie, Michael Patrick (2006). Critical Companion to James Joyce: A Literary Reference to His Life and Work. Infobase Publishing. ISBN 978-1-4381-0848-3.
