= Paddy (film) =

1970 Irish film by Daniel Haller

- Directed by: Daniel Haller
- Starring: Milo O'Shea
- Distributed by: Allied Artists
- Release date: 1970
- Country: Ireland
- Language: English

Paddy is a 1970 Irish comedy film directed by Daniel Haller and starring Milo O'Shea, Des Cave and Dearbhla Molloy. The film follows the adventures of a Dublin butcher's assistant.

It was made for $250,000 and sold to Allied Artists for $750,000. Roger Corman helped finance it.

== Cast ==
- Milo O'Shea – Harry Redmond
- Des Cave – Paddy Maguire
- Dearbhla Molloy – Maureen
- Maureen Toal – Clair Kearney
- Peggy Cass – Irenee
- Judy Cornwell – Breeda
- Donal LeBlanc – Larry Maguire
- Lillian Rapple – Mrs Doyle
- Desmond Perry – Cahill
- Marie O'Donnell – Mrs Maguire
