= San Francisco International Arts Festival =

Annual arts festival in California, US

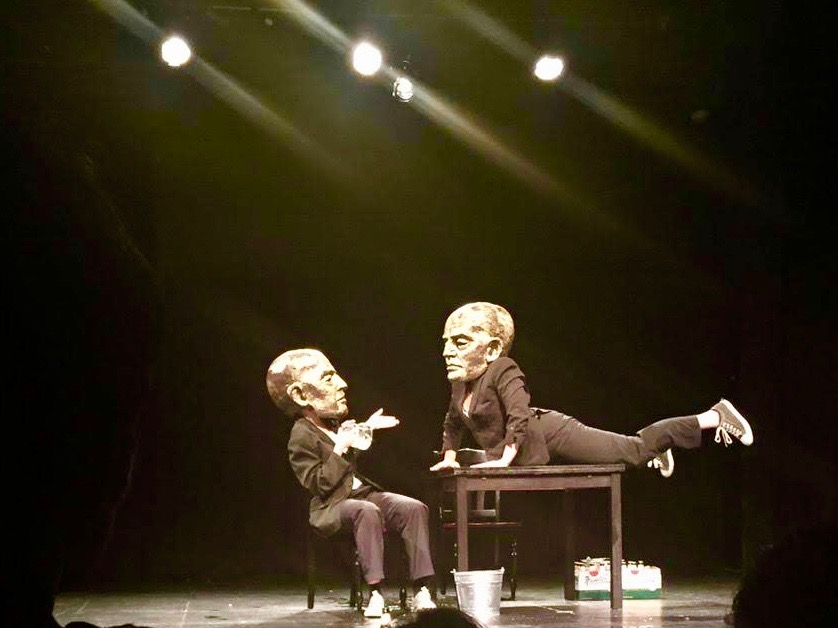
- Performance of Antiwords at the 2019 SFIAF
- Genre: Arts festival
- Date: May–June
- Locations: San Francisco, California, United States
- Founded: 2003
- Founders: Andrew Wood
- Website: sfiaf.org

The San Francisco International Arts Festival (SFIAF) is a multicultural performing arts festival held annually during the first two weeks of May in multiple venues in the Mission District of San Francisco, California. SFIAF presents the work of ground-breaking performing artists from the Bay Area and around the world; many of the international artists do not have US representation and have rarely (or never previously) performed in this country. From 2003 to 2026 SFIAF and more than 100 presenting partners have coordinated, presented and/or produced performances by 800 artists and arts ensembles from the Bay Area and over 60 other countries, as well as conducting numerous educational and outreach activities.

== History ==
The first SFIAF was held between September 4 to 21, 2003 at Yerba Buena Center for the Arts. A total of 15 ensembles performed at the festival, eight of which were from the San Francisco Bay Area and seven were from abroad. Of these, Akram Khan Dance Company (London), Salia nï Seydou (Burkina Faso), and Quasar Companhia de Danca (Brazil) all made their northern California debuts. The second SFIAF was held between May 18 to June 5, 2005, and presented a total of 23 productions, four by international artists, six as international collaborations of local artists working with artists from other countries, and 13 by local artists. Beginning with the 2005 season, SFIAF has been held in late May and early June. In its early years, before the festival made Fort Mason its principal venue in 2009, SFIAF presented shows at a number of different venues throughout San Francisco, including the Yerba Buena Center for the Arts, Theater Artaud, Mission High School, and Fort Mason. Beginning with the 2015 season that was held from May 21 to June 7 and that showcased performances by 70 local and international ensembles, all performances have been staged at Fort Mason Center for Arts and Culture. The 2020 Festival was cancelled due to the coronavirus pandemic.

During the pandemic, SFIAF worked to develop safe and socially distanced outdoor performances. After more than six months of pandemic lock-down and supported by grants from the San Francisco Arts Commission and the Phyllis C. Wattis Foundation, SFIAF presented the first legally permitted public performances in San Francisco on October 24-25, 2020. The event safely featured 16 live concerts and performances for a total live audience of over 700 people and was live-streamed to several thousand more.

SFIAF continued to work with dozens of Bay Area artists to research and stage outdoor performances in and around Fort Mason. However, as pandemic restrictions stretched into years, it became clear that the Fort Mason Center had suffered severe financial losses and would no longer be able to partner with SFIAF.

In July 2022, the Festival's board of directors voted to return the Festival program to the Mission District. A first run (minus international artists) took place in 2023 and the full Festival returned in May 2024.

== Recent seasons ==
The 2018 season of SFIAF took place at Fort Mason Center for Arts and Culture between May 24 and June 3 and showcased some 40 local and international artists and ensembles. Commemorating the 50th anniversary of Martin Luther King Jr.'s assassination, the festival's theme was Down by the Riverside. The headline concert 'Down by the Riverside: Requiem for a King,' a composition by Anthony Brown with spoken word by Angela Davis saw its world-premier on May 26 in Fort Mason's Cowell Theater. The 2019 season of SFIAF took place from May 23 to June 2 at Fort Mason Center for Arts and Culture, showcasing some 50 local and international artists and ensembles. Themed The Path to Democracy, the festival presented a number of productions that directly or indirectly engaged with political activism, such as Théatre de la Feuille's (Hong Kong) new adaptation of 'The Orphan of Zhao' or Spitfire Company's (Czech Republic) 'Antiwords', inspired by the late Václav Havel's play 'Audience'. Two of the companies that had originally been scheduled to appear at this year's festival, the Compagnie Virginie Brunelle, a modern dance group based in Montreal, Canada, and Collective Ma’louba, a Syrian theater company based in Germany, were denied visas to the US and their shows had to be cancelled.

== Productions ==
SFIAF is primarily a presenting organization but has also produced projects over the years. These productions include:

2005-7 “A Long Way Home: Concertizing the Golden Triangle” composed and arranged by Linda Tillery & The Cultural Heritage Choir with Black Voices (UK). 2008-10 “Crazy Cloud” by Shinichi Iova-Koga and inkBoat in collaboration with Ko Murobushi (Japan). 2009-12 “PLACAS: The Most Dangerous Tattoo” written by Paul S. Flores, directed by Michael John Garces, starring Ric Salinas. 2013-15 “Classic Black” written by/starring Devorah Major with Brian Freeman, directed by Ellen Sebastian Chang. 2016-18 “IYA: The Esselen Remember” (staged readings) written by Luis Juarez of Baktun 12 in collaboration with the Ohlone Costanoan Esselen Nation, directed by Kinan Valdez. 2020-22 “Daughters of the Delta” composed by Michelle Jacques and Cava Menzies with arrangements by Bryan Dyer. 2021-22 "Religion Kitendi: Dress Code" directed and choreographed by Chanel “Byb” Bibene with original music by Manolo Davila for Kiandanda Dance Theater.
