= 2008 in public domain =

When a work's copyright expires, it enters the public domain. The following is a list of works that entered the public domain in 2008. Since laws vary globally, the copyright status of some works are not uniform.

== Entered the public domain in countries with life + 70 years ==
With the exception of Belarus (Life + 50 years) and Spain (Life + 80 years for creators that died before 1987), a work enters the public domain in Europe 70 years after the creator's death, if it was published during the creator's lifetime. The list is sorted alphabetically and includes a notable work of the creator that entered the public domain on January 1, 2008.

Names	Country	Birth	Death	Occupation	Notable work
J. M. Barrie	United Kingdom	9 May 1860	19 June 1937	novelist, playwright.	The Little White Bird, Peter and Wendy
Julian Bell	United Kingdom	4 February 1908	18 July 1937	poet, book editor.	Winter Movement, Work for the Winter
Jean de Brunhoff	France	9 December 1899	16 October 1937	children's writer, illustrator.	The Story of Babar, Babar and Father Christmas
Ellis Parker Butler	United States	5 December 1869	13 September 1937	short story writer, essayist.	Pigs Is Pigs, Philo Gubb, The Correspondence School Detective
Ralph Connor	Canada	13 September 1860	31 October 1937	novelist.	Black Rock, a Tale of the Selkirks, The Gay Crusader
Frederic Taber Cooper	United States	27 May 1864	20 May 1937	magazine editor, historian.	Word formation in the Roman Sermo Plebeius. An historical study of the development of vocabulary in vulgar and late Latin, with special reference to the Romance languages, History of the Nineteenth Century in Caricature
John Drinkwater	United Kingdom	1 June 1882	25 March 1937	poet, dramatist.	Abraham Lincoln, The Death of Leander
Florence Dugdale	United Kingdom	12 January 1879	17 October 1937	children's writer, biographer.	The Book of Baby Birds, The Later Years of Thomas Hardy, 1892–1928
Edward Garnett	United Kingdom	5 January 1868	19 February 1937	writer, critic, literary editor.	The Breaking Point, a Censured Play. With Preface and a Letter to the Censor, The great war in 1916, a neutral's indictment
Ivor Gurney	United Kingdom	28 August 1890	26 December 1937	poet, composer.	Five Elizabethan Songs , The Western Playland
Elizabeth Haldane	United Kingdom	27 May 1862	24 December 1937	biographer, philosopher.	From One Century to Another: The Reminiscences of Elizabeth S. Haldane, The Scotland of our Fathers: A Study of Scottish Life in the Nineteenth Century
W. F. Harvey	United Kingdom	14 April 1885	4 June 1937	horror fiction writer.	August Heat, Midnight House and Other Tales
William F. Lloyd	Newfoundland	17 December 1864	13 June 1937	journalist, newspaper editor.	editor of The Telegram
H. P. Lovecraft	United States	20 August 1890	15 March 1937	writer of weird fiction, fantasy, and horror fiction.	The Call of Cthulhu, The Dream-Quest of Unknown Kadath
Don Marquis	United States	29 July 1878	29 December 1937	humorist, novelist, poet, newspaper columnist, and playwright.	The Dark Hours, archy and mehitabel
H. C. McNeile	United Kingdom	28 September 1888	14 August 1937	writer of thrillers and war stories.	Bulldog Drummond, The Black Gang
Chūya Nakahara	Japan	29 April 1907	22 October 1937	poet, translator.	Goat Songs, Songs of Bygone Days
Tomas O'Crohan	Republic of Ireland	21 December 1856	7 March 1937	diarist, memoirist.	Island Cross-Talk, The Islandman
Horacio Quiroga	Uruguay	31 December 1878	19 February 1937	playwright, poet, short story writer.	Stories of Love, Madness, and Death, Jungle Tales
Jean-Joseph Rabearivelo	Madagascar	4 March 1901	22 June 1937	poet, novelist, opera writer, literary critic, journal editor.	The Cup of Ashes, The Red Dawn
Albert Verwey	Netherlands	15 May 1865	8 March 1937	poet, translator, literary historian.	Persephone
Edith Wharton	United States	24 January 1862	11 August 1937	novelist, short story writer.	The Age of Innocence, The House of Mirth

== Entered the public domain in countries with life + 50 years ==
In most countries of Africa and Asia, as well as Belarus, Bolivia, Canada, New Zealand, Egypt and Uruguay; a work enters the public domain 50 years after the creator's death.

Names	Country	Birth	Death	Occupation	Notable work
Sholem Asch	Poland	1 November 1880	10 July 1957	dramatist, essayist, novelist.	In a Bad Time, God of Vengeance
Arturo Barea	Spain	20 September 1897	24 December 1957	autobiographer, radio broadcaster.	The Forging of a Rebel, Struggle for the Spanish Soul
Roy Campbell	South Africa	2 October 1901	23 April 1957	literary critic, poet, satirist, translator.	The Wayzgoose: A South African Satire, The Georgiad – A Satirical Fantasy in Verse
Joyce Cary	Ireland	7 December 1888	29 March 1957	poet, short story writer.	Mister Johnson, The Horse's Mouth
A. E. Coppard	United Kingdom	4 January 1878	13 January 1957	poet, short story writer.	Fearful Pleasures, Nixey's Harlequin
William Craigie	United Kingdom	13 August 1867	2 September 1957	lexicographer, philologist.	editor for the Oxford English Dictionary, founding editor of the Dictionary of the Older Scottish Tongue
Alfred Döblin	Germany	10 August 1878	26 June 1957	essayist, novelist.	Berlin Alexanderplatz, The Three Leaps of Wang Lun
Lord Dunsany	Ireland	24 July 1878	25 October 1957	short story writer, playwright, novelist, poet.	The King of Elfland's Daughter, The Gods of Pegāna
May Edginton	United Kingdom	20 December 1883	17 June 1957	novelist, playwright.	Secrets, The Prude's Fall
Ernest Elmore	United Kingdom	4 November 1901	8 November 1957	crime novelist, fantasy writer.	The Lake District Murder, The Cornish Coast Murder
Rose Fyleman	United Kingdom	6 March 1877	1 August 1957	children's writer, playwright, poet, translator.	There are fairies at the bottom of our garden, Lift your hidden faces
Oliver St. John Gogarty	Ireland	17 August 1878	22 September 1957	playwright, oet.	Blight, As I Was Going Down Sackville Street
Barbu Lăzăreanu	Romania	5 October 1881	19 January 1957	bibliographer, literary historian, satirist.	Constantin Radovici, Agatha Bârsescu, Nora Marinescu, Slabs and Debris from Epidaurus' Temple
José Lins do Rego	Brazil	3 July 1901	12 September 1957	novelist.	Menino de engenho (Plantation boy), Pureza
Malcolm Lowry	United Kingdom	28 July 1909	26 June 1957	novelist, poet.	Under the Volcano, Ultramarine
Curzio Malaparte	Italy	9 June 1898	19 July 1957	filmmaker, war correspondent.	Kaputt, The Skin
Mait Metsanurk	Estonia	19 November 1879	21 August 1957	novelist, short story writer, playwright.	Ümera jõel (On the Ümera River), Uues korteris
Gabriela Mistral	Chile	7 April 1889	10 January 1957	poet.	Sonetos de la Muerte (Sonnets of Death), Despair
Christopher Morley	United States	5 May 1890	28 March 1957	essayist, journalist, novelist, poet.	Parnassus on Wheels, The Haunted Bookshop
Mulshankar Mulani	Gujarat	1 November 1867	14 December 1957	playwright.	Saubhagya Sundari, Barrister
John Middleton Murry	United Kingdom	6 August 1889	12 March 1957	essayist, literary critic.	God: An Introduction to the Science of Metabiology, Katherine Mansfield and Other Literary Portraits
Leo Perutz	Austria	2 November 1882	25 August 1957	horror novelist, mathematician.	From Nine to Nine, The Master of the Day of Judgement
Rhoda Power	United Kingdom	29 May 1890	9 March 1957	children's writer, historical novelist.	Redcap Runs Away, From the Fury of the Northmen: and Other Stories That Shaped Our Destiny in 18th to 19th Century England
Dorothy Richardson	United Kingdom	17 May 1873	17 June 1957	novelist, journalist.	Pilgrimage, Pointed Roofs
Kenneth Roberts	United States	8 December 1885	21 July 1957	historical novelist.	Northwest Passage, Lydia Bailey
Dorothy L. Sayers	United Kingdom	13 June 1893	17 December 1957	crime novelist, literary critic, playwright, poet, translator.	The Nine Tailors, Whose Body?
Giuseppe Tomasi di Lampedusa	Italy	23 December 1896	23 July 1957	historical novelist.	The Leopard, The Professor and the Siren
Stanley Vestal	United States	15 August 1887	25 December 1957	biographer, historian, novelist.	Kit Carson, the Happy Warrior of the West, Sitting Bull-Champion of the Sioux-a Biography
Laura Ingalls Wilder	United States	7 February 1867	10 February 1957	novelist, journalist.	Little House in the Big Woods, Little House on the Prairie
Alfred Eckhard Zimmern	United Kingdom	26 January 1879	24 November 1957	classical scholar, historian, political scientist.	The Greek Commonwealth: Politics and Economics in Fifth Century Athens, The Third British Empire
Louis B. Mayer	United States	12 July 1884	29 October 1957	Filmmaker	

== Entering the public domain in the United States ==
In the United States, the copyright status of works extends for the life of the author or artists, plus 70 years. If the work is owned by a corporation, then the copyright extends 95 years.

Due to the passing of the Copyright Term Extension Act (Sonny Bono Copyright Term Extension Act) in 1998, works never registered or published before January 1, 1978, and whose authors died before 1938 entered the public domain in this jurisdiction on January 1, 2008. Other works would not enter the public domain here until 2019.

== See also ==
- 1907 in literature and 1957 in literature for deaths of writers
- Public Domain Day
- Creative Commons
