= Espaço Cultural José Lins do Rego =

Cultural center in João Pessoa, Brazil

Cultural Space José Lins do Rêgo
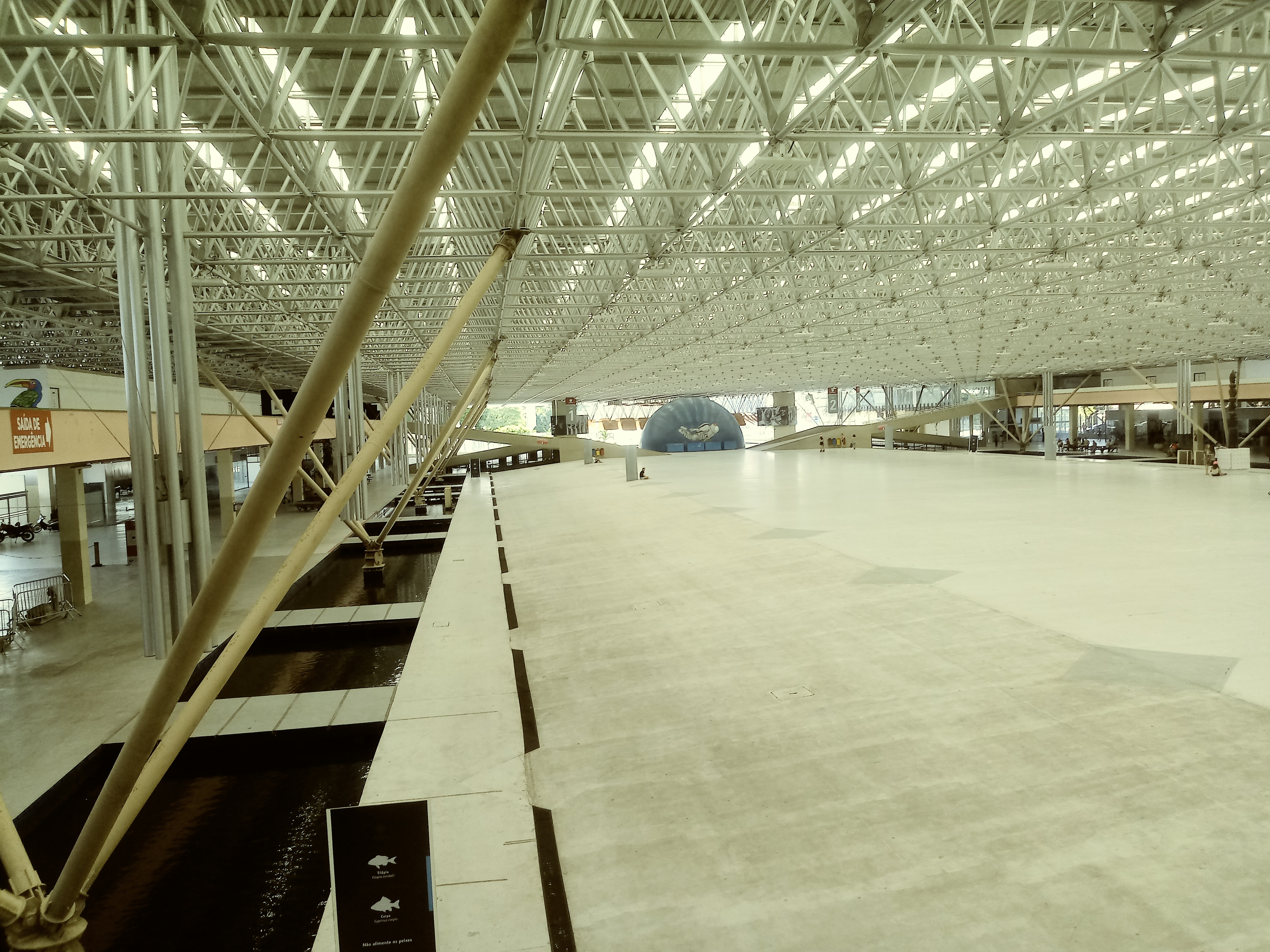
- Interactive map of Cultural Space José Lins do Rêgo
- Location: Abdias Gomes de Almeida, 800, Tambauzinho, João Pessoa, Paraíba, Brazil
- Coordinates: 7.1221°S 34.8452°W
- Owner: Government of the State of Paraíba
- Capacity: 15,000

Construction
- Opened: March 19, 1982
- Architect: Sérgio Bernardes

Espaço Cultural José Lins do Rêgo (English: Cultural Space José Lins do Rêgo) is a multi-purpose indoor arena, offering a center of culture, conventions, art, cinema, and astronomical in Brazil, located in the Brazilian city of João Pessoa in the state of Paraíba. It is a reference to architectural work throughout the country. It was built through a project developed by the architect Sérgio Bernardes. The Cultural Equipment has modern architecture in its characteristics. It was considered the first example of the metallic structure of the capital of Paraíba. The work has a strong monumental and symbolic character; its construction values the plastic expression and the functional capacity of the materials used. The architecture reinforces the contemporary and rational character of the use of spaces, among other aspects.

Offers a number of attractions, the Archidy Picado Gallery, Lutheria, Planetarium, José Lins do Rêgo Museum, Anthenor Navarro Music School, Arena Theater, Paulo Pontes Theater, Dance School, Science Station and mezzanines for exhibitions, Circus School and the Juarez Library are on site. Batista range.

The cultural space pays homage to the Brazilian writer, born in the state of Paraíba, José Lins do Rego, best known for his semi-autobiographical "cane cycle". the author of Menino de engenho, who gained international prominence with his works.

== History ==
The José Lins do Rêgo Cultural Space, headquarters of the Espaço Cultural Foundation (FUNESC) is a Cultural Complex and Convention Center. It was inaugurated in 1982, under the Tarcísio de Miranda Burity Government. It is a reference architectural work throughout the country. It was built through the project developed by the architect Sérgio Bernardes.

The cladding and sealing structure had “Technology and Regionalism” marks, where they present, in addition to the metal frame, reinforced pillars, large reinforced concrete spans and laminated wood. The area has acoustic ventilation and lighting, integrating the interior and exterior, allowing accessibility. The project was considered controversial, due to its size and complexity.

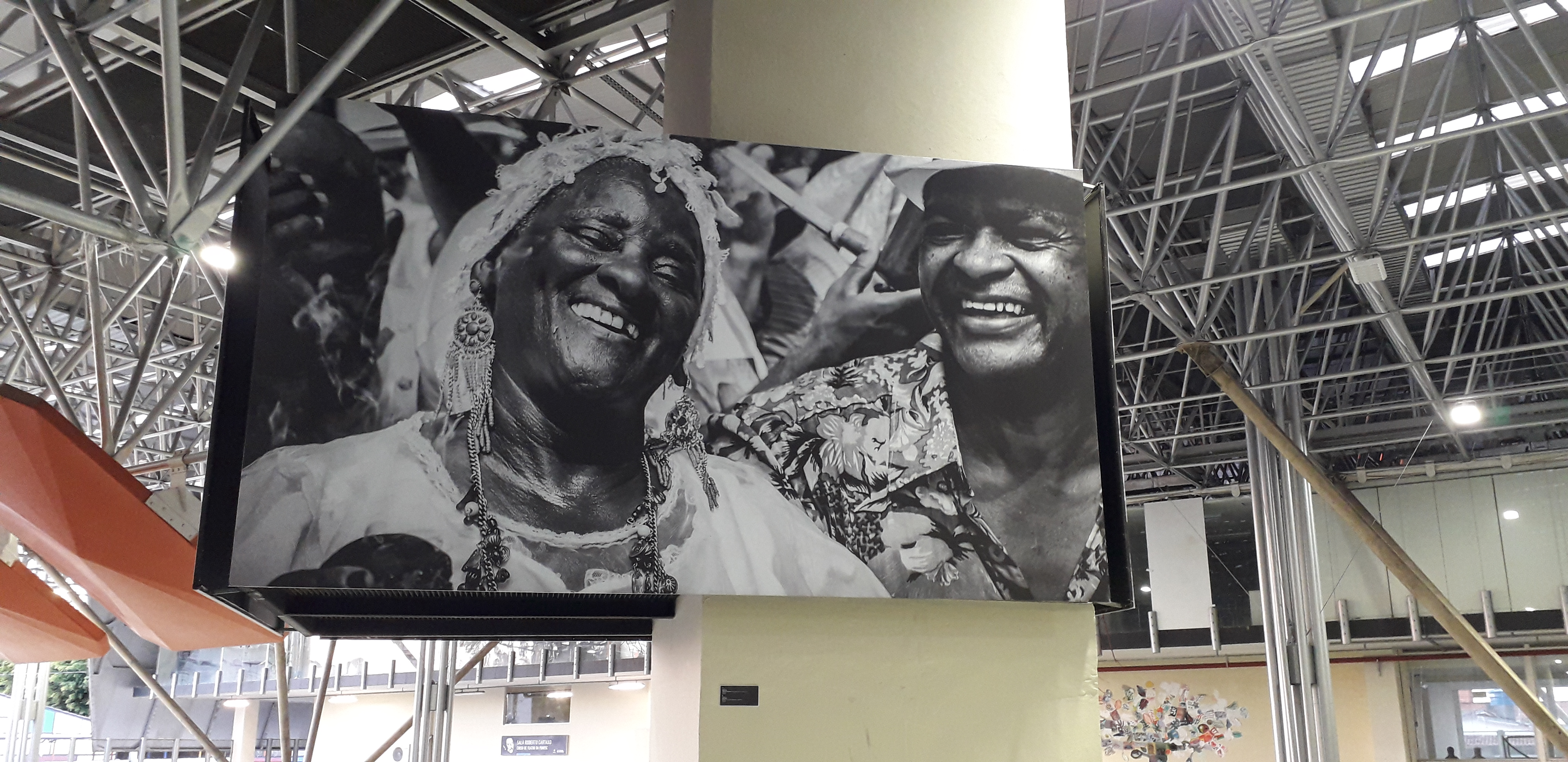
cultural space of João Pessoa

In its geographical structure, the Cultural Space was built on a slope, in a block of approximately 48,000m² (350m x 140m) - surrounded by the streets Severino Alves Aires (to the north), Governor José Gomes da Silva (to the south), Wandick Figueiras (to the east ) and Deputy Jáder Medeiros (to the West).

The coverage of the space is "Unique", and was called "Asa Branca". At the Central Nucleus a repository of knowledge “How to make seeds to germinate: next to the earth”. Underground. . “Between Asa Branca and the ground” Ground floor and Mezzanines.

In its structure there are several precepts of modern architecture: Free plan, interior-exterior communication, horizontal openings, volumetric simplicity, rationality, etc. The structure, a strong element and almost always a highlight in the projects of architect Sérgio Bernardes, is once again highlighted in the Funesc project.

== Structure ==
The space has a total area of 22,978 m^{2} (247,330 sq ft) and houses The João Pessoa Convention and Fair Center, which has an adequate infrastructure for business tourism. There are six spaces that are divided into: square, theater, art gallery, museum - The José Lins do Rego Museum, cinema, one of which is an arena, art gallery, auditoriums, support rooms, service area, marketing and cocktail, two large mezzanines for exhibitions and a covered square with a capacity for up to 15 thousand people.

In the Cultural Space, the Paulo Pontes Theater may not be the largest, but it is certainly one of João Pessoa's main theaters. The theater is the stage for several shows: Performing arts performances, shows, dances, and others. The place is organized with a pleasant atmosphere.

=== Planetarium ===
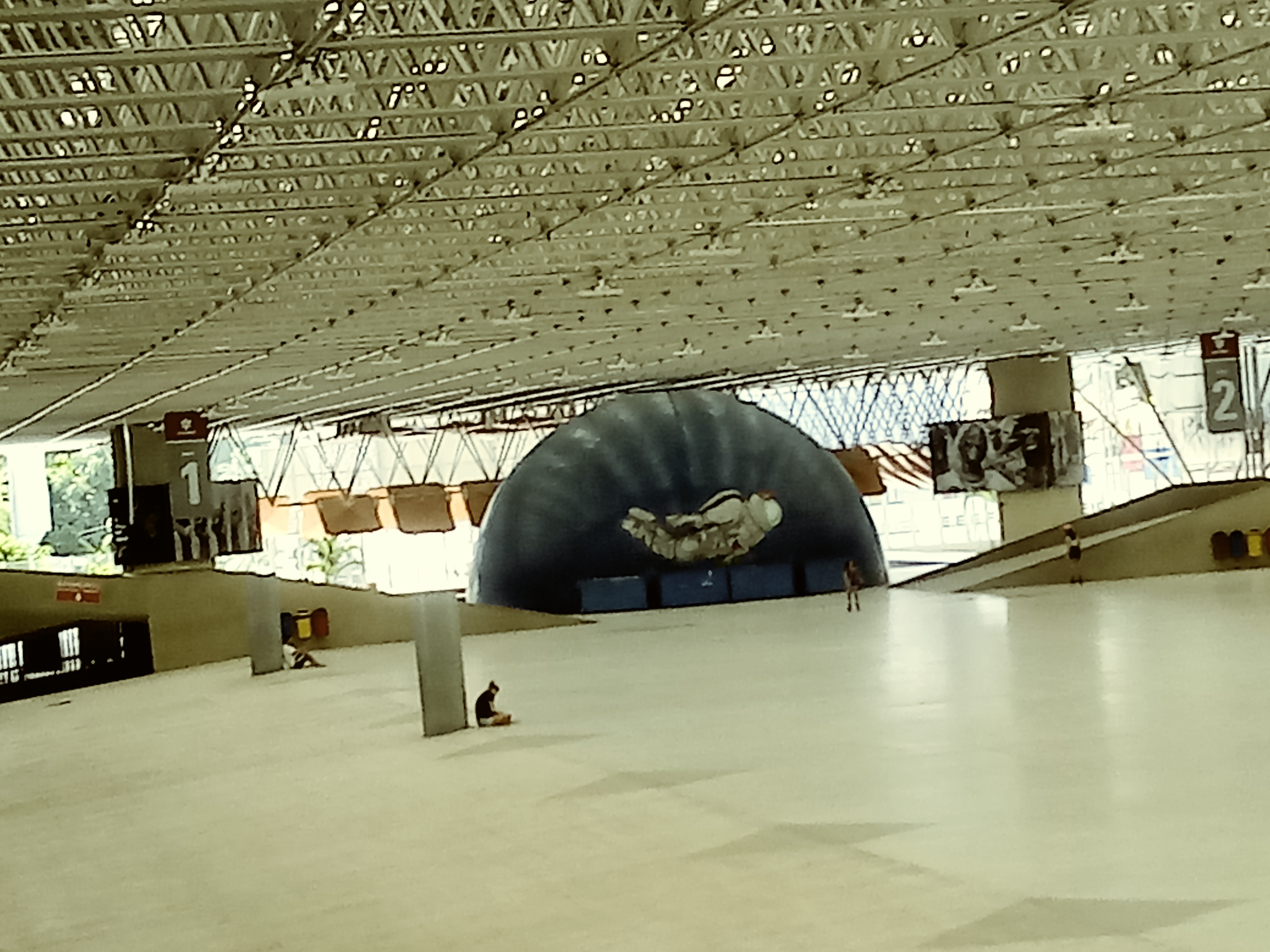
Planetarium of the cultural space

Space also has an immense planetarium. A pioneer in the Northeast and within the 12.5 m diameter dome, Zeiss SpaceMaster projects 6,000 stars and 78 constellations; in addition to the Solar System, nebulous galaxies, the sky from anywhere in the world and the four seasons. The Planetarium is one of the biggest attractions of the place, in which it attracts a large number of people who seek to observe the Solar System and also the Sky from all over the planet.

=== Library Juarez da Gama Batista ===
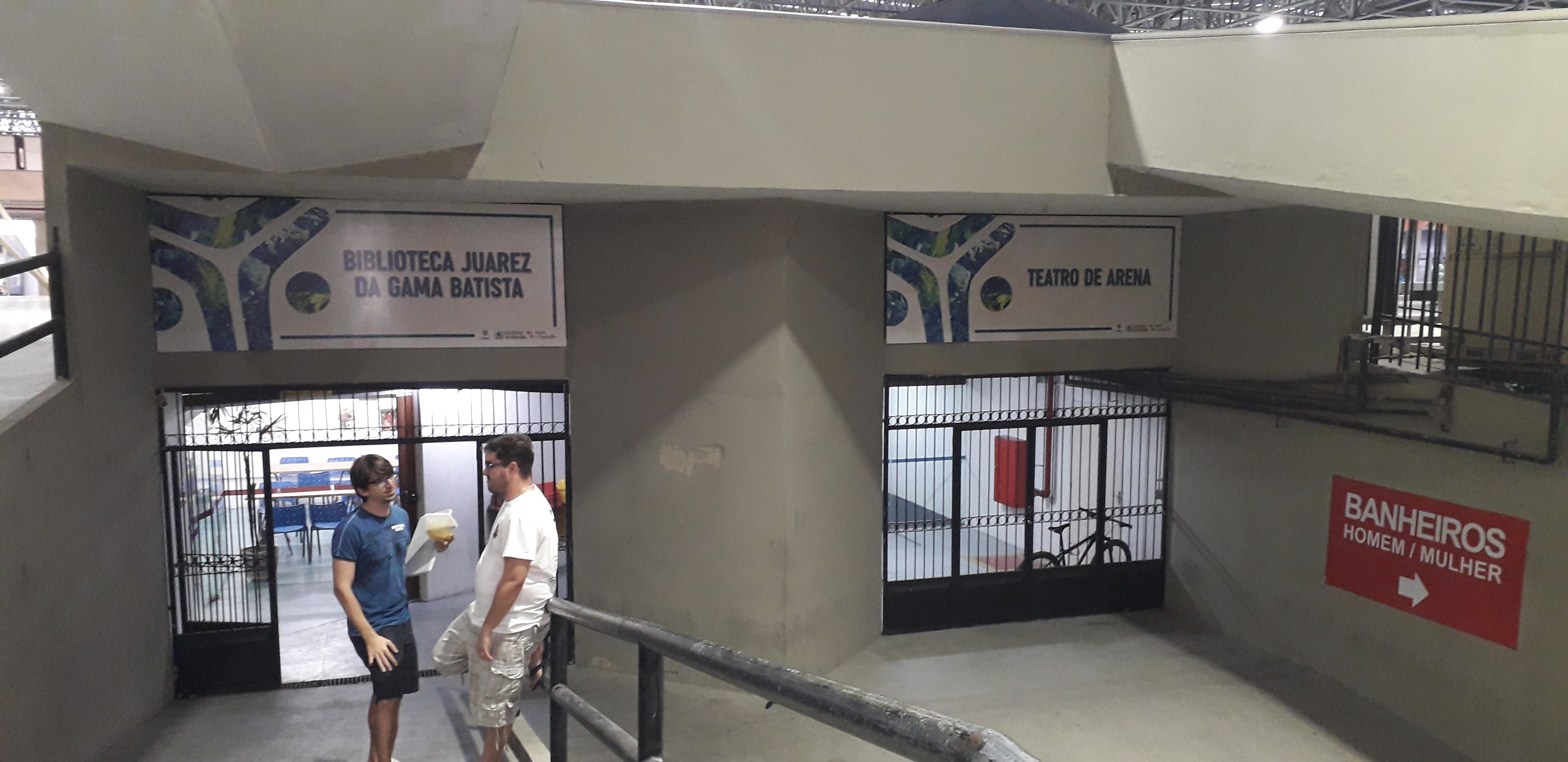
Library Juarez da Gama Batista

The features and characteristics implanted by Bernardes have been preserved for more than 30 years. in the library, the collection with more than 100 thousand books are from publications dating from the time of the discovery of Brazil. The flow of visitors is estimated at 600 people per day. The capacity of the library accommodates 300 people at once distributed on the tables arranged in the hall and in the 36 individual, double and group study booths. And it went through specific cleaning.

Honors Juarez da Gama Batista, It acts as a popular and democratic institution of education, culture, information and knowledge. It has ample space with individual booths and for small groups and collective tables in open space. Today it is the largest public library in Paraíba, with one of the best collections in the Northeast. With 100,000 works, it has a goal of reaching a capacity of 250,000. With the current reform it has a new children's area. Coordinates the State System of Public Libraries, assists municipalities in the State with the implementation of libraries, training and technical support.

=== Cine Bangüê ===
Encourages and disseminates audiovisual production. The Cine Bangüê, has a new and modern installation with a capacity for 160 people. It will show films from around the world, Brazilians and Paraíba, as well as special cinema and video shows, its program will be curated by a group. The audience will have access to cinematographic works that are not available in traditional theaters of cinema. In the training area, it works in partnership with the Centro Audiovisual Norte-Nordeste (Canne), taking courses for professionals in the field

=== Anthenor Navarro Music School ===
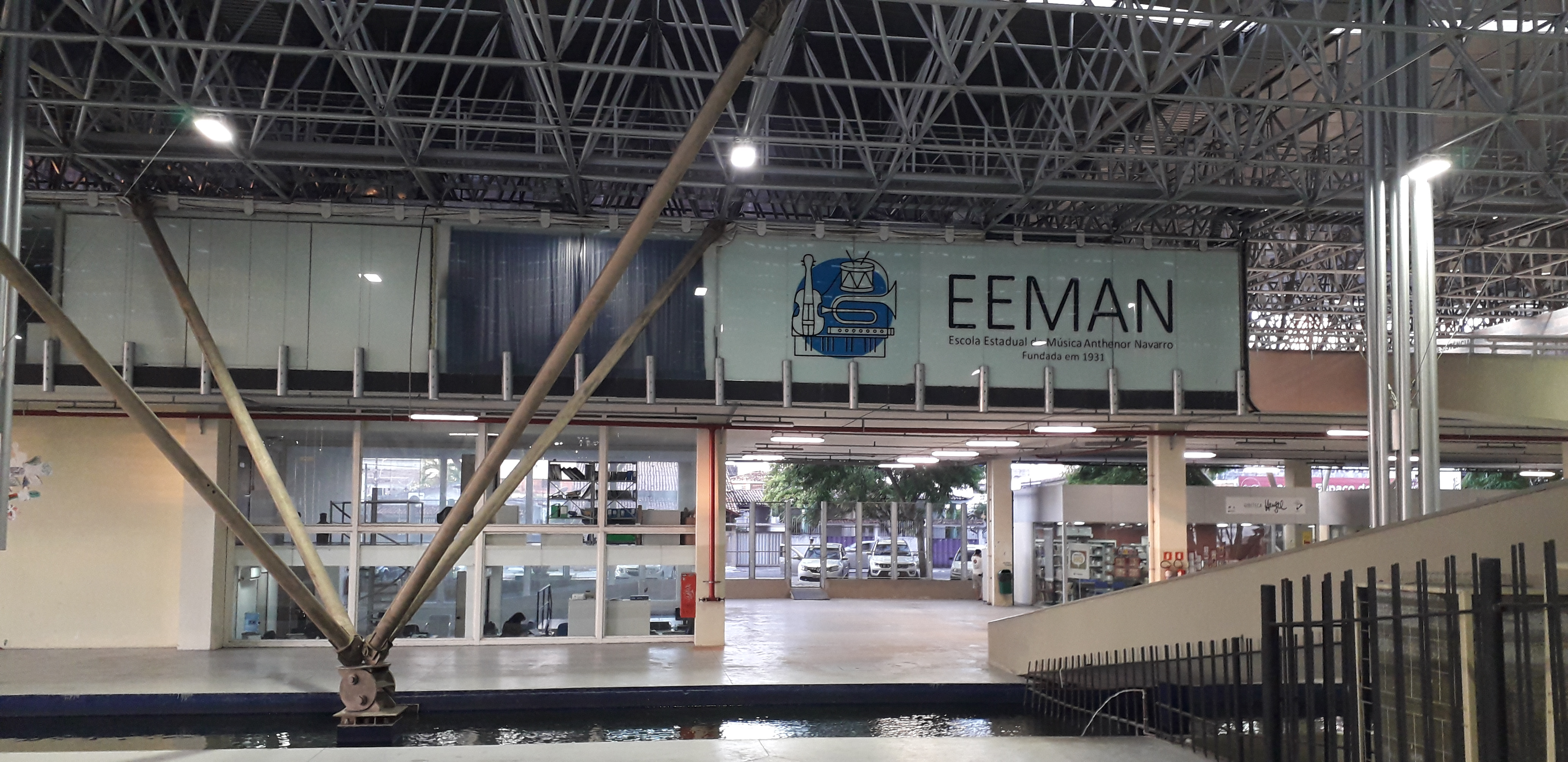
Anthenor Navarro Music School

The Anthenor Navarro State School of Music (EEMAN) is a reference and tradition in the field of music education in the state of Paraíba. Founded by the Paraíba maestro Gazzi de Sá in mid 1931, which was a reference educator in music education in the country, the school was for a long time the only top-level music school in PB. It worked in several spaces and buildings until arriving at the Espaço Cultural José Lins do Rego, in which, over the years, it has played a notorious role in teaching and learning music.

It was in 1952 that the institution was integrated into the State Government, taking in his name a fair tribute to the politician, music lover and great supporter of the school at the time of Gazzi de Sá. In the Cultural Space, since 1983, integrating the first regional teaching management of the State Secretariat of Education, Science and Technology Da Paraíba.

It remains one of the greatest references in music education in Brazil. With more than 1,700 students enrolled, from 6 months of age, it follows taking its flag of resistance firmly, always looking for new horizons to contribute to strengthening the culture of our state.

=== Arena Theater ===
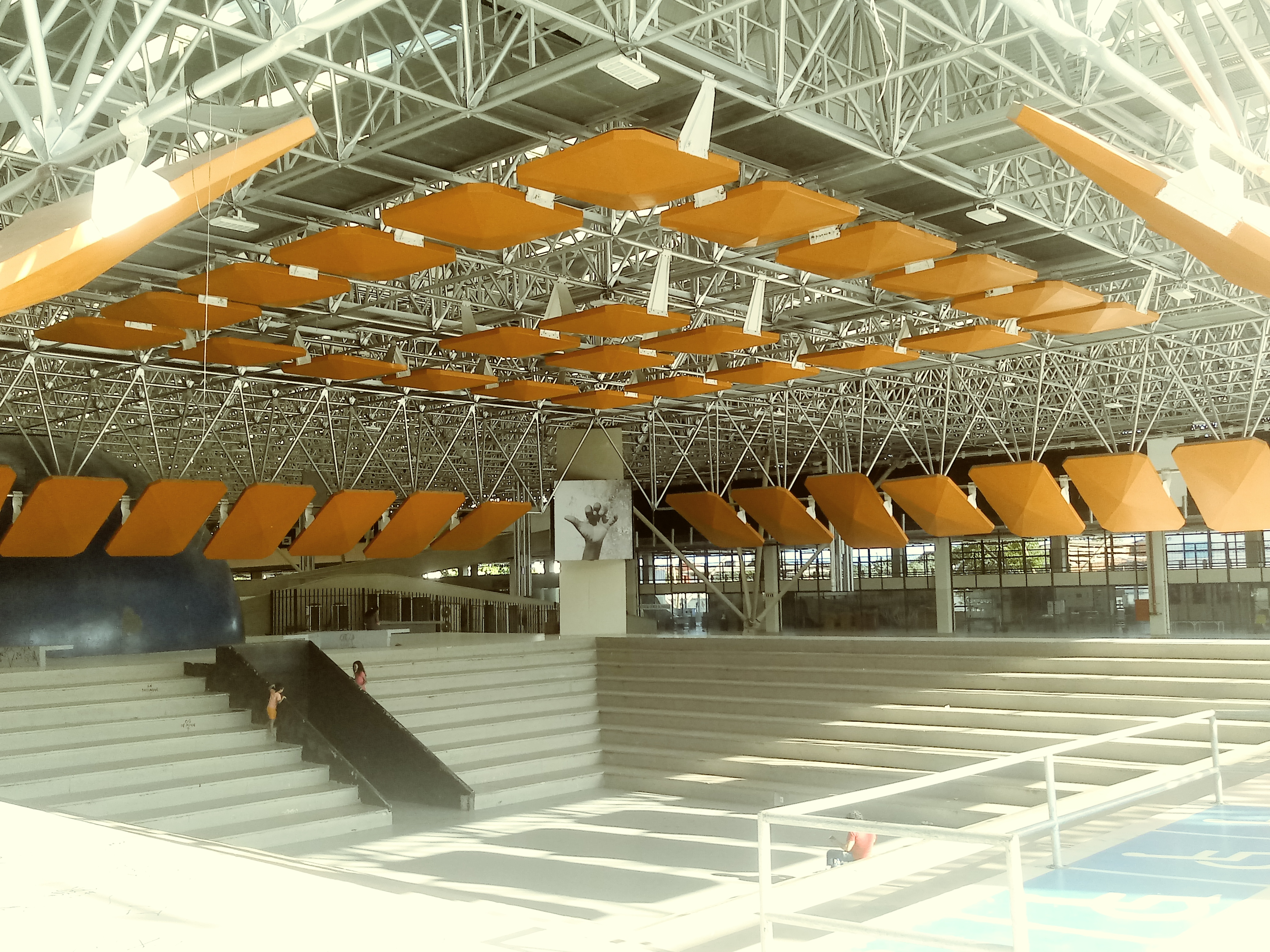
Leonardo da Nóbrega Arena Theater

Although known only as Arena Theater, the space located on the west side of the José Lins do Rego Cultural Space (behind the Planetarium) is called Leonardo Nóbrega, in honor of the Paraíba theaterman who died in 1997.

=== Paulo Pontes Theater ===
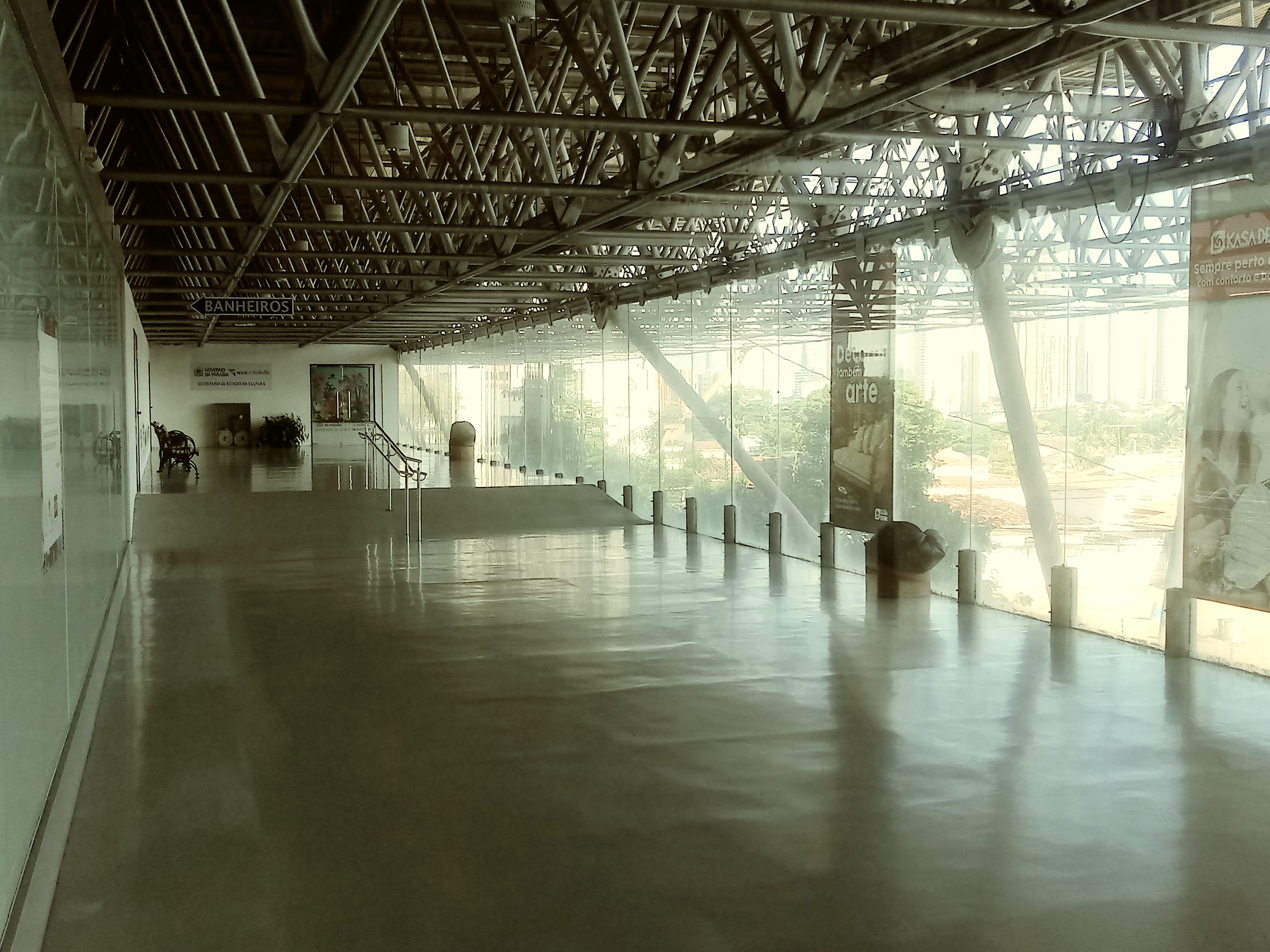
view of Paulo Pontes Theater

It receives the most important performances staged in the country with a capacity for 660 people, it is a great reference in the State. It is open to civil society events, institutions in general, cultural producers in the world, Brazil and the State of Paraíba. It has a fixed calendar of activities, in the area of theater, music, dance, literature, circus, through a continuous program of children's, adult and alternative shows with cutting-edge modern structure.

=== Archidy Picado Galery ===
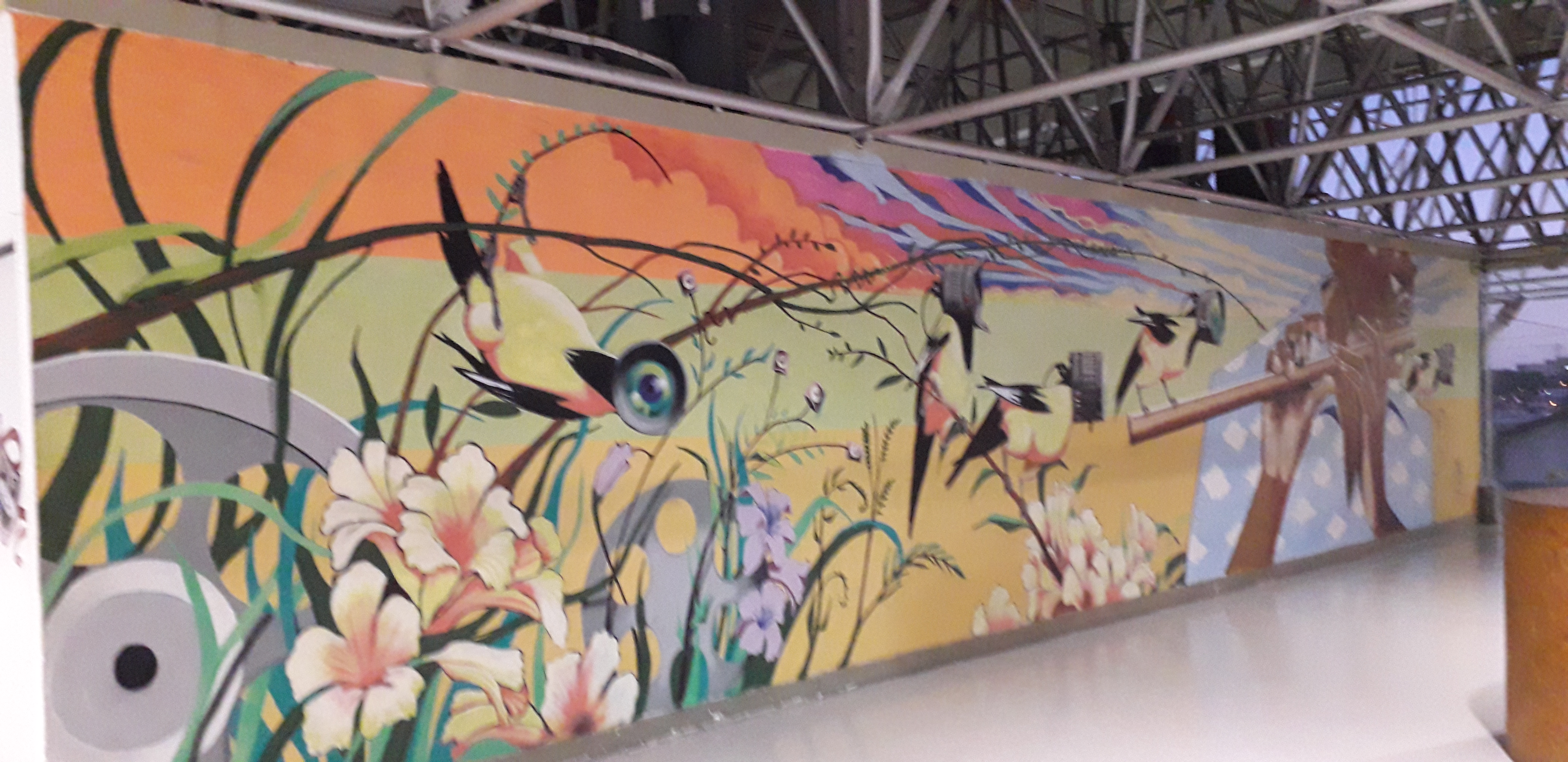
José Lins do Rego cultural space

It is underground, allowing access to different forms of expressions and languages in the production of visual arts in evidence in Paraíba and Brazil. It is a space specially built to host individual and collective exhibitions, including sculpture, painting, engraving, photography, drawing, installation, and also for holding workshops. Visitation is open, including weekends, works with mediations and educational actions aimed mainly at public school students. It has a collection of 130 works of art, by Brazilian and foreign artists who explore various techniques.

=== José Siqueira Musical Research and Documentation Center ===
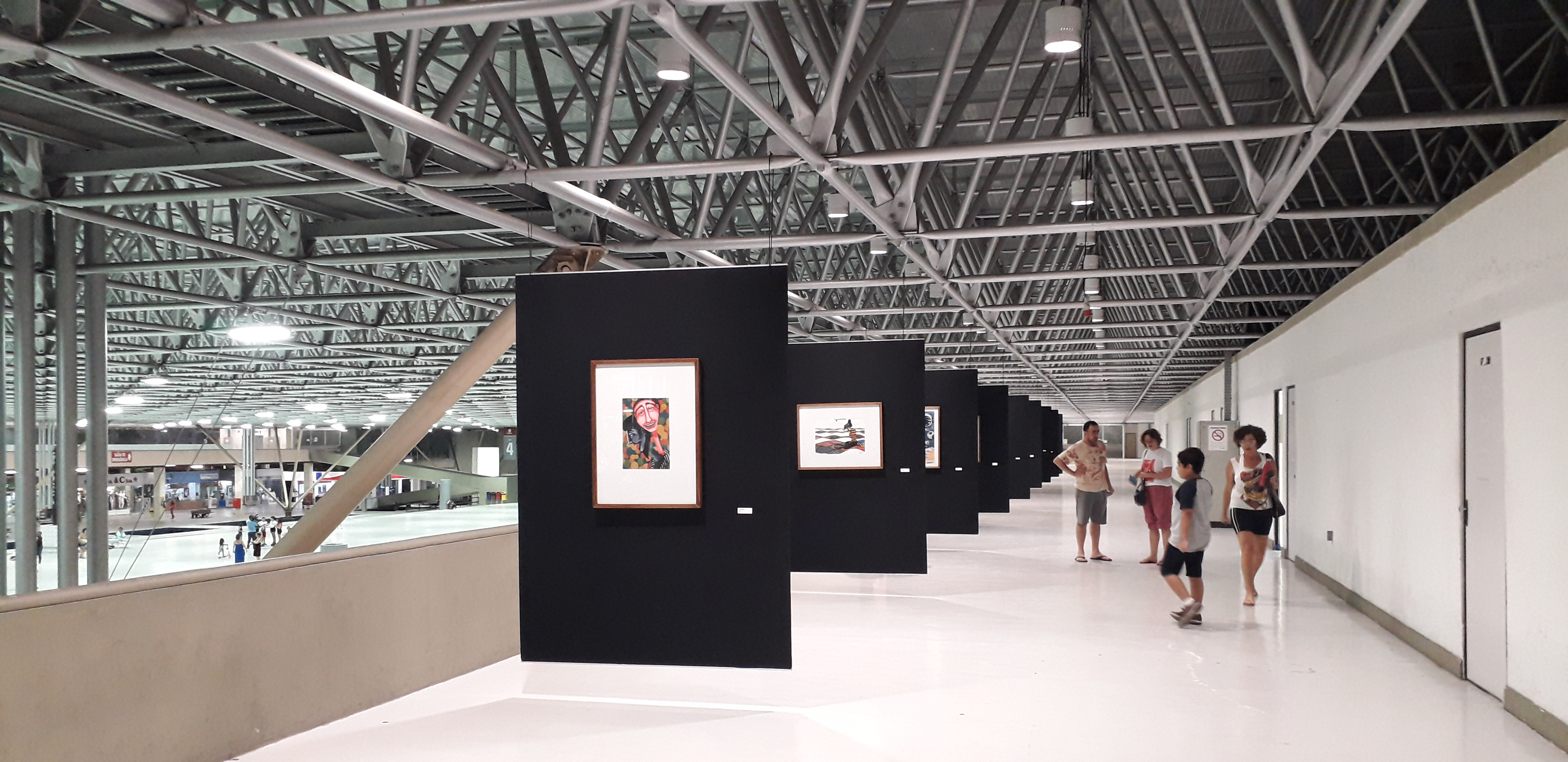
cultural space of João Pessoa

The José Siqueira Documentation and Music Research Center promotes the various musical aspects produced by Singers, Composers, Musicians and Interpreters of Paraíbana, Regional, National and world song. The styles that make up the collection of the Music Research Center are: Popular, Bandistic, Sacred, Classical, Alternative, Choirs and Festivals.

The Musical Research Center has a diversified collection containing photographs (black and white, color) and negatives of events promoted by FUNESC and other institutions. Its collection consists of the maintenance of a Hemeroteca (clippings from historical newspapers), Classical scores by Brazilian and foreign authors; Books on the musical history of Brazil, Latin American and European, LPs, CDs and DVDs. Created by Musicologist Domingos de Azevedo Ribeiro who founded in 1987 the Center for Documentation and Music Research honoring the Musician and also from Paraíba “José Siqueira”, I did not imagine that the growth of this center would be so important for the memory of local, state, regional, national and international music. The Center pays homage to the musician José Siqueira - from Paraíba, born in the city of Conceição do Piancó, in 1907.

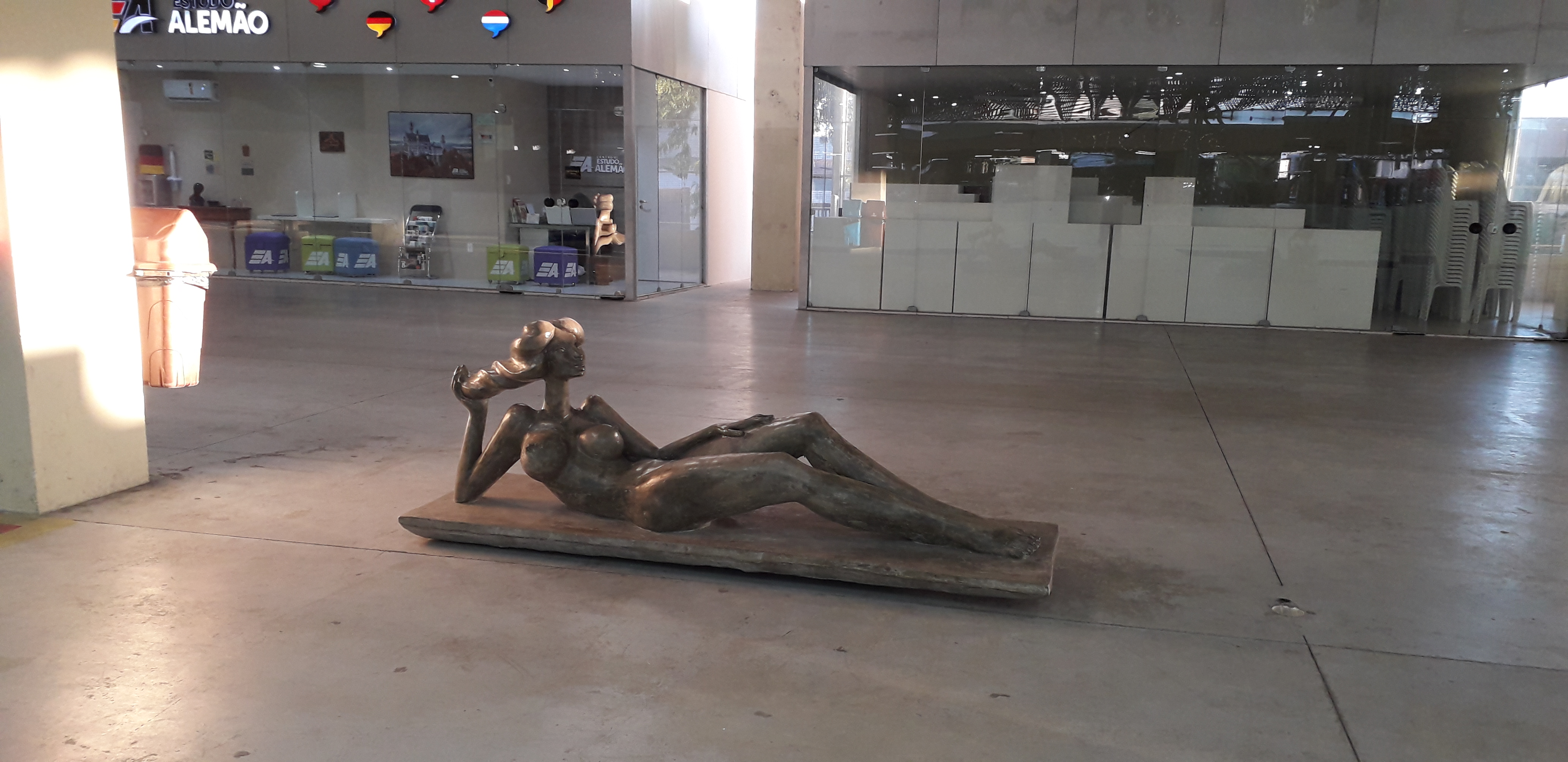
sculptures of cultural space of João Pessoa

He joined the Military School Symphonic Band in Rio de Janeiro. He studied at the National Institute of Music, where he graduated in composition and conducting. In 1967, he created the Chamber Orchestra of Brazil. José Siqueira is also the founder of some entities such as the Order of Musicians of Brazil, Unions and Club Discs. He was a founding member of the Brazilian Academy of Music and Brazilian Academy. of Arts and Professor of harmony at the School of Music of the National Institute of Music. Conducted in the United States the Radio Symphony Orchestra.

In the Soviet Union, he conducted the USSR Symphony Orchestra and the Moscow Philharmonic Orchestra. In Warsaw and Vienna he was a member of Jurisdiction of Composition and Regency. The CDPM is currently coordinated by musician Pedro Osmar Gomes Coutinho. the Musical Research Center is undergoing a renovation of its material, documentary and cultural structure to adapt and renew its collection. To this end, it has a Campaign to receive donations of CDs, LPs, DVDs, Sheet Music and Books related to the production of Paraíbana music.

=== Special School of Music Juarez Johnson ===
It is the first music school in Brazil dedicated exclusively to students with disabilities, has a multifunctional team including musicians, speech therapist, therapist occupational, psychologist, physiotherapist and nurse. Its mission is social inclusion and through musicalization for piano, violin, cello and soon percussion of children and youth with Down's Syndrome, Autism, Asperger's Syndrome, mutism, hydrocephalus, among others. It caters to children and young people, aged from one

=== José Lins do Rego Museum ===
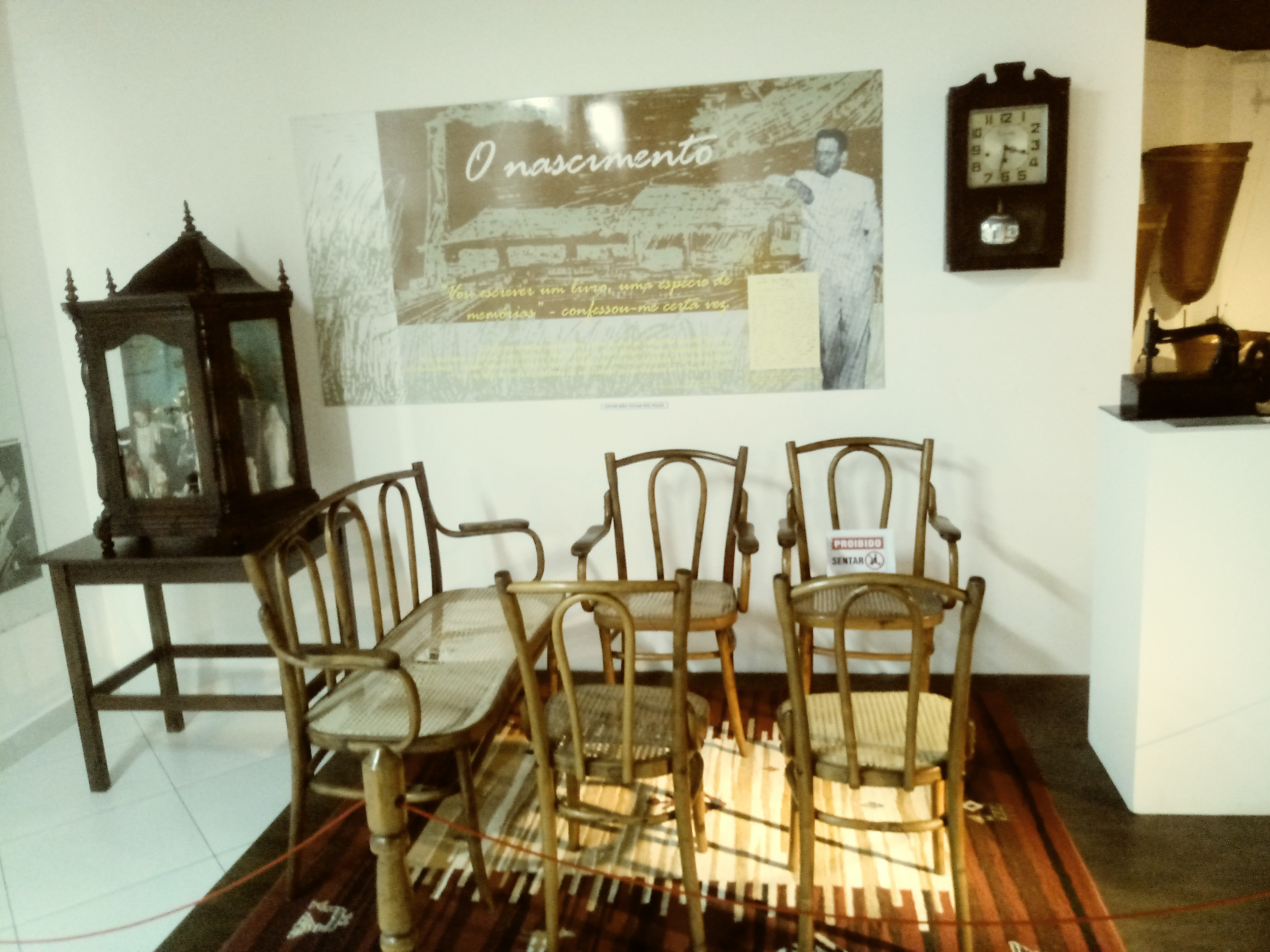
José Lins do Rego Museum

A place dedicated to the writer José Lins do Rêgo Cavalcanti, from Paraíba chosen to give the Cultural Space its name. The José Lins do Rêgo Museum gathers more than 5,000 volumes, cataloged and computerized, from the bibliographic collection of the writer. They are books, documents, letters, manuscripts of works that ended in books and stories, kept in the private library of the writer and that are gathered in the museum for public knowledge.

The entire collection is enriched with canvases, photographs, letters, commendations and personal objects of the writer, such as the family sewing machine, where the layette of José Lins, illustrious son of João and Dona Amélia do Rego Cavalcanti, born on the day June 3, 1901, at Engenho Corredor, Paraíba municipality of Pilar. José Lins do Rego started his studies in Itabaiana and graduated in law from the Faculty of Recife. He took up residence in Rio de Janeiro, where he died on September 12, 1957, at the age of 56. His literary production consists of 12 novels, a memoir, chronicle books and children's literature. Among the most widely read books are Menino de Engenho and Fogo Morto.

The José Lins do Rego museum receives colleges and the general public, with guided tours and presentation of films. It offers support and follow-up to research on the work of José Lins do Rego and holds temporary exhibitions, according to the cultural calendar. It opened on March 19, 1985.

=== Gibiteca Henfil ===
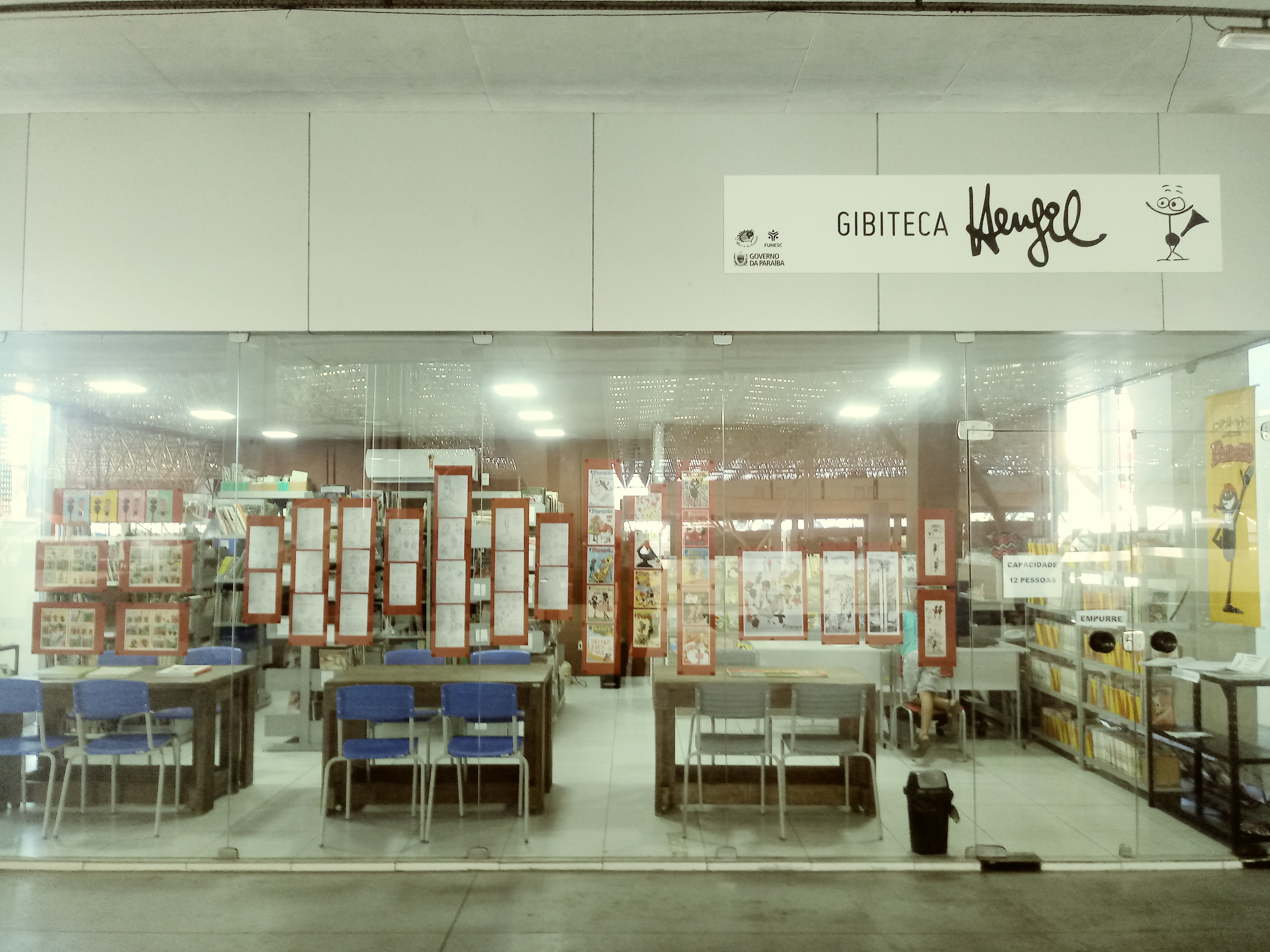
Gibiteca Henfil

The Gibiteca Henfil came up with the extension project of the Federal University of Paraíba (UFPB), brand to make the inventory and conservation of the collection, as well as making it once again accessible to all comic lovers. Its collection includes thousands of national and international comic books and hundreds of fanzines, complete collections from the 1980s and older ones totaling ten thousands copies. A curiosity of the place is that, those interested in donating comics in good condition and exhibiting their copyrighted works are welcome. The gibiteca besides spreading unknown artists, makes people know more about the universe of HQ's. On the other hand, she encourages the reading of comics in children and adults who come to the place.

=== Science Station ===
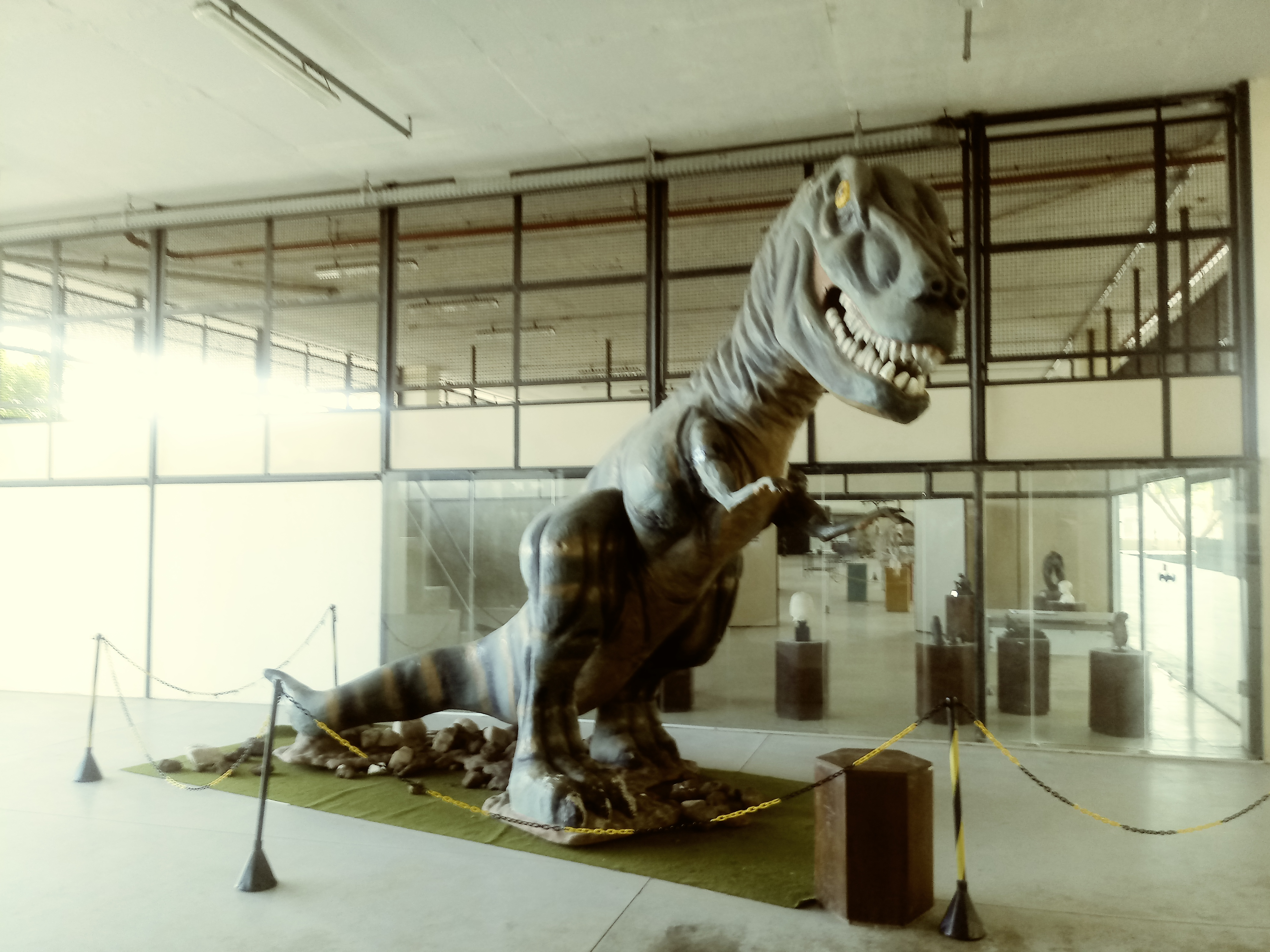
Science Station of cultural space

There are more than 700 square meters reserved for visiting students who want to know, in practice, experiments in the areas of physics, chemistry, biology, mathematics and geography. The Paraíba Science Station was inaugurated on March 30, 1990, during the second government of Tarcísio Burity. At the time, it was the country's second station with a scientific collection. It was created to popularize and demystify scientific and technological experiences in an accessible language.

One of the first attractions of the Science Station was the traveling exhibition about Sputinik, the first artificial satellite on Earth, launched by the Soviet Union on October 4, 1957. They were photos provided by the Russian Embassy, which recorded the first trip to the Moon, and a replica of the artificial satellite launched into space. In addition to the laboratories, the Station exhibits curiosities from Paraíba. They are prehistoric replicas of Pedra do Ingá and its rupestrian inscriptions, from the footprints of the Valley of Dinosaurs, existing in the municipality of Sousa. In the sector of permanent exhibitions, there are human and whale skeletons, in addition to rocks and minerals existing in Paraíba.

Estação Ciência do Brasil has monitored laboratory sectors in the areas of biology, physics, mathematics, chemistry and astronomy. In the sector of permanent exhibitions, skeletons of whales and prehistoric animals, replicas of Ingá stone, sculptures and Renaissance paintings.

== FUNESC ==
FUNESC is a complex built to concentrate cultural initiatives and its structure provides adequate conditions for various activities in the cultural field, be it dance and music courses, symphonic orchestra rehearsals and art festivals, in addition to permanent music and dance schools.

The Cultural Space It is open to the public for visitation every day from 8 am to 10 pm. Concerts, plays, exhibitions and shows are always advertised in the media. It has easy access by bus, being able to reach the place by any line that passes through avenue Epitácio Pessoa.
