= Gogarty =

Gogarty is an Irish surname. Notable people with the surname include:

- Daniel Gogarty (born 1996), Canadian soccer player
- Deirdre Gogarty (born 1969), Irish boxer
- Dermot St. John Gogarty (born 1908), Irish architect
- Henry Aloysius Gogarty (1884–1931), Irish bishop
- James Gogarty (1890–1921), Irish revolutionary
- Oliver St. John Gogarty (1878–1957), Irish poet
- Paddy Gogarty, Irish Gaelic footballer
- Paul Gogarty (born 1968), Irish politician

== See also ==
- Fogarty
