= Giacomo Joyce =

1968 posthumous work by James Joyce

- First edition
- Author: James Joyce
- Language: English
- Publisher: Faber & Faber
- Publication date: 1968
- Media type: Print (Hardback & Paperback)
- Pages: 16 pages
- Preceded by: Stephen Hero (1944)

Giacomo Joyce is a posthumously published work by Irish writer James Joyce. It was published by Faber and Faber from sixteen handwritten pages by Joyce. The text is a free-form love poem that tracks the waxing and waning of Joyce's infatuation with one of his students in Trieste.

== Writing and publication ==
Giacomo Joyce was written in Trieste between 1911 and 1914 shortly before the publication of A Portrait of the Artist as a Young Man. The original manuscript contains fifty fragments transcribed onto eight large sheets of sketching paper held within a blue school notebook. It was written in Joyce's "best calligraphic hand". The manuscript was left with his brother Stanislaus when Joyce moved to Zurich in 1915. The text of Giacomo Joyce is quoted at length in Richard Ellmann's 1959 biography, James Joyce, but it wasn't until 1968 that it was published in its entirety.

Giacomo Joyce contains several passages that appear in Joyce’s subsequent works including A Portrait of the Artist as a Young Man, Ulysses, and Exiles. Some passages were borrowed verbatim while others were reworked. According to Ellmann, this reflects a decision on Joyce’s part to "pillage rather than publish" Giacomo. Writer and critic, Michel Delville, asserts that the "explicitly autobiographical character of the poem and the scabrousness of the subject eventually prevented Joyce from publishing"; adding that Joyce may have found it "aesthetically embarrassing as well as biographically compromising".

== Analysis and interpretation ==
The hero of Giacomo Joyce is undoubtedly Joyce himself, and within the text Giacomo is referred to as "Jamesy" and "Jim". There is also a reference to Joyce's wife Nora. Additionally, "Giacomo" is the Italian form of the author's forename, James. According to Helen Barolini, the use of the name is an ironic allusion to the "name of another (but more successful) lover, Giacomo Casanova." The "dark lady" at the center of Giacomo is identified by Ellmann as Amalia Popper. The daughter of Leopoldo Popper, a Jewish businessman who ran a shipping company in Trieste, Amalia was tutored by Joyce between 1908 and 1909. Citing various biographic discrepancies, other scholars dispute that the heroine of Giacomo is Amalia Popper, rather they say she is most likely an amalgam of several of Joyce's students in Trieste.

John McCourt describes Giacomo Joyce as "a mixture of several genres — part biography, part personal journal, part lyrical poetry... part prose narrative". It represents the liminal period when Joyce was transitioning from the poetry of Chamber Music to the prose of Ulysses. Several of the shorter fragments in the text closely resemble Ezra Pound's "In a Station of the Metro" which leads Delville to connect it to Imagist poetry, a movement which was well underway at the time of Joyce's writing.

== Related works ==
In 1976, German artist Paul Wunderlich produced ten multicolored heliographs illustrating Giacomo Joyce. Wunderlich's illustrations are a post-war interpretation of a pre-war text "which he reads as deeply disturbing intimations of the Holocaust".

== Works cited ==
- Ellmann, Richard (1968). Introduction. Giacomo Joyce. By Joyce, James. London: Faber and Faber.
- Delville, Michel (1998). The American Prose Poem : Poetic Form and the Boundaries of Genre. Gainesville: University Press of Florida. ISBN 9780813021447.
- Barolini, Helen (2003). "The End of My Giacomo Joyce Affair". Southwest Review. 88 (2/3). Southern Methodist University: 248–261. JSTOR 43472628.
