= Pureza =

Pureza (Spanish, Portuguese "Purity") may refer to:

== Geography ==
- Pureza station, a station on the Manila Light Rail Transit System Line 2
- Pureza Street, a short street located in Santa Mesa district in Manila, Philippines
- Pureza, Rio Grande do Norte a municipality in the state of Rio Grande do Norte in the Northeast region of Brazil

== Other ==
- Pureza (novel), a 1937 novel by José Lins do Rego
- Pureza, a 1940 film based on the novel
- Pureza, a character in The Adventures of Pureza: Queen of the Riles, a 2011 Filipino comedy film
