= Mary Ellmann =

American literary critic and feminist theorist (1921–1989)

Mary Ellmann (née Donoghue) (1921–1989) was an American writer and literary critic. Journals in which she wrote included The New York Review of Books, The Nation, Encounter, The Atlantic Monthly, Commentary, The New Republic, the New Statesman and The American Scholar. Her 1969 book, Thinking About Women is called one of the significant texts in early feminist theory. Her career was cut short by illness and death.

== Literary criticism ==
Ellmann is particularly noted for her book of essays, Thinking About Women (1968), which discusses the evolution of the representation of femininity in British and American literature, exhibiting sexual analogies and stereotypes from the texts and contrasting criticism by male and female authors. The literary historian Mary Eagleton cited Ellmann's book as one of two "significant texts" in early feminist theory. The work has been widely cited for its introduction of the concept "phallic criticism" as applied to writers of both sexes. In a review of academic studies of gender, Mary Poovey described Thinking About Women as an example of the "earliest U.S. incarnation" of feminist literary criticism, which, "with the excitement of pioneers discovering virgin territory... helped make writing about women academically acceptable."

== Personal life ==
Ellmann was born in Newburyport, Massachusetts. She attended the University of Massachusetts and Yale University, receiving a PhD in English from Yale. In 1949, she married the literary critic Richard Ellmann. The couple had three children, Stephen, Maud, and Lucy.

In December 1969, Ellmann suffered a cerebral hemorrhage leaving her unable to walk for the rest of her life. She died from a second hemorrhage on June 3, 1989, in Oxford, England.

== Publications ==
- Mary Ellmann, Thinking About Women (New York: Harcourt, 1968).
