= Lucy Ellmann =

American writer

Lucy Ellmann FRSL
- Born: 18 October 1956 (age 70); Evanston, Illinois, U.S.
- Citizenship: American; British
- Education: Falmouth School of Art (Foundation degree, 1975); University of Essex (BA, 1980); Courtauld Institute of Art (MA, 1981)
- Spouse: Todd McEwen
- Relatives: Richard Ellmann (father); Mary Ellmann (mother)
- Writing career
- Language: English
- Notable work: Ducks, Newburyport (2019)

Lucy Ellmann (born 18 October 1956) is an American-born British novelist based in Edinburgh, Scotland.

== Biography ==
Her first book, Sweet Desserts, won the Guardian Fiction Prize. She is the daughter of the American biographer and literary critic Richard Ellmann and of the feminist literary critic Mary Ellmann. She is the sister of the critic Maud Ellmann. She is married to the American writer Todd McEwen. Her fourth novel, Dot in the Universe, was longlisted for the Orange Prize for Fiction and shortlisted for the Believer Book Award. Her novel, Ducks, Newburyport was short-listed for the Booker Prize in 2019. It won the 2019 Goldsmiths Prize and the 2020 James Tait Black Prize for Fiction.

Ellmann lectured and led seminars in Creative Writing at the University of Kent between September 2009 and July 2010.

Ellmann has been recognised with honours and fellowships, including the Royal Literary Fund; Queen Margaret University 2017/18; University of Dundee 2011/12; Queen Margaret University 2005–07; and been a Hawthornden Fellow and Hawthornden fellowship residence at Hawthornden Castle.

She was elected a Fellow of the Royal Society of Literature (FRSL) in 2025.

== Notable works ==
- Sweet Desserts (1988)
- Varying Degrees of Hopelessness (1991)
- The Spy Who Caught a Cold (screenplay, 1995)
- Man or Mango? A Lament (1999)
- Dot in the Universe (2003)
- Doctors & Nurses (2006)
- Mimi (2013)
- Ducks, Newburyport (2019)
- Things Are Against Us (2021)

== Sources ==
- "Ellmann, Lucy 1956–", Encyclopedia.com, Contemporary Authors, New Revision Series Retrieved October 8, 2018.
