= Oliver St. John Gogarty =

Irish physician, writer and politician (1878–1957)

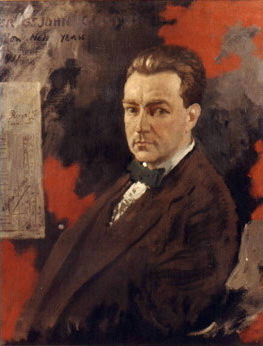
- Gogarty as painted in 1911 by William Orpen
- Born: 17 August 1878; Rutland Square, Dublin, Ireland
- Died: 22 September 1957 (aged 79); New York City, United States
- Occupations: Author, poet, memoirist, physician/surgeon, politician, athlete
- Spouse: Martha Duane Gogarty (m. 1906)
- Children: 3, including Dermot
- Writing career
- Notable work: As I Was Going Down Sackville Street (1937)
- Movement: Irish Literary Renaissance

Senator
- In office 11 December 1922 – 29 May 1936

Personal details
- Party: Cumann na nGaedheal; Fine Gael

Olympic medal record

Art competitions
| Bronze medal – third place | 1924 Paris | Literature |

Oliver Joseph St. John Gogarty (17 August 1878 – 22 September 1957) was an Irish poet, author, otolaryngologist, athlete, politician, and conversationalist. He served as the inspiration for Buck Mulligan in James Joyce's novel Ulysses.

== Life ==
=== Early life ===
Gogarty was born 17 August 1878 in Rutland Square, Dublin, the eldest child of Henry Gogarty, a well-to-do Dublin physician, and Margaret Gogarty (née Oliver), the daughter of a Galway mill owner. Three siblings (Henry, Mary, and Richard) were born later. Gogarty's father, himself the son of a medical doctor, had been educated at Trinity College Dublin and owned two fashionable homes in Dublin, which set the Gogartys apart from other Irish Catholic families at that time and allowed them access to the same social circles as the Protestant Ascendancy.

Gogarty was sent by his father to the Christian Brothers' O'Connell School (North Richmond Street, Dublin), which he happily attended, 1890–92. When his father died suddenly in 1891, his family then sent him to Mungret College, a boarding school near Limerick. He was unhappy in his new school, and the following year he transferred to Stonyhurst College in Lancashire, England, which he liked a little better, later referring to it as "a religious jail".

Gogarty returned to Ireland in 1896 and boarded at Clongowes Wood College while studying for examinations with the Royal University of Ireland. He was a talented athlete; in England, he had briefly played for the Preston North End FC Reserve, and while at Clongowes he played for the Bohemian FC. He also played on Clongowes's soccer and cricket elevens. His extracurricular interests, which also included cycling and drinking, prevented him from being an attentive student, and in 1898 he switched to the medical school at Trinity College, having failed eight of his ten examinations at the Royal.

=== University days ===
As one of Dublin's "medicos", Gogarty was known to be fond of public pranks and midnight carousing in "the Kips", Dublin's red-light district. He had a talent for humorous and bawdy verse, which quickly made the rounds through the city, and sometimes composed mnemonic lyrics to aid his medical studies. He also enjoyed a highly successful cycling career before being banned from the tracks in 1901 for bad language. Between 1898 and 1901 he rescued at least four people from drowning. He became interested in Irish nationalism after meeting Arthur Griffith in 1899, and contributed propaganda pieces to The United Irishman over subsequent years.

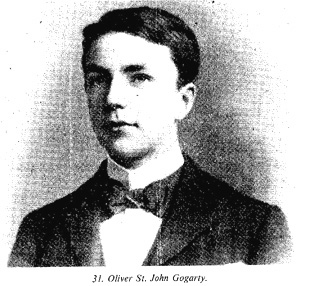
Gogarty in 1897

A serious interest in poetry and literature also began to manifest itself during his years at Trinity. His witty conversation made him a favourite with the dons, particularly John Pentland Mahaffy (formerly the tutor of Oscar Wilde) and Robert Yelverton Tyrrell, and between 1901 and 1903 he won three successive Vice-Chancellor's prizes for verse. In 1900 he made the acquaintance of W. B. Yeats (of whom his mother highly approved) and of George Moore (of whom she did not) and began to frequent Dublin literary circles. He also formed close friendships with other up-and-coming young poets, such as Seumas O'Sullivan and James Joyce. In 1904 he spent two terms at Oxford to compete for the Newdigate Prize, but lost to G.K.A. Bell, the future Bishop of Chichester, who became a friend and frequent correspondent over the next few years.

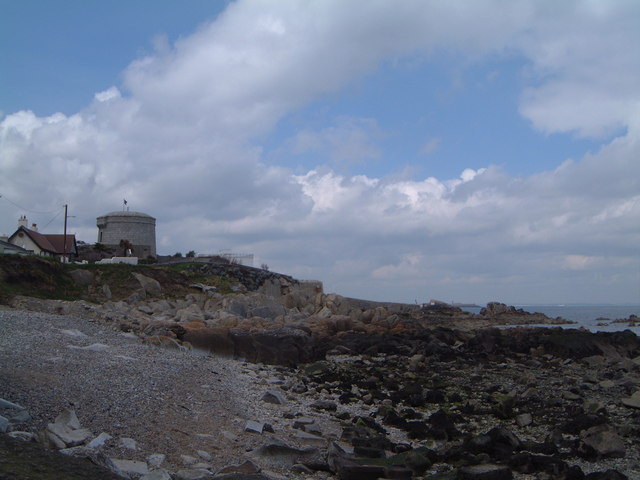
The Tower in Sandycove

Upon returning to Dublin in the summer of 1904, Gogarty made arrangements to rent the Martello Tower in Sandycove. The primary goal of this scheme, as described by Gogarty in a letter to G.K.A. Bell, was to "house the Bard" (i.e. James Joyce), who was without money and required "a year in which to finish his novel". The two friends quarrelled in August, however, and Joyce either failed to move in or left shortly after doing so. Joyce briefly took up residence in the Tower the following month, together with Gogarty and his Oxford friend Samuel Chenevix Trench (a setup which later provided inspiration for the opening chapter of Ulysses) but left again after only six days. Forty years later in America, Gogarty attributed Joyce's abrupt departure to an incident in which Trench brandished a loaded revolver after being startled by a nightmare. Joyce and Gogarty corresponded intermittently during the early years of Joyce's continental exile and occasionally planned meetings, but contemporaneous letters from Joyce to his brother reveal deep distrust of Gogarty's motives, and their friendship was never fully renewed. Gogarty made use of the Martello Tower during the following year as a writing retreat and party venue, and officially held the lease until 1925.

In 1904 and 1905 Gogarty published several short poems in the London publication The Venture and in John Eglinton's journal Dana. His name also appeared in print as the renegade priest Fr. Oliver Gogarty in George Moore's 1905 novel The Lake, an occurrence which upset Gogarty's devout mother. In 1905 Gogarty became one of the founding members of Arthur Griffith's Sinn Féin, a non-violent political movement with a plan for Irish autonomy modelled after the Austro-Hungarian dual monarchy.

=== Medical career and family ===
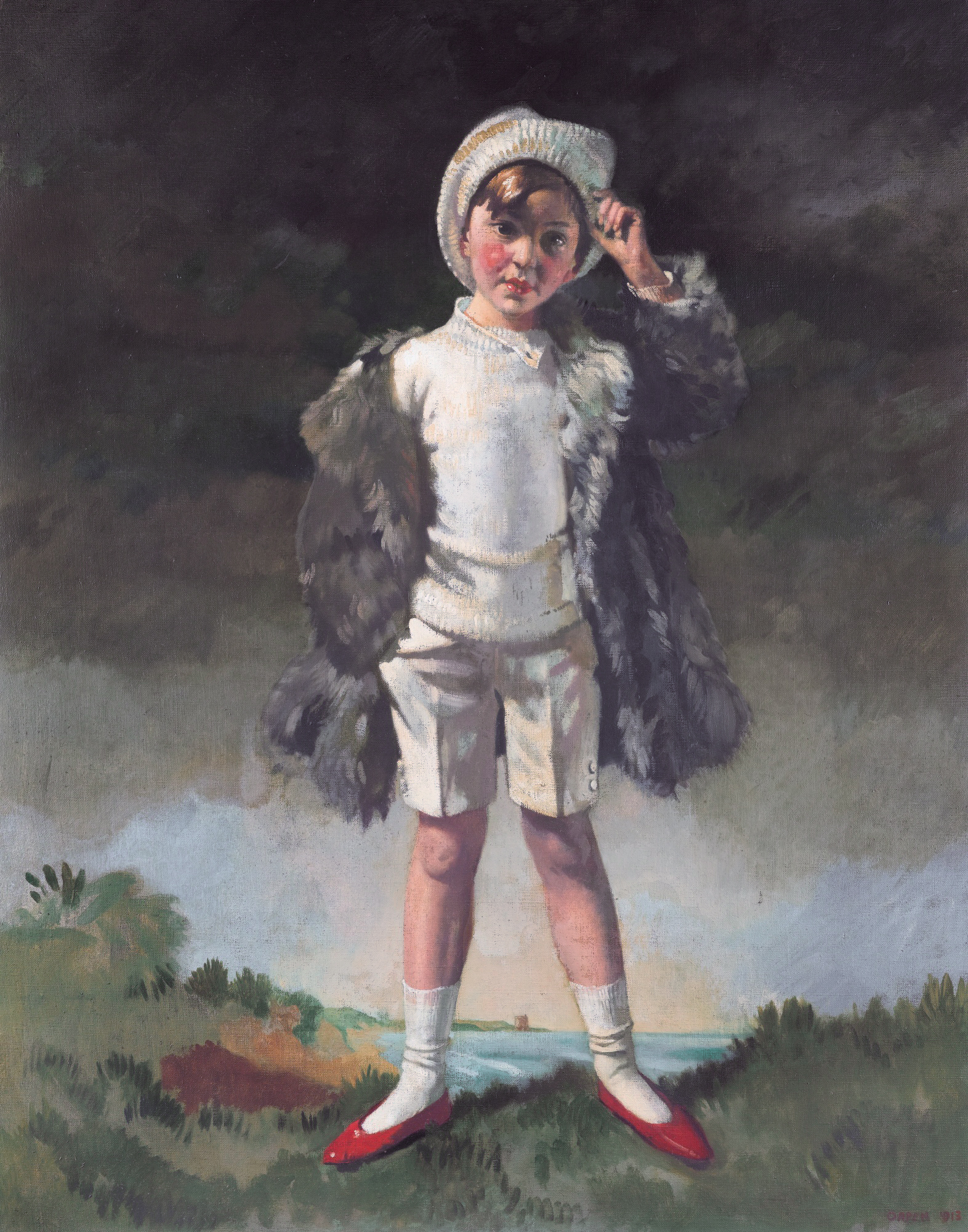
Noll Gogarty, painted by William Orpen

In August 1906, Gogarty married Martha Duane, a girl from a landowning Connemara family. Eager to establish himself with a profession, he passed his final medical examinations in June 1907, several months after the death of his mother. In July 1907 his first son, Oliver Duane Odysseus Gogarty (known as "Noll") was born, and in autumn of that year, Gogarty left for Vienna to finish the practical phase of his medical training. Owing in part to the influence of his mentor, Sir Robert Woods, Gogarty had decided to specialise in otolaryngology, and in Vienna, he studied under Ottokar Chiari, Markus Hajek, and Robert Bárány.

Returning to Dublin in 1908, Gogarty secured a post at Richmond Hospital, and shortly afterwards purchased a house in Ely Place opposite George Moore. Three years later, he joined the staff of the Meath Hospital and remained there for the remainder of his medical career. He became known for flamboyant theatrics in the operating room, including off-the-cuff witticisms and the flinging of recently removed larynxes at the viewing gallery. He also maintained ENT consulting rooms in Ely Place, attracting a number of wealthy clients and attending to less well-off patients for free.

Gogarty and his wife had two more children, Dermot (born 1908) and Brenda (born 1911), and in 1917 Gogarty purchased Renvyle House, a large country house in Renvyle, Connemara, from Caroline Blake. He became a keen motorist during this time, purchasing a succession of automobiles that culminated with a buttercup-coloured Rolls-Royce. During the following decade he was also interested in aviation, earning a pilot's licence and helping to found the Irish Aero Club.

=== Free State Senator ===
As a Sinn Féiner during the Irish War of Independence, Gogarty participated in a variety of anti-Black and Tan schemes, allowing his home to be used as a safe house and transporting disguised IRA volunteers in his car. Following the ratification of the Anglo-Irish Treaty, Gogarty sided with the pro-Treaty government (headed by his close friend Arthur Griffith) and was made a Free State Senator. When Griffith fell ill during the summer of 1922, Gogarty frequently attended his bedside. His death on 12 August 1922 had a profound effect on Gogarty; W.T. Cosgrave later observed that "he was almost mortally wounded when Griffith died, he was so very, very much attached to him." Gogarty carried out Griffith's official autopsy and embalmment and went on to perform the same offices for Michael Collins, another close friend whom Gogarty had often sheltered in his Ely Place home prior to his assassination. It was rumoured that Griffith had been planning to make Gogarty the new Governor-General of the Irish Free State, but in his absence, the post went to Tim Healy.

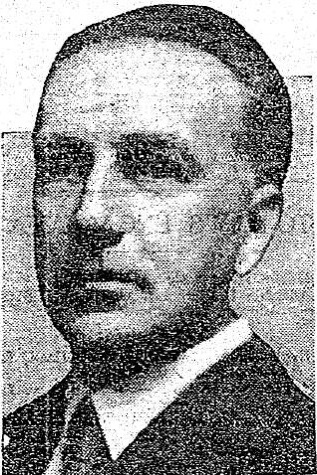
Gogarty in 1922

In November 1922, anti-Treaty IRA commander Liam Lynch issued a general order to his forces to shoot Free State senators. Two months later, Gogarty was kidnapped by a group of anti-Treaty militants, who lured him out of his house and into a waiting car under the pretext of bringing him to visit a sick patient. Gogarty was driven to an empty house near Chapelizod and held under armed guard. Aware that he might be in imminent danger of execution, Gogarty contrived to have himself led out into the garden (purportedly by claiming to be suffering from diarrhoea), where he broke free from his captors and flung himself into the River Liffey; he then swam to shore and delivered himself to the protection of the police barracks in Phoenix Park. In February of that same year, Renvyle was burnt to the ground by anti-Treaty forces. Following these incidents, Gogarty relocated his family and practice to London, where he resided until February 1924. Upon returning to Ireland, he famously released two swans into the Liffey in gratitude for his life.

Gogarty remained a senator until the abolition of the Seanad in 1936, during which time he identified with none of the existing political parties and voted according to his own whims. He believed that Ireland should retain its dominion status in the British Commonwealth so as to "keep with nations who understand that the first principle of freedom is a freedom that does not permit interference with the personal liberties of the citizen". He supported rural electrification schemes, road improvement, reforestation and conservation, prevention of livestock cruelty, and educational reform. His views on controversial issues such as censorship and birth control were ambiguous; after expressing initial support for the Censorship Bill, he eventually went on to denounce it in scathing terms ("I think it is high time the people of this country found some other way of loving God than by hating women" ), and while generally professing to oppose the sale of prophylactics, he voiced support for their usage in certain cases. He was most passionate on the subject of sanitation in schools and in urban and rural housing, about which he spoke frequently. His speeches frequently contained puns, wordplays, and extended poetic quotations, and were sometimes given in favour of facetious schemes, such as his attempt to have the phoenix statue in Phoenix Park included in the 1929 Wild Birds Protection Bill. He was notoriously scornful of the government's attempts to reinstate the Irish language (which he referred to as "Woolworth's Irish"), proposing that funding be used instead for housing and school health services, and remained perpetually suspicious of Éamon de Valera, against whose economic policies, character, and personal appearance he often hurled invectives during Seanad proceedings. De Valera eventually dissolved the Seanad when it persisted in obstructing Government proposals, effectively ending Gogarty's political career.

=== Literary endeavours ===
Gogarty maintained close friendships with W. B. Yeats, AE, George Moore, Lord Dunsany, James Stephens, Seumas O'Sullivan, and other Dublin literati, and he continued to write poetry in the midst of his political and professional duties. Three small books of poetry (Hyperthuleana, Secret Springs of Dublin Song, and The Ship and Other Poems) were published between 1916 and 1918. Gogarty also tried his hand at playwriting, producing a slum drama (Blight) in 1917 under the pseudonym "Alpha and Omega", and two comedies (A Serious Thing and The Enchanted Trousers) in 1919 under the pseudonym "Gideon Ouseley", all three of which were performed at the Abbey Theatre.

Gogarty devoted less energy to his medical practice and more to his writing during the twenties and thirties. His 1924 book of poetry An Offering of Swans won the gold medal for poetry at the revived Tailteann Games. The book also includes Tailteann Ode, which won him a bronze medal at the 1924 Olympic Games (at the time, the Olympics included art competitions in addition to sports). Gogarty later described the poem as "rather tripe"). In 1929 another book of verse, Wild Apples, was published, and was followed in 1933 by Selected Poems. Gogarty was also a member of Yeats's Irish Academy of Letters and frequently assisted in arranging its social functions. 1936 saw the publication of Yeats's Oxford Book of Modern Verse, which contained seventeen of Gogarty's poems and an introduction proclaiming him "one of the great lyric poets of our age." The over-representation given to Gogarty outraged many poets and perplexed Gogarty himself, who remarked, "What right have I to figure so bulkily? None from a poetical point of view... Sappho herself could not have made a more subjective anthology."

In 1935 Gogarty published his first prose work, As I Was Going Down Sackville Street (subtitled "A Phantasy in Fact"), a semi-fictional novel-memoir that tells, in reverse chronological order, the story of Gogarty's Dublin through a series of interconnected anecdotes and lively characters sketches. Shortly after its publication, it became the subject of a lawsuit by a Jewish art dealer, Harry Sinclair, who claimed that he and his recently deceased twin brother, William Sinclair, had been libeled by the publication. The two men did not appear as named characters in the book, but some derogatory lines of verse beginning "Two Jews grew in Sackville Street", written by Gogarty's friend George Redding and included in a scene in the novel, were widely known to refer to the Sinclair siblings. Harry Sinclair further recognised a reference to his grandfather, described in the text as one who "enticed little girls into his office", an offence of which his grandfather had in fact been convicted. Gogarty responded to the charges by claiming that the unnamed Jews were parodies or composite characters rather than deliberate evocations of living persons. The case attracted a great deal of public attention, with one commentator observing that "only The Pickwick Papers, rewritten by James Joyce, could really capture the mood of this trial." Among the witnesses for the plaintiff was William Sinclair's nephew-by-marriage, Samuel Beckett, then a little-known writer, who was humiliatingly denounced as a "bawd and blasphemer" by Gogarty's counsel. Gogarty ultimately lost the lawsuit and was ordered to pay £900 in damages, plus court costs. This outcome deeply embittered Gogarty, who had already suffered financial setbacks after the stock market crash of 1929 and felt that the verdict had been politically motivated.

In spite of the Sackville Street imbroglio, Gogarty's output over the next two years was prolific. In 1938 he published I Follow St. Patrick, a historical and geographic portrait of Ireland as told through Gogarty's rambling visits to various sites traditionally associated with St. Patrick; in 1939 he published Tumbling in the Hay, a semi-autobiographical comic novel about medical students in turn-of-the-century Dublin, and Elbow Room, another collection of poetry. In 1938 he relocated to London for a second time and brought forth his own libel suit against the young poet Patrick Kavanagh, whose autobiography The Green Fool said of Kavanagh's first visit to Gogarty's home: "I mistook Gogarty's white-robed maid for his wife or his mistress; I expected every poet to have a spare wife." Gogarty, who had taken offence at the close coupling of the words "wife" and "mistress", was awarded £100 in damages.

=== American years ===
With the onset of World War II, Gogarty, who was an enthusiastic and talented amateur aviator, attempted to enlist in the RAF and the RAMC as a doctor. He was denied on grounds of age (then 61). He then departed in September 1939 for an extended lecture tour in the United States, leaving his wife to manage Renvyle House, which had since been rebuilt as a hotel. When his return to Ireland was delayed by the war, Gogarty applied for American citizenship and eventually decided to reside permanently in the United States. Though he regularly sent letters, funds, and care packages to his family and returned home for occasional holiday visits, he never again lived in Ireland for any extended length of time. His primary American residence was in New York, where he was known to frequent bars. He also spent time in Vermont and in Wyckoff, New Jersey.

Feeling that he was too old to sit for the medical examinations that would have qualified him as a practitioner in the United States, Gogarty instead chose to support himself entirely by his writing. In addition to various essays and short stories, his prose output included Going Native, a satire on English social mores, Mad Grandeur and Mr. Petunia, two period narratives composed with an eye to having them optioned as Hollywood films, and Rolling Down the Lea and It Isn't This Time of Year at All!, two loosely constructed memoirs. He also published two books of poems, Perennial and Unselected Poems; a collection of bawdy verse, The Merry Muses of Hibernia, was planned but never completed. Gogarty's literary output during the forties and fifties is generally considered to be inferior to his earlier writings.

Gogarty suffered from heart complaints during the last few years of his life, and in September 1957 he collapsed in the street on his way to dinner. He died on 22 September 1957; his body was flown home to Ireland and buried in Cartron Church, Moyard, near Renvyle.

== Literary portrayal ==
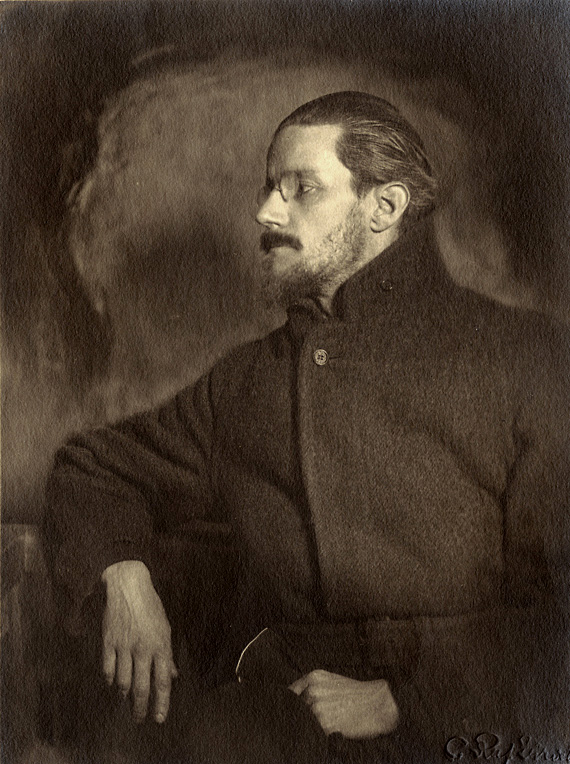
James Joyce

A highly visible and distinctive Dublin character during his lifetime, Gogarty appears in a number of memoirs penned by his contemporaries, notably George Moore's Hail and Farewell, where he goes both by his own name and by the pseudonym "Conan". His most famous literary incarnation, however, is as Buck Mulligan, the irrepressible roommate of Stephen Dedalus in James Joyce's Ulysses. Mulligan quotes a number of songs and poems known to have been written by Gogarty, the most famous of which, "The Song of the Cheerful (But Slightly Sarcastic) Jesus", was originally sent to Joyce as a belated Christmas peace offering after their quarrels of 1904. Other details, such as Mulligan's Hellenism, his status as a medical student, his history of saving men from drowning, his friendship with George Moore, and the metrical arrangement of his full name (Malachi Roland St. John Mulligan) parallel Gogarty's biography. Due to his influence on Joyce (he is also sometimes cited as an inspiration for Dubliners character Ignatius Gallaher and Exiles antagonist Robert Hand), Gogarty's name often comes up in Joyce scholarship, though Gogarty's own editors and biographers have complained that these references are frequently inaccurate, owing to Gogarty-related errata in Richard Ellmann's James Joyce and a tendency to conflate the real-life Gogarty with the fictional character of Buck Mulligan.

It has also been suggested that the speaker of W. B. Yeats's poem High Talk, "Malachi Stilt-Jack", is intended to be a representation of Gogarty.

== Legacy ==
A pub in the Temple Bar district of Dublin is named after him, and an annual Oliver St. John Gogarty Literary Festival is held in the author's family home, now the Renvyle House Hotel in Connemara. A surgical ward in the descendant hospital of his workplace, the Tallaght University Hospital, now also bears his name.

William Dawson wrote The Lay of Oliver Gogarty about his kidnap and escape.

A documentary on Gogarty, Oliver St. John Gogarty: Silence Would Never Do was produced in 1987.

== Books ==
- Hyperthuleana (1916)
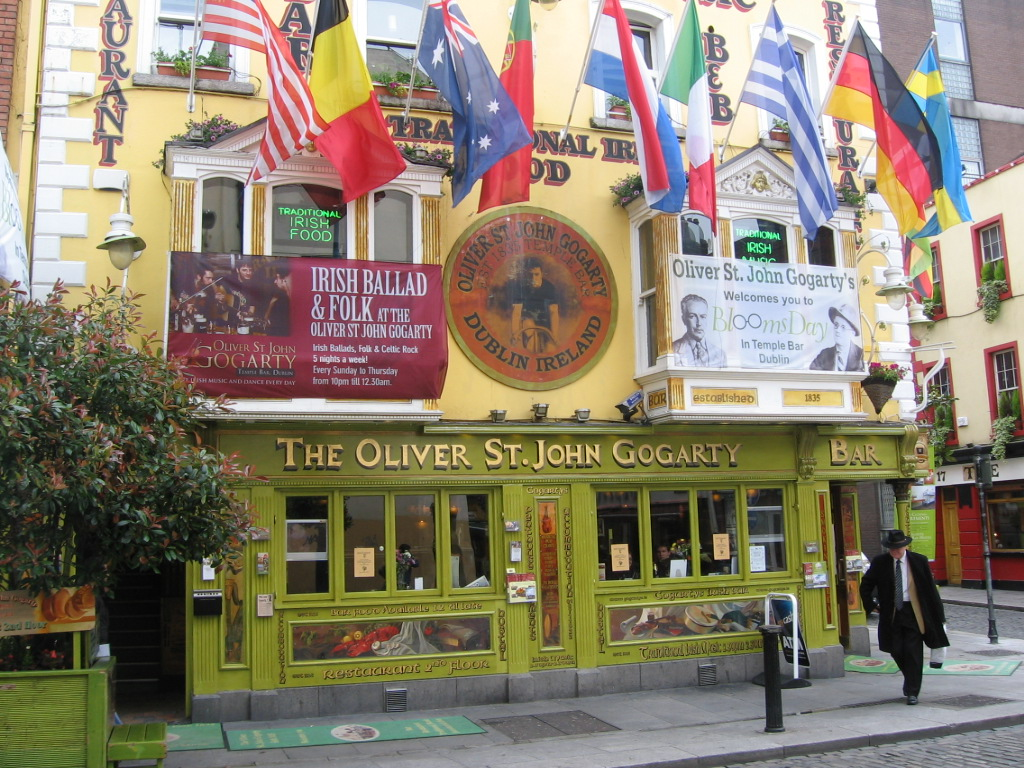
  The Oliver St. John Gogarty Pub in Dublin
- Blight: The Tragedy of Dublin (1917)
- Secret Springs of Dublin Song (1918)
- The Ship and Other Poems (1918)
- A Serious Thing (1919)
- The Enchanted Trousers (1919)
- An Offering of Swans (1923)
- An Offering of Swans and Other Poems (1924)
- Wild Apples (three versions: 1928, 1929, 1930)
- Selected Poems (1933)
- As I Was Going Down Sackville Street (1937)
- Others to Adorn (1938)
- I Follow St. Patrick (1938)
- Elbow Room (two versions: 1939, 1942)
- Tumbling in the Hay (1939)
- Going Native (1940)
- Mad Grandeur (1941)
- Perennial (two versions: 1944, 1946)
- Mr. Petunia (1946)
- Mourning Became Mrs. Spendlove (1948)
- Rolling Down the Lea (1949)
- Intimations (1950)
- Collected Poems (1951)
- Unselected Poems (1954)
- It Isn't This Time of Year At All!: An Unpremeditated Autobiography (1954)
- Start From Somewhere Else (1955)
- A Weekend in the Middle of the Week (1958)
- The Poems & Plays of Oliver St. John Gogarty (containing rare and unpublished material, 2001)

== Arms ==
Coat of arms of Oliver St. John Gogarty
| Notes Granted 25 January 1923 by Sir Nevile Rodwell Wilkinson, Ulster King of Arms. Crest On a wreath of the colours on a mount Gules a hawk rising pean grasping in the dexter claw a Rod of Aesculapius Proper. Escutcheon Pean on a pile Or an olive branch fructed Proper. Motto Ο ΚΑΙΡΟΣ ΟΞΤΣ [Greek: Ho kairos oxts, 'the weather is keen.'] |

== Sources ==
=== Biography ===
- Carens, James (1979). Surpassing Wit. New York: Columbia University Press. p. 22.
- Ellmann, Richard (1982). James Joyce. Oxford: Oxford University Press. ISBN 978-0-19-503103-4.
- O'Connor, Ulick (1963). Oliver St. John Gogarty: A Poet and His Times. London: Jonathan Cape.
- J. B. Lyons, Oliver St. John Gogarty (1976, 1980)
