= As I Was Going Down Sackville Street =

1937 book by Oliver St. John Gogarty

First US edition

As I Was Going Down Sackville Street: A Phantasy in Fact is a book by Oliver St. John Gogarty. Published in 1937 by Rich & Cowan in the UK and by Reynal and Hitchcock in the US, it was Gogarty's first extended prose work and was described by its author as "something new in form: neither a 'memoir' nor a novel". Its title is taken from an obscure Dublin ballad of the same name, which was "rescued from oblivion and obloquy" by Gogarty's erstwhile friend James Joyce, who recited it for Gogarty in 1904 after hearing it in inner city Dublin.

The book features many of Gogarty's Dublin acquaintances and well-known contemporaries as characters. Shortly after its publication, it became the subject of a highly publicised libel lawsuit.

== Literary style ==
As I Was Going Down Sackville Street is told in the first person from the perspective of Gogarty. Unlike a conventional memoir, however, the book deals little with events in Gogarty's personal or professional life, instead using his persona as a vehicle for encountering and describing the geography and chief inhabitants of 20th-century Dublin. In writing Sackville Street, Gogarty sought to give "past and present the same value in time"; thus, while the first-person narrative is continuous and appears to occupy a compact chronological space, the events detailed span the years 1904–1932. Gogarty also rearranged events into (approximately) reverse chronological order, beginning with life in the Irish Free State and moving backwards through the Irish Civil War, the Irish War of Independence, and, finally, colonial Ireland. This structure was intended to loosely recall that of Dante's Divine Comedy, with the Dublin of the mid-1920s–1930s standing for Inferno, the Dublin of the 1910s–1920s for Purgatorio, and turn-of-the-century Dublin for Paradiso.

The tone of the book is predominately anecdotal and conversational; much of its action consists of lively accounts of dinner parties, luncheons, "at-homes", pub conversations, and chance meetings, allowing Gogarty to draw vivid portraits of his contemporaries by reproducing their speech patterns and characteristic social interactions. Gogarty also frequently embarks on humorous, rambling narrative monologues, pertaining to other characters, to the landscape, and to various salient issues of the time. While not strictly polemical, As I Was Going Down Sackville Street is notable for its political overtones, expressed in both Gogarty's monologues and in the speeches he places in the mouths of other characters. As a Catholic with strong intellectual and personal ties to the Anglo-Irish Ascendancy, a founding member of Sinn Féin with a deep devotion to Arthur Griffith, and a Free State Senator who had suffered kidnapping and arson at the hands of IRA gunmen, Gogarty's political identity was complex and idiosyncratic, and in his book he gave frequent vent to his animosity towards Éamon de Valera and his disillusionment with Irish politics.

== Characters ==
As I Was Going Down Sackville Street opens with the disclaimer "The names in this book are real, the characters fictitious", and a number of notable figures make appearances in its pages, including Eoin O'Duffy, James Joyce, W. B. Yeats, George Moore, Lord Dunsany, Seumas O'Sullivan (as "Neil"), Æ, Robert Yelverton Tyrrell, John Pentland Mahaffy, Arthur Griffith, Michael Collins, and Horace Plunkett.

One of the most frequently recurring figures in the book is that of Endymion, a Dublin eccentric, who prominently features in the opening and closing scenes and appears at intervals throughout the text. Gogarty critic James F. Carens has argued that the character of Endymion, a genial madman who has adjusted "Reason to the phantasmagoria of Life", can be read both as an embodiment of the city of Dublin and as a parody or simulacrum of Gogarty himself.

== Libel lawsuit ==
As I Was Going Down Sackville Street was highly anticipated before its publication as "a riposte to Ulysses and an appendage to [George Moore's] Ave, Salve, Vale", and as a result of its popularity became the subject a lawsuit brought forth by Harry Sinclair, a Jewish art dealer, who said that two passages in the book contained libels against himself and his recently deceased twin brother, William Sinclair. These consisted of verses written by Gogarty's friend, George Redding, and prose commentary by Gogarty:

'And one thing more—where can we buy antiques?'

'Nassau street, Sackville street, Liffey street where Naylor's is, and all along the quays. Have you not heard?

Two Jews grew in Sackville Street
And not in Piccadilly,
One was gaitered on the feet,
The other one was Willie.
And if you took your pick of them,
Whichever one you choose,
You'd like the other one more than him,
So wistful were these Jews.
They kept a shop for objects wrought
By Masters famed of old,
Where you, no matter what you bought
Were genuinely sold.
But Willie spent the sesterces
And brought on strange disasters
Because he sought new mistresses
More keenly than old Masters.
Two Jews grew in Sackville Street
And not in Piccadilly,
One was gaitered on the feet,
The other one was Willie.

'As I say, I will produce George...' 'Well, until you do, just recite his latest.' 'Very well,' said I. 'You must know that George is not only the arbiter elegantiae of Dublin, but a critic of the grosser forms of license. Now, there was an old usurer who had eyes like a pair of periwinkles on which somebody had been experimenting with a pin, and a nose like a shrunken tomato, one side of which swung independently of the other. The older he grew the more he pursued the immature, and enticed little girls into his office. That was bad enough; but he had grandsons, and these directed the steps of their youth to follow in their grandfather's footsteps, with more zeal than discrimination. I explained the position to George, who, after due fermentation produced the following pronunciamento:

It is a thing to wonder at, but hardly to admire,
How they who do desire the most,
guard most against desire:
They choose their friend or mistress
so that none may yearn to touch her
Thus did the twin grandchildren of the
ancient Chicken Butcher.

'I like the roll and oracular sound of "Thus did," etc., and the play on the meanings of wonder and admire—Nil admirari!—And the organ-note in that "Twin grandchildren" which endows their infamy with grandeur until it almost equals the fame of the Great Twin Brethren, Castor and beneficent Pollux. "Verse calls them forth" from vulgar obloquy.' 'Another laurel or burden for "George" to bear,' said Mrs. Shillington. 'Who are the Great Twin Brethren?'

'Consummations of the poet's dream. Shadows invoked by sound. Men who do not exist. I thought I made that clear.'

The plaintiff claimed that he and his brother (who had heard of the book's contents shortly before his death) were slanderously characterised as lechers and usurers, and could be recognised in the first set of verses by the name "Willie" (a reference to William Sinclair) and the mention of gaiters (which Harry Sinclair was apparently known to wear). Harry Sinclair further identified himself and his brother as the "twin grandchildren" in the second passage based on the description of their grandfather as a "pursuer of the immature", and submitted papers to the court to prove that his own grandfather had in fact been guilty of the same offence.

The case attracted a great deal of public attention, with one commentator observing that "only The Pickwick Papers, rewritten by James Joyce, could really capture the mood of this trial." Various witnesses were called by both sides, some claiming to have instantly recognised the Sinclair siblings from the description in the text, others claiming to have made no such connection; some witnesses also claimed that William Sinclair had immediately threatened to sue Gogarty upon first hearing of the verses, while others recalled that Gogarty had occasionally recited them in William Sinclair's presence without protest from him. Appearing as a "publication witness" for the prosecution was Samuel Beckett, then a little-known writer, whose impartiality was called into question based on his familial relationship to the plaintiff (his aunt had been married to William Sinclair) and who was humiliatingly denounced by Gogarty's counsel as "the bawd and blasphemer from Paris". Gogarty, put on the stand, alleged that the unnamed Jews of the verses were parodies or composite characters rather than deliberate evocations of living persons, and were intended to throw discredit on the practice of usury and moneylending generally.

Gogarty ultimately lost the lawsuit and was ordered to pay IR£900 in damages, plus court costs; the total cost to him was £2,000 (equivalent to well over €100,000 in 2010 terms). This outcome deeply embittered Gogarty, who had already suffered financial setbacks after the Great Depression and felt that the trial had been politically motivated.

Gogarty's critics differ over the extent to which the language of these passages can be attributed to anti-Semitism. Biographer J. B. Lyons says that Gogarty, though often sharp-tongued with respect to the Sinclair siblings, was not actually an anti-Semite, citing the evidence of his friendships with other Dublin Jews. James Carens says that anti-Semitic remarks are present in Gogarty's early journalism and in his private correspondence, but upholds Gogarty's claim that usury and child molestation, not Jews or Judaism, were the intended targets of satire in Sackville Street.

== Influence ==
Beckett critic Sighle Kennedy has argued that Gogarty's portrayal of the lunatic Endymion in As I Was Going Down Sackville Street influenced Beckett's novel Murphy, which was published just two years after Beckett had first read Gogarty's book in connection with the Sinclair trial.
