= Todd McEwen =

American writer (born 1953)

- Born: 1953 (age 72–73); California, U.S.
- Education: Columbia University
- Occupation: Writer
- Spouse: Lucy Ellmann

Todd McEwen (born 1953 in California) is an American writer. A graduate of Columbia University, he has been a resident of Scotland since 1981 and is married to novelist Lucy Ellmann. He has published four novels: Fisher's Hornpipe (1983), McX: A Romance of the Dour (1991), Arithmetic (1998) and Who Sleeps with Katz (2003). He has also written for Granta magazine and contributed book reviews to The Guardian and other newspapers. He teaches creative writing at the University of Kent.
