= Blight (play) =

Play by Oliver St. John Gogarty

Blight: The Tragedy of Dublin is a play by Oliver St. John Gogarty. One of the earliest Irish "slum dramas", it focuses on the horrific conditions prevalent in Dublin's tenements and the ineffectuality of the medical and charitable institutions set up to combat them. The message of the play reflects Gogarty's belief that only a complete overhaul of the Dublin housing system, coupled with a more effective campaign of preventive medicine, were capable of producing positive change.

Gogarty's friend Joseph O'Connor, though not involved in the actual writing process, contributed some anecdotal material to the play, and when it was first performed at the Abbey Theatre in December 1917, the name of the author was given as "Alpha and Omega", a joint pseudonym referring to Gogarty and O'Connor.

== Background ==
A medical doctor as well as a writer, Oliver Gogarty was deeply troubled by the state of housing in urban Dublin. After joining the staff of the Meath Hospital in 1911, he began to speak out about the health hazards posed by Dublin schools and tenements. In one 1913 letter he asked: "Does a tenement only cease to be a tenement, when it becomes a tomb? The houses in Church Street, as elsewhere, have the saving attribute of killing only one generation or part of a generation... but what of the houses of Church Street, the houses of six and seven feet high, that cannot fall, but can only go on reeking forever. The houses in Kean's Court—what of those? And what of those structures in Thunder's Court, where one common privy bemerded beyond use, stands beside one common water supply which a corporation notice guards from waste." Believing that the Dublin Corporation was to blame for the current state of affairs, he also called for a list of slum property-holders to be published because "we are dealing with a form of property so injurious to public health and public morals, that it should be made accordingly publicly responsible." This sense of outrage was to remain with Gogarty his whole life; as a senator, he made twenty-seven separate speeches on housing in a single year.

John Wyse Jackson and Peter Costello have argued that Gogarty's portrayal of the Foley family was at least partially inspired by visits to the home of his friend, James Joyce. Though not tenement dwellers, the Joyces' situation was impoverished, and Gogarty was later to describe their house in Cabra as "a miserable home". Similarities can be detected between the clever, idle schemer "Stanislaus Tully" and Joyce's father, John Stanislaus Joyce. James Carens has also noted that Gogarty gives "the affectations of his Ely Place neighbors, George Moore and Sir Thornley Stoker" to two of the Townsend Thanatorium's board members.

== Plot ==
The story of Blight centres on the character of Stanislaus Tully, a Dublin labourer who has been injured on the job and is hoping to receive damages from the courts. He has greatly overexaggerated the extent of his injuries to reap the largest monetary award possible, and is living with his sister while he "convalesces." His pregnant sister, Mrs. Foley, has two children: Jimmy, a cripple, and Lily, a prostitute. Her husband is away fighting in the British Army. The first two acts are devoted to their squalid living conditions and the well-meaning but misguided attempts of a charity worker to alleviate their situation with platitudes. At the end of the second act, it is revealed that Tully has won his court case and come into a small fortune. He immediately abandons his rabble-rousing reformist stance and decides to buy property in the slums.

The third act takes place in the Townsend Thanatorium Boardroom and opens with a comic discussion between two medical students, Medical Dick and Medical Davy, and a charwoman; during the course of their dialogue, it is revealed that Lily Foley has contracted syphilis. The Board is engaged in a plan to build a shamrock-shaped mortuary chapel for Protestants, Catholics, and Nonconformists, which is criticised as useless and frivolous by Dr. Tumulty, a cynical, practical-minded doctor. Tully, now a member of the Dublin Corporation, arrives to broker the sale of some tenement property as a site for the project. The meeting is disrupted by Tully's brother-in-law, Foley, who has returned from the war to find that he has been evicted from his tenement and that his wife, son, and newborn child have all perished in his absence. The Board responds with meaningless words of sympathy but apparently does not feel any culpability, and Dr. Tumulty is left to state the moral of the play: "All your benevolent formulism only makes the position more and more hopeless. The less you spend on prevention the more you will pay for cure. Until the citizens of this city realize that their children should be brought up in the most beautiful and favorable surroundings the city can afford, and not in the most squalid, until this floundering Moloch of a Government realize that they must spend more money on education than on police, this city will continue to be the breeding-ground of disease, vice, hypocrisy and discontent. I leave you to erect your tripartite edifice over the children of the city of blight."

Gogarty critics have noted that the over-prominence of Tumulty (who is essentially a mouthpiece for Gogarty and not a character in his own right) in Act III constitutes a "structural flaw". However, while acknowledging that the polemic play "suffers from the limitations of its kind", Gogarty's skilful use of comic dialogue and irony have been praised.

== Reception and influence ==
The play was highly anticipated by the theatre going public and played to packed houses, with the Irish Independent commenting that "such an audience has not been at the Abbey since the night Shaw's Blanco Posnet was first produced [in 1909]." Critics commented on the play's grim efficacy in unveiling the horrors of slumdom, and Sir John Russell, speaking at a charitable dinner a week after the Blight's appearance, said that it exposed the plight of Dublin's poor as no play ever had. Andrew Malone, writing a review of Irish drama in 1929, called it "undoubtedly the best play yet produced by an Irish dramatist dealing with a specifically Irish social problem" and observed that it "is marked by a critically ironic insight into social conditions." Blight drew in a record £160 in profits for the Abbey, but was cancelled by Lady Gregory after ten days, possibly due to the controversiality of some of its content.

Seán O'Casey was present at Blight's opening night, later stating that it was one of only two plays that he had ever gone to see at the Abbey. It has been suggested that Blight may have had an influence on O'Casey's later drama, particularly Juno and the Paycock, but O'Casey himself claimed that it "had no influence whatever on me."
