= J. B. Lyons =

John Benignus Lyons (22 July 1922 – 25 October 2007), better known as J. B. Lyons and widely known as Jack Lyons, was an Irish physician, medical historian, writer, and professor of medical history. He was described as "one of the foremost Irish medical writers of the twentieth century".

== Life and writings ==
Born in Kilkelly, County Mayo, his father was a dispensary doctor. His first school was the Kilkelly National School, followed by Castleknock College. He went on to study medicine at University College Dublin. He first worked in Dublin hospitals, including Mater Hospital and the County Hospital, Castlebar, County Mayo, and then moved to England. He achieved the Doctor of Medicine (at the National University of Ireland) and in 1949 he was made a member of the Royal College of Physicians of Ireland.

He then left to become a ship's doctor on a cargo liner sailing to Japan and South America. On his return to land, Lyons settled in Manchester, England, where he met, and in 1950 married, a Welsh nurse, Muriel Jones. In 1955, they and their three children, David, Kate and Jane, moved to Dalkey, just outside Dublin, and Lyons became the consultant physician at St. Michael's Hospital in Dún Laoghaire and then in 1959 became a fellow of the Royal College of Physicians. In 1959, he became a consultant physician at Mercer's Hospital, Dublin.

Lyons achieved a WHO fellowship to visit leading neurological centres in New York, Chicago, Minneapolis and San Francisco. He then wrote his first book, A Primer of Neurology, which was published in 1974. Soon after, he began to write fictional works using the pseudonym Michael Fitzwilliam, which were set in hospitals. He then wrote more biographies and medical history books. In 1975 he was appointed Professor of the History of Medicine, Royal College of Surgeons in Ireland.

His biographies included studies of Oliver St. John Gogarty (published in 1976 and 1980), a biography of Tom Kettle (1983) and of the Irish-African explorer Surgeon-Major Parke (1994). Lyons wrote much about Irish medical history and contributed chapters to other books, including Diseases in Dubliners: Tokens of Disaffection (1981)

== Selected works by J. B. Lyons ==
- The citizen surgeon: a biography of Sir Victor Horsley 1857-1916 (London: Peter Dawnay, 1966)
- James Joyce and medicine (Dublin: Dolmen Press, 1973)
- A primer of neurology (London: Butterworths, 1974)
- Brief lives of Irish doctors (Dublin: Blackwater, 1978)
- Oliver St. John Gogarty: the man of many talents: a biography (Dublin: Blackwater, 1980)
- The enigma of Tom Kettle: Irish patriot, essayist, poet, British soldier, 1880-1916 (Dublin: Glendale Press, 1983)
- An assembly of Irish surgeons: lives of presidents of the Royal College of Surgeons in Ireland in the 20th century (Dublin: Glendale Press & Royal College of Surgeons in Ireland, 1984)
- The irresistible rise of the R.C.S.I. / by J. B. Lyons, H. O’Flanagan and W. A. L. MacGowan. (Dublin, 1984)
- Thrust syphilis down to hell and other rejoyceana: studies in the border-lands of literature and medicine (Dublin: Glendale, 1988)
- The quality of Mercer’s: the story of Mercer’s Hospital, 1734-1991 (Dublin: Glendale, 1991)
- What did I die of? : the deaths of Parnell, Wilde, Synge, and other literary pathologies (Dublin: Lilliput Press, 1991)
- Surgeon-Major Parke’s African journey 1887-89 (Dublin: Lilliput Press, 1994)
- A pride of professors: the professors of medicine at the Royal College of Surgeons in Ireland 1813 - 1985 (Dublin: A. & A. Farmar, 1999)
- 2000 years of Irish medicine (Dublin, 1999)

== Later life ==
In 2002 the Royal College of Surgeons in Ireland published Borderlands: essays on literature and medicine in honour of J. B. Lyons / edited by Davis Coakley and Mary O’Doherty (Dublin: Royal College of Surgeons in Ireland, 2002).

J. B. Lyons died, aged 85, in 2007.
