= Dermot St. John Gogarty =

Irish architect (1908–1985

- Born: 5 September 1908; Dublin, Ireland
- Died: 20 January 1985 (aged 76); Derby, England
- Other name: Dermot Gogarty
- Education: Downside School; Pembroke College, Cambridge
- Occupation: Architect
- Known for: Apprentice of Edwin Lutyens
- Spouse: Carmel Esmonde (m. 1935)
- Father: Oliver St. John Gogarty

Dermot St. John Gogarty, RIAI, RIBA (5 September 1908 – 20 January 1985) was an Irish architect of Dublin and Galway active throughout mid-twentieth-century Ireland. He was the second son of Oliver St. John Gogarty.

== Biography ==
Dermot St. John Michael Gogarty was born to Oliver St. John Gogarty and Martha Gogarty (née Duane) in Dublin in September 1908. He was educated at Downside School and Pembroke College, Cambridge.

He apprenticed under Edwin Lutyens, and worked for Vincent Kelly. He established his practice in Dublin in 1936, and then moved to Galway in 1948. Gogarty had a keen interest in rowing throughout this life, stemming from his university days.

In 1935, he married Carmel Esmonde, daughter of the late Irish nationalist MP John Esmonde, from whom he later divorced. He died in Derby, England in 1985.
