= Richard Ellmann =

American writer and literary critic (1918–1987)

- Photo of Richard Ellmann
- Born: Richard David Ellmann; March 15, 1918; Highland Park, Michigan, U.S.
- Died: May 13, 1987 (aged 69); Oxford, England
- Occupations: Literary critic; biographer
- Spouse: Mary Ellmann
- Children: 3, including Lucy

Richard David Ellmann, FBA (March 15, 1918 – May 13, 1987), was an American literary critic and biographer of the Irish writers James Joyce, Oscar Wilde, and William Butler Yeats. He won the U.S. National Book Award for Nonfiction for James Joyce (1959), one of the most acclaimed literary biographies of the 20th century. Its 1982 revised edition won James Tait Black Memorial Prize. Ellmann was a liberal humanist, and his academic work focuses on the major modernist writers of the 20th century.

== Life ==
Ellmann was born in Highland Park, Michigan, the second of three sons of James Isaac Ellman, a lawyer, and his wife Jeanette (née Barsook). His father was a Romanian Jew and his mother was a Ukrainian Jew from Kiev. Ellmann served in the United States Navy and Office of Strategic Services during World War II. He studied at Yale University, receiving his B.A. in 1939, his M.A. in 1941, and his PhD (for which he won the John Addison Porter Prize) in 1947. In 1947, he was awarded a B.Litt. degree (an earlier form of the M.Litt) by Trinity College Dublin, where he was resident while researching his biography of Yeats. As a Yale undergraduate at Jonathan Edwards College, Ellmann was a member of Phi Beta Kappa (scholastic honor society); Chi Delta Theta (literary honor society); and, with James Jesus Angleton, a member of the Executive Editorial Board of the Yale Literary Magazine. He achieved "Scholar of the Second Rank" (current equivalent: magna cum laude). The 1939 Yale Banner undergraduate yearbook published an untitled Ellmann account (similar in concept and style to Oscar Wilde's parables, which Ellmann cited in his 1987 biography Oscar Wilde) of a chagrined Joseph, husband of Mary, and Jesus Christ's custodial father:

Joseph was no match for the angel and for Mary's flattering tears. He felt a wince of disappointment at the idea that she had had a vision too, but then she was his wife, and perhaps the whole family now had the prophetic gift. He would have to try it out, on the harvest. Meanwhile he would seek to forget his jealousy, despite the fact that the story sounded a bit fantastic to a reasonable man, which he guessed he was, and it would be well not to talk about it much outside. It was better to leave things the way they were. Not much of a wedding night, but one could tell white lies about that to one's friends.

Ellmann later returned to teach at Yale, and there he and Charles Feidelson Jr. edited the anthology The Modern Tradition. He earlier taught at Northwestern and the University of Oxford before serving as Emory University's Robert W. Woodruff Professor from 1980 until his death.

He was Goldsmiths' Professor of English Literature at Oxford University, 1970–1984, then Professor Emeritus, a fellow at New College, Oxford, 1970–1987, and an extraordinary fellow at Wolfson College, Oxford, from 1984 until his death. He was also a Fellow of the British Academy. In 1983 he delivered the British Academy's Sarah Tryphena Phillips Lecture in American Literature and History.

Ellmann used his knowledge of the Irish milieu to bring together four literary luminaries in Four Dubliners: Wilde, Yeats, Joyce, and Beckett (1987), a collection of essays first delivered at the Library of Congress.

His wife, the former Mary Donoghue, whom he married in 1949, was an essayist. The couple had three children: Stephen (b. 1951), a South Africa constitutional scholar, Maud (b. 1954), and Lucy (b. 1956). The first two became academics and Lucy a novelist and writing teacher.

Ellmann died of motor neurone disease in Oxford on May 13, 1987, at the age of 69.

The University of Tulsa's McFarlin Library, Department of Special Collections and University Archives, acquired many of Ellmann's collected papers, artifacts, and ephemera. Other manuscripts are housed in the Northwestern University's Library special collections department.

== Biographies ==
=== Yeats ===
In Yeats: The Man and the Masks, Ellmann drew on conversations with the poet's widow, George Yeats (the former Georgie Hyde-Lees), along with thousands of pages of unpublished manuscripts, to write a critical examination of Yeats's life.

=== Joyce ===
Ellmann is perhaps best known for his literary biography of James Joyce. Anthony Burgess called James Joyce "the greatest literary biography of the century". The Irish novelist Edna O'Brien remarked that "H. G. Wells said that Finnegans Wake was an immense riddle, and people find it too difficult to read. I have yet to meet anyone who has read and digested the whole of it—except perhaps my friend Richard Ellmann." Ellmann uses quotations from Finnegans Wake as epigraphs in his biography.

=== Wilde ===
Ellmann completed his cradle-to-grave biography of Oscar Wilde shortly before his death. He was posthumously awarded both a U.S. National Book Critics Circle Award in 1988 and the 1989 Pulitzer Prize for Biography. The book was the basis for the 1997 film Wilde, directed by Brian Gilbert.

Oscar Wilde has long been considered to be the definitive work on its subject. The philosopher and biographer Ray Monk called it a "rich, fascinating biography that succeeds in understanding another person". Nevertheless, because Ellmann rushed to finish it before his death, he was unable to thoroughly revise it, and the book contains many factual errors, the most infamous of which is the claim that a photograph of the Hungarian diva Alice Guszalewicz depicts Wilde dressed as Salomé. Many of these errors are documented in Horst Schroeder's book Additions and Corrections to Richard Ellmann’s Oscar Wilde.

== The Richard Ellmann Lectures ==
The Richard Ellmann Lectures in Modern Literature at Emory University were established in his honor.

=== Richard Ellmann Lecturers ===
- 1988 Seamus Heaney
- 1990 Denis Donoghue
- 1992 Anthony Burgess (resigned; deceased)
- 1994 Helen Vendler
- 1996 Henry Louis Gates Jr.
- 1999 A. S. Byatt
- 2001 David Lodge
- 2004 Salman Rushdie
- 2006 Mario Vargas Llosa
- 2008 Umberto Eco
- 2010 Margaret Atwood
- 2013 Paul Simon
- 2017 Colm Tóibín

== Bibliography ==
As author

- Yeats: The Man And The Masks (1948; revised edition in 1979)
- The Identity of Yeats (1954; second edition in 1964)
- James Joyce (1959; revised edition in 1982)
- Eminent Domain: Yeats among Wilde, Joyce, Pound, Eliot, and Auden (1970)
- Literary Biography: An Inaugural Lecture Delivered Before the University of Oxford on 4 May 1971 (1971)
- Ulysses on the Liffey (1972)
- Golden Codgers: Biographical Speculations (1976)
- The Consciousness of Joyce (1977)
- James Joyce's hundredth birthday, side and front views: A lecture delivered at the Library of Congress on March 10, 1982 (1982)
- Oscar Wilde at Oxford (1984)
- W. B. Yeats's Second Puberty; A Lecture Delivered At The Library Of Congress On April 2, 1984 (1985)
- Oscar Wilde (1987) [but see Horst Schroeder: Additions and Corrections to Richard Ellmann's OSCAR WILDE, second edition, revised and enlarged (2002)]
- Four Dubliners: Wilde, Yeats, Joyce, and Beckett (1987)
- a long the riverrun: Selected Essays (1988)

As editor

- My Brother's Keeper: James Joyce's Early Years (Stanislaus Joyce; ed. Richard Ellmann, 1958)
- The Critical Writings of James Joyce (Eds. Ellsworth Mason and Richard Ellmann, 1959)
- Edwardians and Late Victorians (Edited and with a foreword by Richard Ellmann, 1960)
- The Modern Tradition: Backgrounds of Modern Literature (with Charles Feidelson Jr., 1965)
- Letters of James Joyce Vol. 2 (Ed. Richard Ellmann, 1966)
- Letters of James Joyce Vol. 3 (Ed. Richard Ellmann, 1966)
- Giacomo Joyce (James Joyce; ed. Richard Ellmann, 1968)
- Oscar Wilde: a Collection of Critical Essays (Ed. Richard Ellmann, 1969)
- The Artist as Critic: Critical Writings of Oscar Wilde (Ed. Richard Ellmann, 1969)
- The Norton Anthology of Modern Poetry (Eds. Richard Ellmann and Robert O'Clair, 1973)
- Selected Letters of James Joyce (Ed. Richard Ellmann, 1975)
- Modern Poems: An Introduction to Poetry (Eds. Richard Ellmann and Robert O'Clair, 1976)
- The Picture of Dorian Gray and Other Writings by Oscar Wilde (Ed. Ellmann, 1982)

As translator

- Selected Writings: The Space Within by Henri Michaux (New Directions, 1951; reprinted in 1968), selections from L'Espace du dedans (1944)

== Sources ==
- Oxford Dictionary of National Biography
