= Pureza (novel) =

1937 novel by José Lins do Rego

Pureza is a 1937 Portuguese-language novel by the Brazilian writer José Lins do Rego. The novel has been translated into English and published twice as Pureza - A Novel of Brazil translated Lucie Marion 1947, and again Pureza 1968

The novel was immediately successful in Brazil and almost immediately was made into a film, Pureza (1940). The film was produced by Adhemar Gonzaga, and directed by the Portuguese director Chianca de Garcia.
