= José Lins do Rego =

Brazilian novelist (1901–1957)

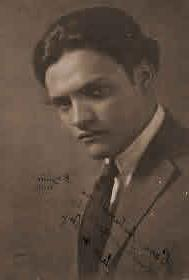
José Lins do Rego (1918)

José Lins do Rego Cavalcanti (July 3, 1901 – September 12, 1957) was a Brazilian novelist most known for his semi-autobiographical "sugarcane cycle." These novels were the basis of films that had distribution in the English-speaking world.

Cavalcanti was born in Pilar, Paraíba. Along with Graciliano Ramos and Jorge Amado he stands as one of the greatest regionalist writers of Brazil According to Otto Maria Carpeaux, José Lins was "the last of the story tellers". His first novel, Menino de Engenho ("Boy from the plantation"), was published with difficulty, but soon it got praised by the critics. He died in Rio de Janeiro, aged 56.

== Novels ==
- Menino de Engenho (1932)
- Doidinho (1933)
- Bangüê (1934)
- O Moleque Ricardo (1935)
- Usina (1936)
- Pureza (1937 English; "Purity")
- Pedra bonita (1938)
- Riacho doce (1939)
- Água-mãe (1941)
- Fogo morto (1943)
- Eurídice (1947)
- Cangaceiros (1953)
- Histórias da velha Totonha (1936)
- Gordos e magros (1942)
- Poesia e vida (1945)
- Homens, seres e coisas (1952)
- A casa e o homem (1954)
- Meus verdes anos (1956)
- Presença do Nordeste na literatura brasileira (1957)
- O vulcão e a fonte (1958)
- Dias idos e vividos (1981, posthumously)
- Mae de todos (1981, posthumously)
- Ligeiros Traços: escritos de juventude (2007)

== Films based on his Novels ==
- Pureza, directed by Chianca de Garcia (1940).
- Plantation Boy, directed by Valter Lima (1965), based on Menino de Engenho novel.
- The Last Plantation, directed by Marcos Farias (1976), based on Fogo morto novel.

== Translations ==
The "Academia Brasileira de Letras" points out that several Novels by José Lins do Rego have been translated internationally: Germany, Argentina, Spain, USA, France, England, Italy, Portugal, and Korea.
