= Menino de engenho =

1932 novel by José Lins do Rego

- Title page for Menino de engenho (1932)
- Author: José Lins do Rego
- Language: Portuguese
- Publication date: 1932
- Publication place: Brazil

Menino de engenho (Plantation boy) is a novel written by the Brazilian writer José Lins do Rego. It was first published in 1932.

== Synopsis ==
Carlos Melo, or Carlinhos, narrates in first person, in a nostalgic manner, the childhood spent in the plantation Santa Rosa. When his father was sent to a mental house after killing his mother, Carlinhos moved from Recife to Santa Rosa, in the plantation that belonged to his grandfather, Coronel José Paulino. Carlinhos' childhood was divided between "good" and "evil": in the company of his aunt his behavior was more gentle (the "good"); living with his cousins, he was extroverted and libertine (the "evil").

Living in the plantation, Carlinhos became familiar with the social inequalities between the plantation masters and their employees; in addition, he almost joined the Cangaço (he even asked the bandit Antônio Silvino to let him follow the group). There Carlinhos also came to know love, first with his cousin Lili, who died as a child and later with another cousin, Maria Clara, who lived in Recife and spent a few days visiting the plantation. Maria Clara was a little older than Carlinhos and told him about all the fun and new things that happened in the city. But the romance didn't last long, as the cousin went back to Recife. Soon after, Carlinhos lost his "second mother": his aunt Maria got married and the boy was left to the care of his cold and strict aunt Sinhazinha.

However, aunt Sinhazinha's austerity made Carlinhos even more libertine: the boy, only twelve years old, caught gonorrhea. His relatives then decided to "set him straight" by sending him to school.
