= James Joyce (biography) =

1959 biography of Irish writer James Joyce, by American academic Richard Ellmann

- Author: Richard Ellmann
- Language: English
- Subject: James Joyce
- Genre: Biography
- Publication date: 1959
- Publication place: United States

James Joyce is a biography of the Irish modernist James Joyce written by Richard Ellmann, which informs an understanding of this author's complex works. It was published in 1959 (a revised edition was released in 1982).

== Reception ==
Anthony Burgess was so impressed with the biographer's work that he claimed it to be "the greatest literary biography of the century." Edna O'Brien, the Irish novelist, remarked that "H. G. Wells said that Finnegans Wake was an immense riddle, and people find it too difficult to read. I have yet to meet anyone who has read and digested the whole of it—except perhaps my friend Richard Ellmann." Ellmann quotes extensively from Finnegans Wake as epigraphs in his biography of Joyce.

In 2025 Harvard University Press published a biography of the biography, Ellmann's Joyce: The Biography of a Masterpiece and Its Maker by Zachary Leader.
