= Kidd (surname) =

Kidd is a surname. Notable people with the surname Kidd include:

- Albert Kidd (born 1961), Scottish footballer
- Alexander Kidd, British tug of war competitor
- Benjamin Kidd (1858–1916), British sociologist and writer
- Beresford Kidd (1865–1948), Anglican priest and historian
- Bill Kidd (born 1956), Scottish politician
- Billy Kidd (born 1943), American skier
- Billy Kidd (footballer) (1908–1978), English footballer
- Brian Kidd (born 1949), English footballer and coach
- Bruce Kidd (born 1943), Canadian athlete
- Carol Kidd (born 1945), Scottish singer
- Carl Kidd (born 1973), American football player
- Chip Kidd (born 1965), American graphic designer
- Culver Kidd Jr. (1914–1995), American politician
- David Kidd (disambiguation)
- Don Kidd (1937–2020), American politician
- Doug Kidd (born 1941), New Zealand politician
- Edward Kidd (1849–1912), Canadian politician
- Edward I. Kidd (1845–1902), American politician
- Eddie Kidd (born 1959), British stuntman
- Ellen Kidd (1852–1932), suffragist and pickle entrepreneur
- Ernest Kidd (1900–1974), English footballer
- Flora Kidd (1926–2008), English-Canadian writer
- Frederick Kidd (1921–1997), Canadian politician
- Gary Kidd (born 1985), Irish cricketer
- George Kidd (disambiguation)
- Glenna Sue Kidd (1933–2017), American baseball player
- Hilton Kidd (1922–2011), Australian rugby league footballer
- Ian Kidd (born 1964), Ice hockey player
- Isaac C. Kidd (1884–1941), admiral in the U.S. Navy
- Isaac C. Kidd Jr. (1919–1999), admiral in the U.S. Navy
- Jack Kidd (disambiguation)
- James Kidd (disambiguation)
- Jane Kidd (artist), Canadian artist
- Jane Kidd (equestrian), British equestrian
- Jane Kidd (politician), American politician from Georgia
- Jimmy Kidd, English footballer
- Jason Kidd (born 1973), American basketball player and coach
- Jodie Kidd (born 1978), English model
- John Kidd (disambiguation)
- Johnny Kidd (disambiguation)
- Joseph Kidd (1824–1918), Irish-born London doctor
- Joumana Kidd (born 1972), American actress and journalist
- Juanita Kidd Stout (1919–1998), American judge
- Kathryn H. Kidd (died 2015), American writer
- Keith Kidd (born 1962), American football player
- Kidd (Danish rapper) (born 1989), Danish rapper
- Leslie Kidd (1889–1984), English-born Irish cricketer
- Lewis Kidd (footballer) (born 1995), Scottish footballer
- Lewis Kidd (American football) (born 1997), American football player
- Mae Street Kidd (1904–1999), American businesswoman
- Marilyn Kidd (born 1964), Australian rower
- Maxx Kidd (1941–2017), American record producer
- Michael Kidd (1915–2007), American choreographer
- Michael Kidd (physician) (born 1959), Australian general practitioner
- Milton Y. Kidd (1826–1884), American politician from Maryland
- Nikki Kidd (born 1987), Scottish field hockey player
- Paul Kidd, Australian writer
- Percy Kidd (1851–1942), English doctor
- Peter Kidd (born 1965), Australian judge
- Richard A. Kidd (born 1943), ninth Sergeant Major of the Army of the United States
- Ronald Kidd (1889–1942) English civil rights campaigner
- Roy Kidd (1931–2023), American football player and coach
- Rusty Kidd (1946–2020), American politician
- Ryan Kidd (born 1971), English footballer
- Samuel Kidd (1804–1843) missionary and professor of Chinese at London University
- Stanton Kidd (born 1992), American basketball player in the Israeli Basketball Premier League
- Sue Monk Kidd (born 1948), American writer
- Sydney Kidd (born 1992), Canadian ice hockey player
- Thomas Kidd (disambiguation)
- Trevor Kidd (born 1972), Canadian ice hockey player
- Tyson Kidd (born 1980), Canadian professional wrestler
- Vince Kidd (born 1989), English singer
- Virginia Kidd (1921–2003), American writer and literary agent
- Warren Kidd (born 1970), American basketball player
- Wes Kidd, American music producer
- William Kidd (c.1654-1701), Scottish privateer
  - William Kidd (disambiguation), multiple people

== Fictional characters ==
- Alex Kidd, a video game character and the former mascot of Sega before the introduction of Sonic the Hedgehog
- Stella Kidd, a character in Chicago Fire (TV series)
- Mr. Kidd, a James Bond villain from Diamonds Are Forever
- Bick, Beck, Tommy, and Storm Kidd, main characters of James Patterson's Treasure Hunters (book series)

== See also ==
- Kydd (surname)
- Peter Kid (Kid is also a surname)
- Kid (nickname)
