= Jonathan Kydd =

Jonathan Kydd is the name of:

- Jonathan Kydd (academic) (born 1951), British leading expert in Agricultural Development Economics
- Jonathan Kydd (actor) (born 1956), British actor
