= Ulysses (novel) =

1922 novel by James Joyce

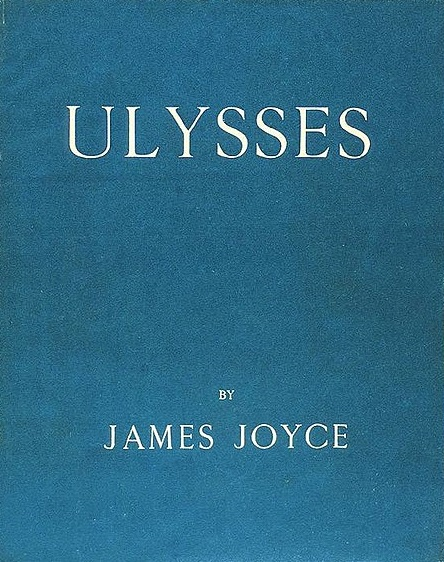
- First edition of Ulysses by James Joyce, published by Paris-Shakespeare, 1922. The colour of the cover was meant to match the blue of the Greek flag.
- Author: James Joyce
- Language: English
- Genre: Modernist novel
- Set in: Dublin, 16–17 June 1904
- Publisher: Shakespeare and Company
- Publication date: 2 February 1922
- Publication place: Paris, France
- Media type: Print: hardback
- Pages: 732
- Dewey Decimal: 823.912
- LC Class: PR6019.O8 U4 1922
- Preceded by: A Portrait of the Artist as a Young Man
- Text: Ulysses (novel) at Wikisource

Ulysses is a modernist novel by the Irish writer James Joyce. Partially serialised in the American journal The Little Review from March 1918 to December 1920, the entire work was published in Paris by Sylvia Beach on 2 February 1922, Joyce's fortieth birthday. It is considered one of the most important works of modernist literature and a classic of the genre, having been called "a demonstration and summation of the entire movement".

Ulysses chronicles the experiences of three Dubliners over the course of a single day, 16 June 1904 (which its fans now celebrate annually as Bloomsday). Joyce chose this date because it was the day of his first outing with Nora Barnacle, who became his wife. Ulysses is the Latinised name of Odysseus, the hero of Homer's epic poem the Odyssey, and the novel establishes a series of parallels between Leopold Bloom and Odysseus, Molly Bloom and Penelope, and Stephen Dedalus and Telemachus. There are also correspondences with William Shakespeare's play Hamlet and with other literary, religious, and mythological figures, including Jesus, Elijah, Moses, Dante Alighieri and Don Juan. Such themes as antisemitism, human sexuality, British rule in Ireland, Catholicism and Irish nationalism are treated in the context of early-20th-century Dublin. Ulysses is highly allusive and written in a variety of styles.

The writer Djuna Barnes quoted Joyce as saying, "The pity is ... the public will demand and find a moral in my book—or worse they may take it in some more serious way, and on the honour of a gentleman, there is not one single serious line in it. ... In Ulysses I have recorded, simultaneously, what a man says, sees, thinks, and what such seeing, thinking, saying does, to what you Freudians call the subconscious."

According to the writer Declan Kiberd, "Before Joyce, no writer of fiction had so foregrounded the process of thinking". Its stream of consciousness technique, careful structuring and prose of an experimental nature—replete with puns, parodies, epiphanies and allusions—as well as its rich characterisation and broad humour have led it to be regarded as one of the greatest literary works. Since its publication it has attracted controversy and scrutiny, ranging from an obscenity trial in the United States in 1921 to protracted disputes about the authoritative version of the text.

== Background ==
Joyce first encountered the figure of Odysseus/Ulysses in Charles Lamb's Adventures of Ulysses, an adaptation of the Odyssey for children, which seems to have established the Latin name in Joyce's mind. At school he wrote an essay on the character, titled "My Favourite Hero". Joyce told Frank Budgen that he considered Ulysses the only all-round character in literature. He considered writing another short story for Dubliners, to be titled "Ulysses" and based on a Jewish Dubliner named Alfred H. Hunter, a putative cuckold. The idea grew from a story in 1906, to a "short book" in 1907, to the vast novel he began in 1914.

== Locations ==
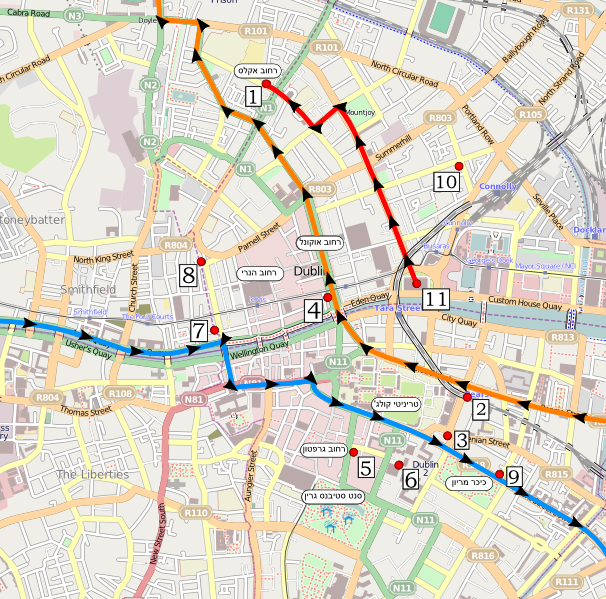
Ulysses Dublin map

The action of the novel moves from one side of Dublin Bay to the other, opening in Sandycove to the south of the city and closing on Howth Head to the north. The plot of the first three chapters, along with chapter 12, "Nausicaa", takes place on the shores of Dublin Bay, off the map.

1. Leopold Bloom's home at 7 Eccles Street is the setting of episode 4 ("Calypso"), episode 17 ("Ithaca"), and episode 18 ("Penelope").
2. The post office on Westland Row is a setting of episode 5 ("Lotus Eaters").
3. Sweny's Pharmacy on Lincoln Place, where Bloom purchases soap, is also a setting of episode 5 ("Lotus Eaters").
4. The Freeman's Journal on Prince's Street North, off of O'Connell Street, is the setting of episode 7 ("Aeolus").
5. Davy Byrne's pub serves as the setting of episode 8 ("Lestrygonians").
6. The National Library of Ireland is the setting of episode 9 ("Scylla and Charybdis").
7. Ormond Hotel at Ormond Quay on the banks of the Liffey is the setting of episode 11 ("Sirens").
8. Barney Kiernan's pub serves as the setting of episode 12 ("Cyclops").
9. The Holles Street Maternity Hospital is the setting of episode 14 ("Oxen of the Sun").
10. Bella Cohen's brothel on 82 Tyrone Street Lower is the setting of episode 15 ("Circe").
11. A cabman's shelter at Butt Bridge is the setting of episode 16 ("Eumaeus").

The orange line on the map shows the route of Paddy Dignam's carriage ride from episode 6 ("Hades"). The Viceroy's journey in episode 10 ("The Wandering Rocks") appears in blue. Bloom and Steven's route in episode 18 ("Penelope") appears in red.

== Structure ==
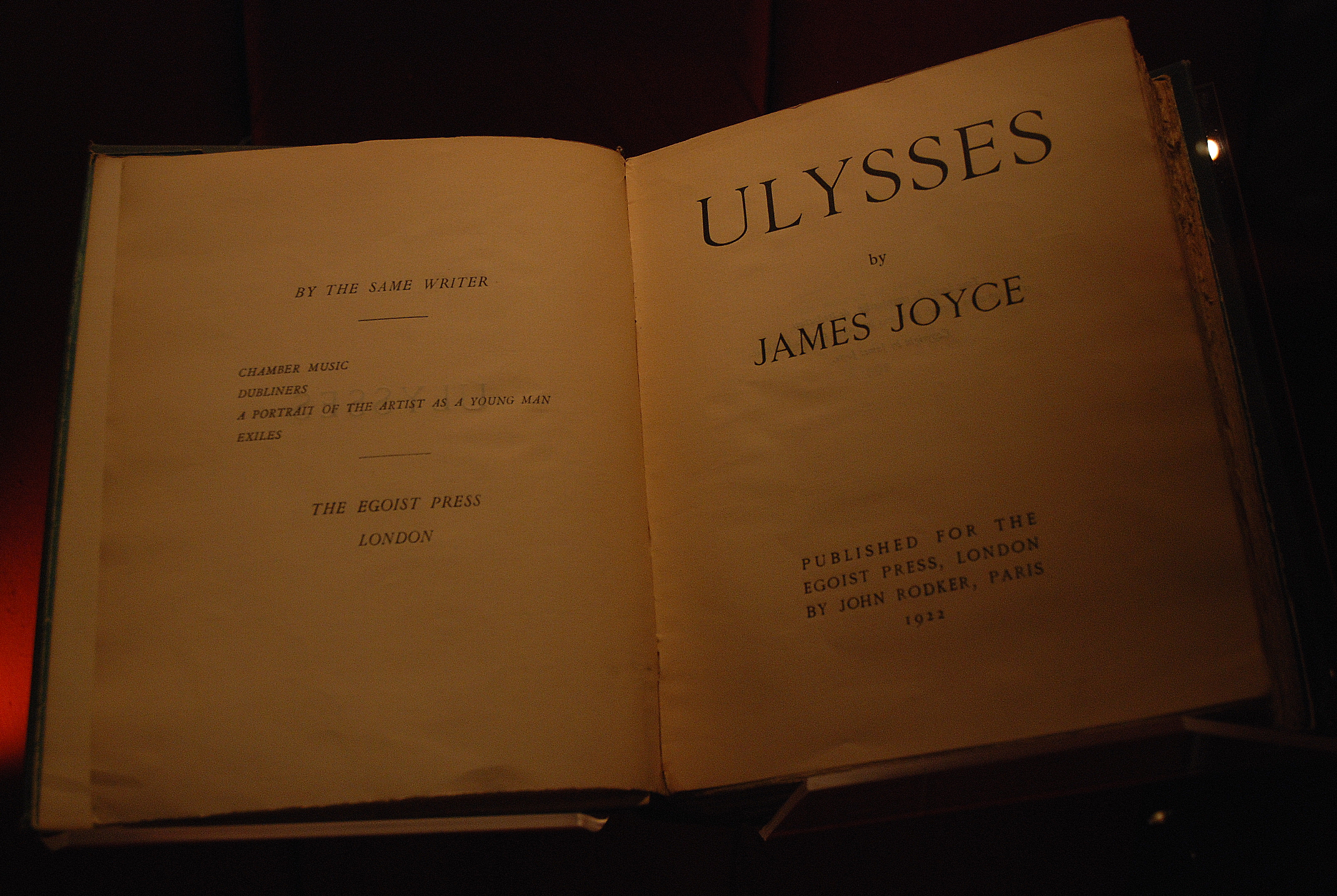
Ulysses, Egoist Press, 1922

Ulysses is divided into the three books (marked I, II, and III) and 18 episodes. The episodes do not have chapter headings or titles, and are numbered only in Gabler's edition. In the various editions, the breaks between episodes are indicated in different ways; in the Modern Library edition, for example, each episode begins at the top of a new page.

Joyce seems to have relished his book's obscurity, saying he had "put in so many enigmas and puzzles that it will keep the professors busy for centuries arguing over what I meant, and that's the only way of insuring [sic] one's immortality". The American judge who decided that Ulysses was not obscene, John M. Woolsey, admitted that it "is not an easy book to read or to understand", and advised reading "a number of other books which have now become its satellites". One such book available at the time was Herbert Gorman's first book on Joyce, which included his own brief list of correspondences between Ulysses and the Odyssey. Another was Stuart Gilbert's study of Ulysses, which included a schema of the novel Joyce created. Gilbert was later quoted in the legal brief prepared for the obscenity trial. Joyce had already sent Carlo Linati a different schema. The Gilbert and Linati schemata made the links to the Odyssey clearer and also explained the work's structure.

=== Joyce and Homer ===
The 18 episodes of Ulysses "roughly correspond to the episodes in Homer's Odyssey". In Homer's epic, Odysseus, "a Greek hero of the Trojan War ... took ten years to find his way from Troy to his home on the island of Ithaca". Homer's poem includes violent storms and a shipwreck, giants, monsters, gods, and goddesses, while Joyce's novel takes place during an ordinary day in early 20th-century Dublin. Leopold Bloom, "a Jewish advertisement canvasser", corresponds to Odysseus in Homer's epic; Stephen Dedalus, the protagonist of Joyce's earlier, largely autobiographical A Portrait of the Artist as a Young Man, corresponds to Odysseus's son Telemachus; and Bloom's wife Molly corresponds to Penelope, Odysseus's wife, who waited 20 years for him to return.

The Odyssey is divided into 24 books, which are divided into 3 parts of 4, 8, and 12 books. Although Ulysses has fewer episodes, their division into 3 parts of 3, 12, and 3 episodes is determined by the tripartite division of The Odyssey. Joyce referred to the episodes by their Homeric titles in his letters. The novel's text does not include the episode titles used below, which originate from the Linati and Gilbert schemata. Joyce scholars have drawn upon both to identify and explain the parallels between Ulysses and The Odyssey.

Scholars have argued that Victor Bérard's Les Phéniciens et l'Odyssée, which Joyce discovered in Zurich while writing Ulysses, influenced his creation of the novel's Homeric parallels. Bérard's theory that The Odyssey had Semitic roots accords with Joyce's reincarnation of Odysseus as the Jewish Leopold Bloom.

Ezra Pound regarded the Homeric correspondences as "a scaffold, a means of construction, justified by the result, and justifiable by it only. The result is a triumph in form, in balance, a main schema with continuous weaving and arabesque." For T. S. Eliot, the Homeric correspondences had "the importance of a scientific discovery". He wrote, "In manipulating a continuous parallel between contemporaneity and antiquity ... Mr. Joyce is pursuing a method which others must pursue after him." This method "is simply a way of controlling, of ordering, of giving a shape and significance to the immense panorama of futility and anarchy which is contemporary history".

Edmund Wilson wrote, "The adventures of Ulysses ... do represent the ordinary man in nearly every common relation. Yet I cannot but feel that Mr. Joyce made a mistake to have the whole plan of his story depend on the structure of the Odyssey rather than on the natural demands of the situation. ... His taste for symbolism is closely allied with his extraordinary poetic faculty for investing particular incidents with universal significance, nevertheless ... it sometimes overruns the bounds of art into an arid ingenuity which would make a mystic correspondence do duty for an artistic reason. The result is that one sometimes feels as if the brilliant succession of episodes were taking place on the periphery of a wheel which has no hub."

In the late 1930s Joyce told Samuel Beckett, "I may have over-systematized Ulysses." Around 1937, in a conversation with Vladimir Nabokov, Joyce disparaged the use of mythology in modern literature. Nabokov replied, "But you employed Homer!" "A whim", Joyce said. When Nabokov pointed to his collaboration with Stuart Gilbert, Joyce replied, "A terrible mistake ... an advertisement for the book. I regret it very much."

The American literary scholar William York Tindall has written, "Joyce considered Homer's myth the complete expression of man. ... Exile, home, humanity, and art, Joyce's concerns, found expression in Homer's Odyssey. ... But the Homeric pattern is only one level of the narrative Joyce composed. Another level is the Christian pattern. ... Bloom is not only Odysseus but Jesus-God. These traditional beliefs, however, are less important than the main level of Joyce's myth: the story of Stephen Dedalus and Mr. Bloom in Dublin or the present, the particular, and the personal. Ulysses is a narrative composition of three levels, to which, by allusion, Joyce added others of less importance. His myth is not the Odyssey but Ulysses."

=== Joyce and Shakespeare ===
After Homer's Odyssey, the literary work Ulysses parallels most closely is William Shakespeare's Hamlet. The play is mentioned in "Telemachus". Hamlet is a symbol in the Linati schema. In the Library episode, Stephen Dedalus puts forth a theory of Hamlet based on 12 lectures, now lost, that Joyce gave in Trieste in 1912. Chief among the implied parallels with Ulysses are Shakespeare and Joyce, King Hamlet and Leopold Bloom, and Prince Hamlet and Stephen.

According to Stephen, Shakespeare has a double presence in Hamlet. The king is the mature Shakespeare; the prince is Shakespeare as a young man. Stephen's insistence on Shakespeare's double presence in Hamlet hints at Joyce's double presence in Ulysses. Bloom is the mature Joyce; Stephen is Joyce as a young man. Other parallels with Hamlet include Gertrude and Molly Bloom, Claudius and Buck Mulligan, and Claudius and Blazes Boylan.

Like Shakespeare, Dante was a major influence on Joyce. It has been argued that the interrelationship of Joyce, Dedalus, and Bloom is defined in the Incarnation doctrines Stephen lists in "Telemachus".

== Plot summary ==
=== Part I: Telemachia ===
==== Episode 1, "Telemachus" ====
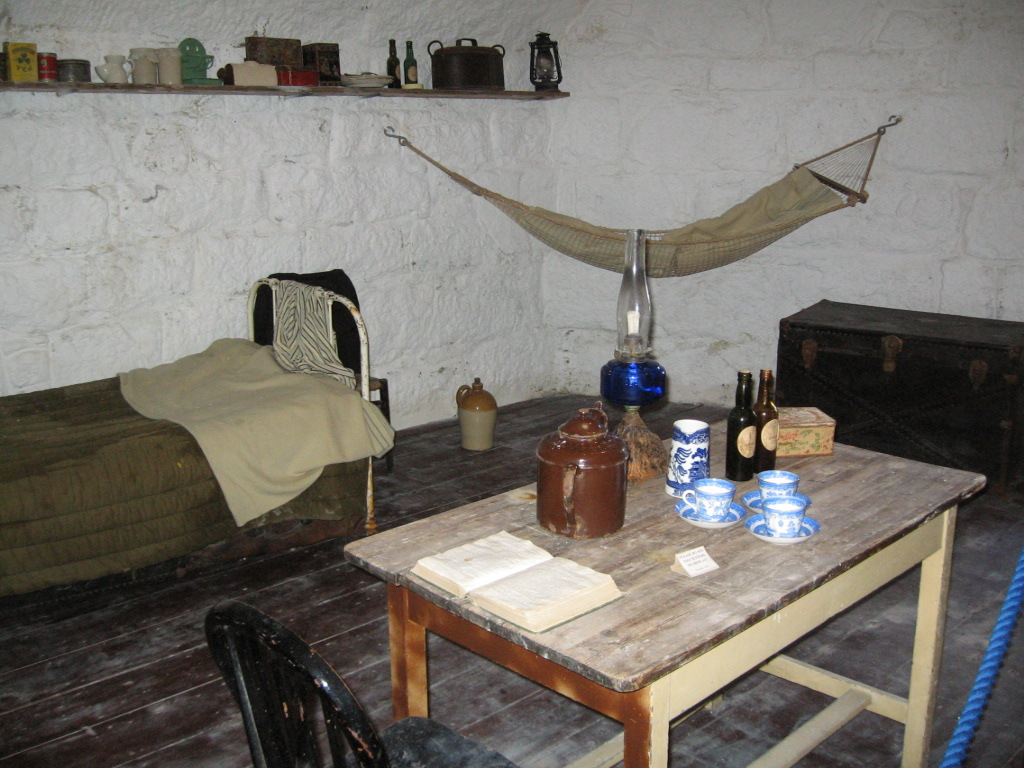
James Joyce's room in the James Joyce Tower and Museum

At 8 a.m., Malachi "Buck" Mulligan, a boisterous medical student, calls an aspiring writer, Stephen Dedalus, up to the roof of the Sandycove Martello tower, where they live. There is tension between Stephen and Mulligan: Stephen overheard Mulligan make a cruel remark about Stephen's recently deceased mother, and Mulligan has invited an English student, Haines, whom Stephen dislikes, to stay with them. The three men eat breakfast and walk to the shore, where Mulligan demands from Stephen the key to the tower and a loan. The three make plans to meet at a pub, The Ship, at 12:30pm. Departing, Stephen decides that he will not return to the tower that night, as Mulligan, the "usurper", has taken it over.

==== Episode 2, "Nestor" ====
Stephen is teaching a history class on the victories of Pyrrhus of Epirus. After class, one student, Cyril Sargent, stays behind so that Stephen can show him how to do a set of algebraic exercises. Stephen looks at Sargent's ugly face and tries to imagine Sargent's mother's love for him. He then visits unionist school headmaster Garrett Deasy, from whom he collects his pay. Deasy asks Stephen to take his long-winded letter about foot-and-mouth disease to a newspaper office for printing. The two discuss Irish history and Deasy lectures on what he believes is the role of Jews in the economy. As Stephen leaves, Deasy jokes that Ireland has "never persecuted the Jews" because the country "never let them in". This episode is the source of some of the novel's best-known lines, such as Dedalus's claim that "history is a nightmare from which I am trying to awake" and that God is "a shout in the street".

==== Episode 3, "Proteus" ====
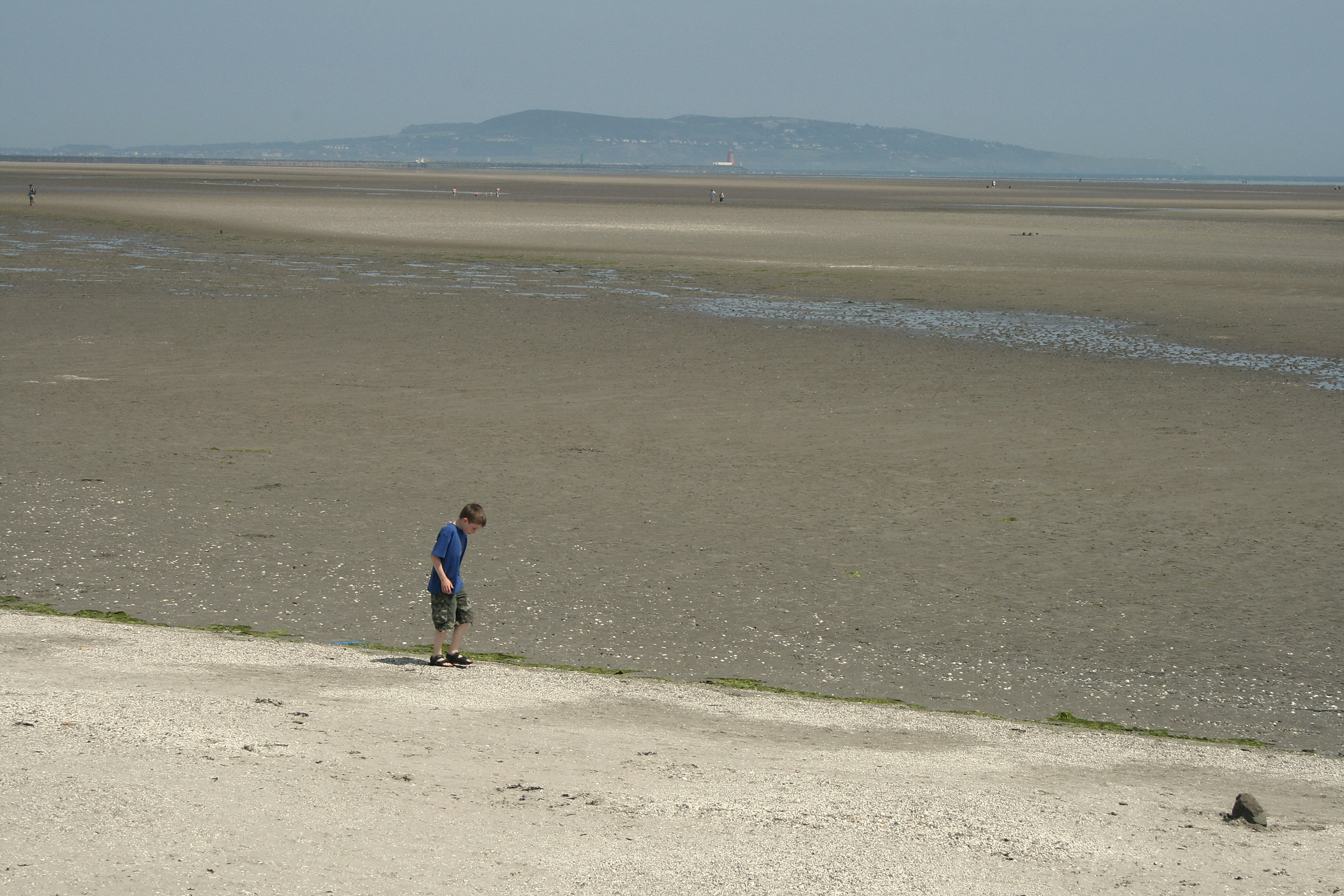
Sandymount Strand looking across Dublin Bay to Howth Head

Stephen walks along Sandymount Strand for some time, mulling various philosophical concepts, his family, his life as a student in Paris, and his mother's death. As he reminisces he lies down among some rocks, watches a couple whose dog urinates behind a rock, scribbles some ideas for poetry and picks his nose. This chapter is characterised by a stream of consciousness narrative style that changes focus wildly. Stephen's education is reflected in the many obscure references and foreign phrases employed in this episode, which have earned it a reputation for being one of the book's most difficult chapters.

=== Part II: Odyssey ===
==== Episode 4, "Calypso" ====
The narrative shifts abruptly. The time is again 8 a.m., but the action has moved across the city and to the second protagonist of the book, Leopold Bloom, a part-Jewish advertising canvasser. The episode opens with the line "Mr. Leopold Bloom ate with relish the inner organs of beasts and fowls." After starting to prepare breakfast, Bloom decides to walk to a butcher to buy a mutton kidney. Returning home, he prepares breakfast and brings it with the mail to his wife Molly as she lounges in bed. One of the letters is from her concert manager Blazes Boylan, with whom she is planning to begin an affair. Bloom reads a letter from their daughter Milly Bloom, who tells him about her progress in the photography business in Mullingar. The episode closes with Bloom reading a magazine story titled "Matcham's Masterstroke", by Mr. Philip Beaufoy, while defecating in the outhouse.

==== Episode 5, "Lotus Eaters" ====
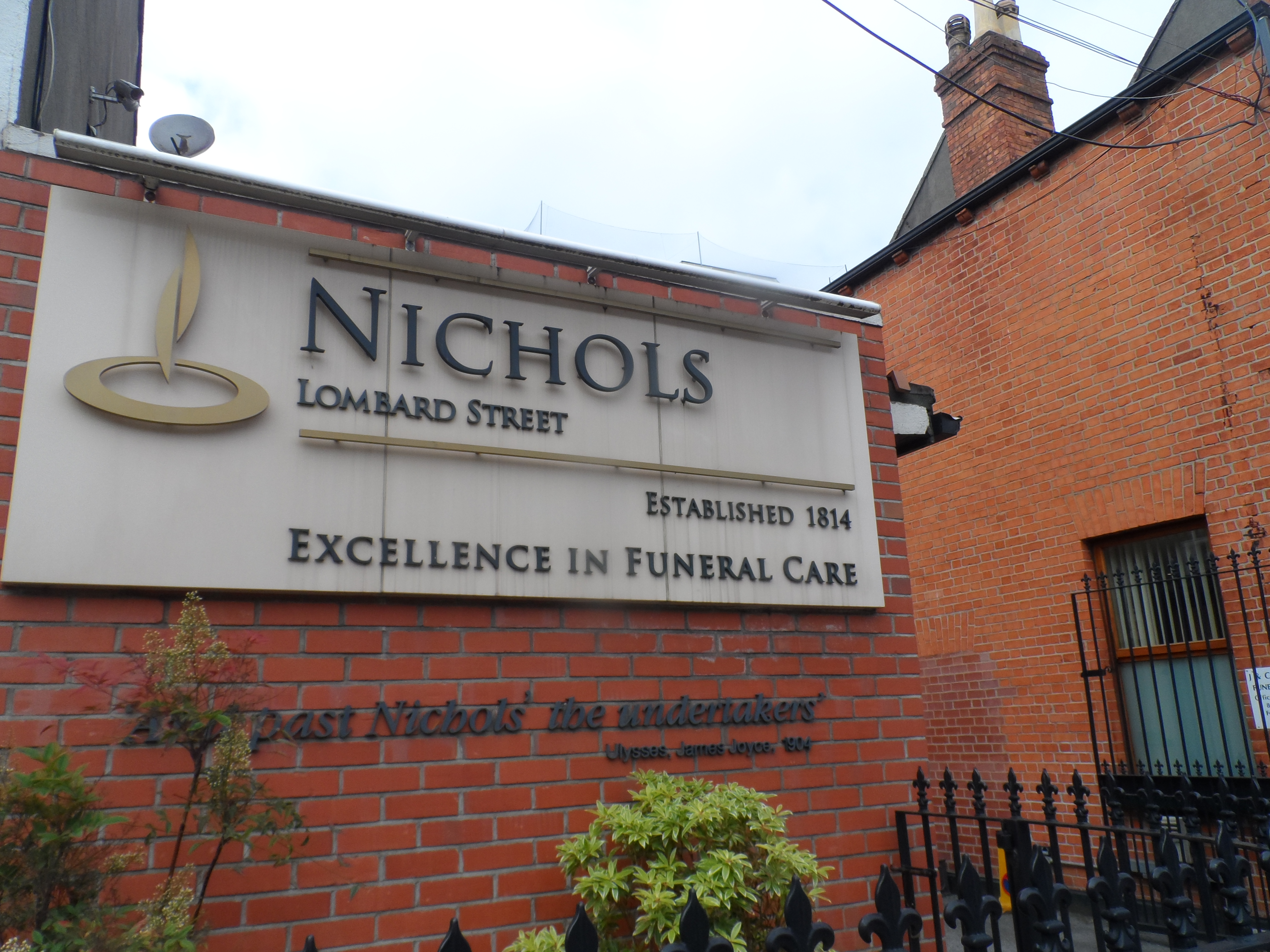
Several Dublin businesses note that they were mentioned in Ulysses, like this undertakers.

While making his way to Westland Row post office Bloom is tormented by the knowledge that Molly will welcome Boylan into their bed later that day. At the post office he surreptitiously collects a love letter from one 'Martha Clifford' addressed to his pseudonym, 'Henry Flower'. He meets an acquaintance, and while they chat, Bloom attempts to ogle a woman wearing stockings, but is prevented by a passing tram. Next, he reads the letter from Martha Clifford and tears up the envelope in an alley. He wanders into a Catholic church during a service and muses on theology. The priest has the letters I.N.R.I. or I.H.S. on his back; Molly had told Bloom that they meant I have sinned or I have suffered, and Iron nails ran in. He buys a bar of lemon soap from a chemist (Sweny's Pharmacy). He then meets another acquaintance, Bantam Lyons, who mistakenly takes him to be offering a racing tip for the horse Throwaway. Finally, Bloom heads towards the baths.

==== Episode 6, "Hades" ====
The episode begins with Bloom entering a funeral carriage with three others, including Stephen's father. They drive to Paddy Dignam's funeral, making small talk on the way. The carriage passes both Stephen and Blazes Boylan. There is discussion of various forms of death and burial. Bloom is preoccupied by thoughts of his dead infant son, Rudy, and the suicide of his own father. They enter the chapel for the service and subsequently leave with the coffin cart. Bloom sees a mysterious man wearing a Mackintosh raincoat during the burial. Bloom continues to reflect upon death, but at the end of the episode rejects morbid thoughts to embrace "warm fullblooded life".

==== Episode 7, "Aeolus" ====
At the office of the Freeman's Journal, Bloom attempts to place an ad. Although initially encouraged by the editor, he is unsuccessful. Stephen arrives bringing Deasy's letter about foot-and-mouth disease, but Stephen and Bloom do not meet. Stephen leads the editor and others to a pub, relating an anecdote on the way about "two Dublin vestals". The episode is broken into short segments by newspaper-style headlines, and is characterised by an abundance of rhetorical figures and devices.

==== Episode 8, "Lestrygonians" ====
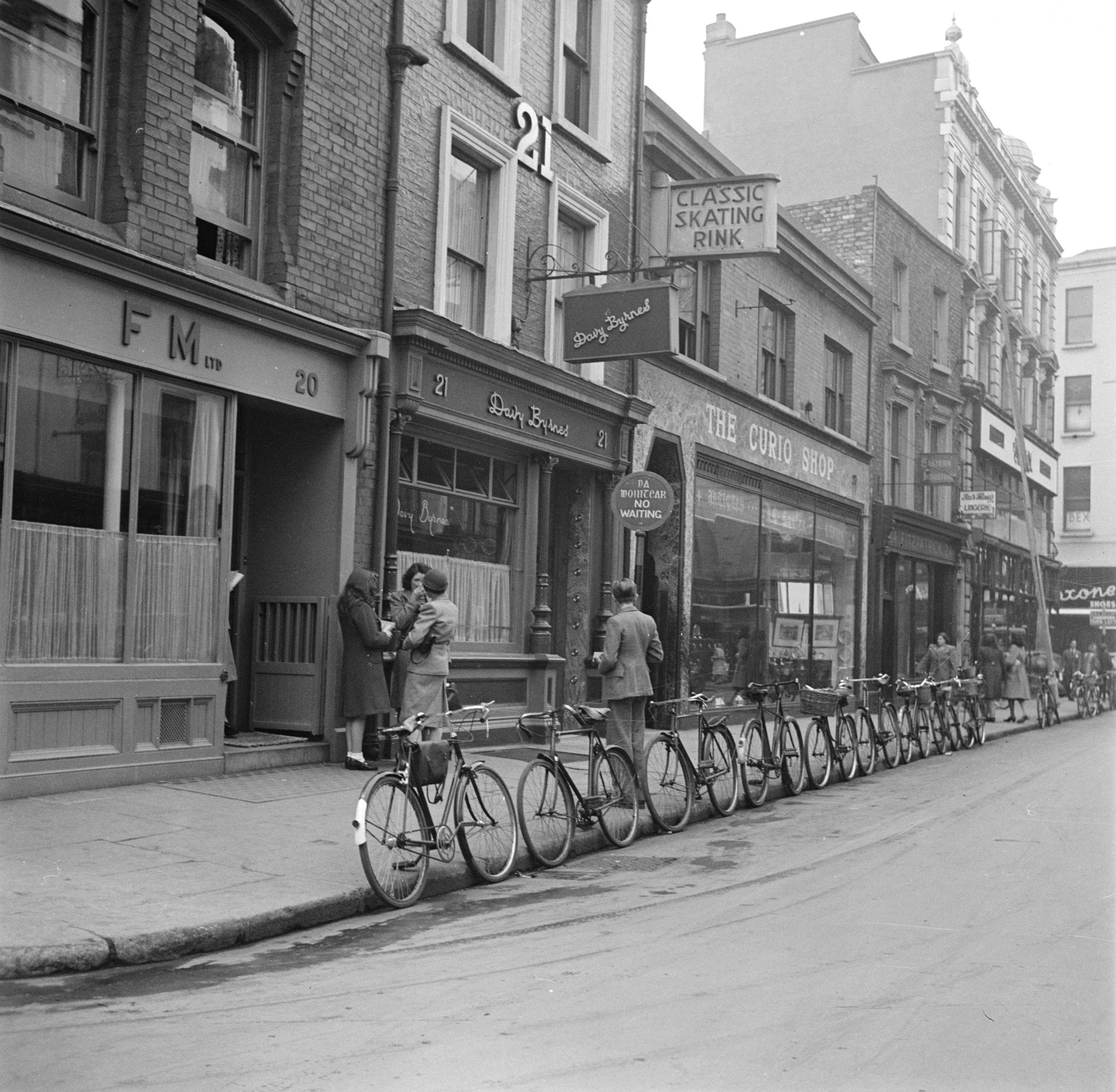
Davy Byrne's Pub, Dublin, where Bloom consumes a gorgonzola cheese sandwich and a glass of burgundy

Bloom's thoughts are peppered with references to food as lunchtime approaches. He meets an old flame, hears news of Mina Purefoy's labour, and helps a blind boy cross the street. He enters the restaurant of the Burton Hotel, where he is revolted by the sight of men eating like animals. He goes instead to Davy Byrne's pub, where he consumes a gorgonzola cheese sandwich and a glass of burgundy, and muses upon the early days of his relationship with Molly and how the marriage has declined: "Me. And me now." Bloom's thoughts touch on what goddesses and gods eat and drink. He ponders whether the statues of Greek goddesses in the National Museum have anuses as do mortals. On leaving the pub Bloom heads toward the museum, but spots Boylan across the street and, panicking, rushes into the gallery across the street from the museum.

==== Episode 9, "Scylla and Charybdis" ====
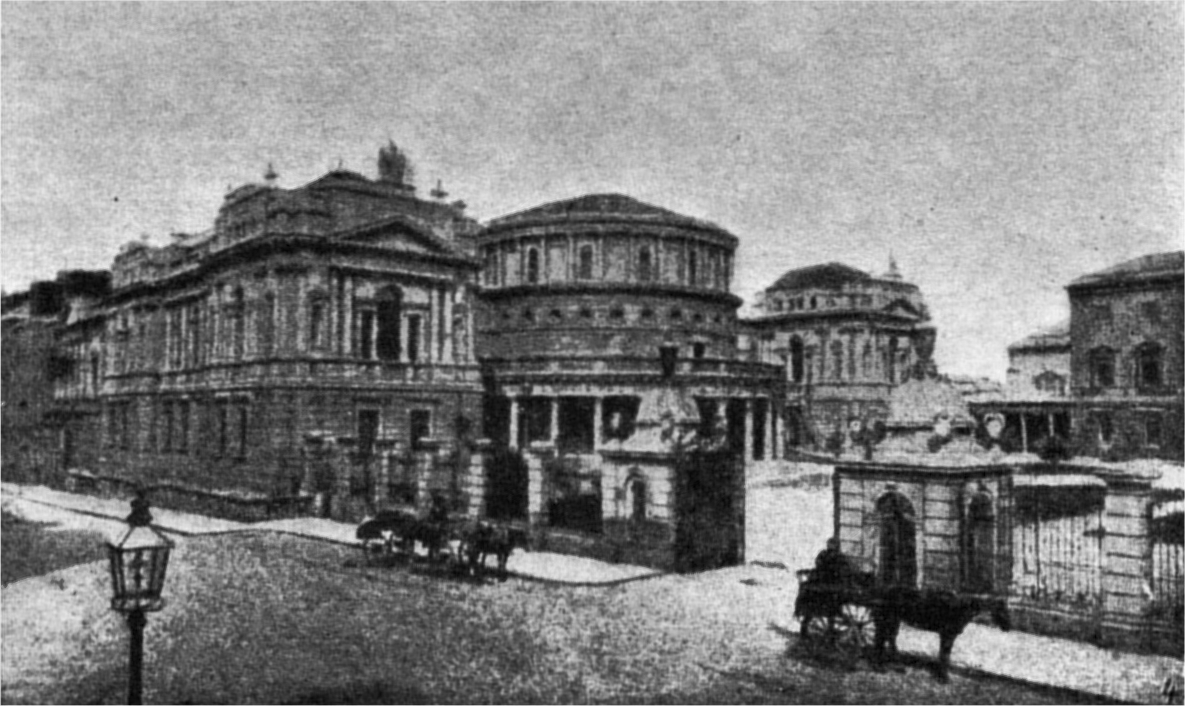
National Library of Ireland

At the National Library, Stephen explains to some scholars his biographical theory of the works of Shakespeare, especially Hamlet, which he argues are based largely on the posited adultery of Shakespeare's wife. Buck Mulligan arrives and interrupts to read out the telegram that Stephen had sent him indicating that he would not make their planned rendezvous at The Ship. Bloom enters the National Library to look up an old copy of the ad he has been trying to place. He passes in between Stephen and Mulligan as they exit the library at the end of the episode.

==== Episode 10, "Wandering Rocks" ====
In this episode, nineteen short vignettes depict the movements of various characters, major and minor, through the streets of Dublin. The episode begins by following Father Conmee, a Jesuit priest, on his trip north, and ends with an account of the cavalcade of the Lord Lieutenant of Ireland, William Ward, Earl of Dudley, through the streets, which is encountered by several characters from the novel.

==== Episode 11, "Sirens" ====
In this episode, dominated by motifs of music, Bloom has dinner with Stephen's uncle at the Ormond hotel, while Molly's lover, Blazes Boylan, proceeds to his rendezvous with her. While dining, Bloom listens to the singing of Stephen's father and others, watches the seductive barmaids, and composes a reply to Martha Clifford's letter.

==== Episode 12, "Cyclops" ====
This episode is narrated by an unnamed inhabitant of Dublin who works as a debt collector. The narrator goes to Barney Kiernan's pub where he meets a character referred to only as "The Citizen". This character is believed to be a satirisation of Michael Cusack, a founder member of the Gaelic Athletic Association. When Leopold Bloom enters the pub, he is berated by the Citizen, a fierce Fenian and antisemite. The episode ends with Bloom reminding the Citizen that his Saviour was a Jew. As Bloom leaves the pub, the Citizen throws a biscuit tin at Bloom's head, but misses. The episode is marked by extended tangents made in voices other than that of the unnamed narrator; these include streams of legal jargon, a report of a boxing match, Biblical passages, and elements of Irish mythology.

==== Episode 13, "Nausicaa" ====
All the action of the episode takes place on the rocks of Sandymount Strand, the shoreline that Stephen visited in Episode 3. A young woman, Gerty MacDowell, is seated on the rocks with her two friends, Cissy Caffrey and Edy Boardman. The girls are taking care of three children, a baby, and four-year-old twins named Tommy and Jacky. Gerty contemplates love, marriage and femininity as night falls. The reader is gradually made aware that Bloom is watching her from a distance. Gerty teases the onlooker by exposing her legs and underwear, and Bloom, in turn, masturbates. Bloom's masturbatory climax is echoed by the fireworks at the nearby bazaar. As Gerty leaves, Bloom realises that she has a lame leg, and believes this is the reason she has been "left on the shelf". After several mental digressions he decides to visit Mina Purefoy at the maternity hospital. It is uncertain how much of the episode is Gerty's thoughts, and how much is Bloom's sexual fantasy. Some believe that the episode is divided into two halves: the first half the highly romanticized viewpoint of Gerty, and the other half that of the older and more realistic Bloom. Joyce himself said, however, that "nothing happened between [Gerty and Bloom]. It all took place in Bloom's imagination". Nausicaa attracted immense notoriety while the book was being published in serial form. It has also attracted great attention from scholars of disability in literature. The style of the first half of the episode borrows from (and parodies) romance magazines and novelettes. Bloom's contemplation of Gerty parodies Dedalus's vision of the wading girl at the seashore in A Portrait of the Artist as a Young Man.

==== Episode 14, "Oxen of the Sun" ====
Bloom visits the maternity hospital where Mina Purefoy is giving birth, and finally meets Stephen, who has been drinking with his medical student friends and is awaiting the promised arrival of Buck Mulligan. As the only father in the group of men, Bloom is concerned about Mina Purefoy in her labour. He starts thinking about his wife and the births of his two children. He also thinks about the loss of his only 'heir', Rudy. The young men become boisterous, and start discussing such topics as fertility, contraception and abortion. There is also a suggestion that Milly, Bloom's daughter, is in a relationship with one of the young men, Bannon. They continue on to a pub to continue drinking, following the successful birth of a son to Mina Purefoy. This chapter is remarkable for Joyce's wordplay, which, among other things, recapitulates the entire history of the English language. After a short incantation, the episode starts with latinate prose, Anglo-Saxon alliteration, and moves on through parodies of, among others, Malory, the King James Bible, Bunyan, Pepys, Defoe, Sterne, Walpole, Gibbon, Dickens, and Carlyle, before concluding in a Joycean version of contemporary slang. The development of the English language in the episode is believed to be aligned with the nine-month gestation period of the foetus in the womb.

==== Episode 15, "Circe" ====
Episode 15 is written as a play script, complete with stage directions. The plot is frequently interrupted by "hallucinations" experienced by Stephen and Bloom—fantastic manifestations of the fears and passions of the two characters. Stephen and his friend Lynch walk into Nighttown, Dublin's red-light district. Bloom pursues them and eventually finds them at Bella Cohen's brothel where, in the company of her workers including Zoe Higgins, Florry Talbot and Kitty Ricketts, he has a series of hallucinations regarding his sexual fetishes, fantasies and transgressions. In one of these hallucinations, Bloom is put in the dock to answer charges by a variety of sadistic, accusing women including Mrs Yelverton Barry, Mrs Bellingham and the Hon Mrs Mervyn Talboys. In another of Bloom's hallucinations, he is crowned king of his own city, which is called Bloomusalem—Bloom imagines himself being loved and admired by Bloomusalem's citizens, but then imagines himself being accused of various charges. As a result, he is burnt at the stake and several citizens pay their respects to him as he dies.

Then the hallucination ends, Bloom finds himself next to Zoe, and the two talk. After they talk, Bloom continues to encounter other miscellaneous hallucinations, including one in which he converses with his grandfather Lipoti Virag, who lectures him about sex, among other things. At the end of the hallucination, Bloom is speaking with some prostitutes when he hears a sound coming from downstairs. He hears heels clacking on the staircase, and he observes what appears to be a male form passing down the staircase. He speaks with Zoe and Kitty for a moment, and then sees Bella Cohen come into the brothel. He observes her appearance and talks with her for a little while. But this conversation subsequently begins another hallucination, in which Bloom imagines Bella to be a man named Mr. Bello and Bloom imagines himself to be a woman. In this fantasy, Bloom imagines himself (or "herself", in the hallucination) being dominated by Bello, who both sexually and verbally humiliates Bloom. Bloom also interacts with other imaginary characters in this scene before the hallucination ends.

After the hallucination ends, Bloom sees Stephen overpay at the brothel, and decides to hold onto the rest of Stephen's money for safekeeping. Stephen hallucinates that his mother's rotting cadaver has risen up from the floor to confront him. He cries Non serviam!, uses his walking stick to smash a chandelier, and flees the room. Bloom quickly pays Bella for the damage, then runs after Stephen. He finds Stephen engaged in an argument with an English soldier, Private Carr, who, after hearing Stephen utter a perceived insult to King Edward VII, punches him. The police arrive and the crowd disperses. As Bloom tends to Stephen, he has a hallucination of his deceased son, Rudy, as an 11-year-old.

=== Part III: Nostos ===
==== Episode 16, "Eumaeus" ====
Bloom takes Stephen to a cabman's shelter near Butt Bridge to restore him to his senses. There, they encounter a drunken sailor, D. B. Murphy (W. B. Murphy in the 1922 text). The episode is dominated by the motif of confusion and mistaken identity, with Bloom, Stephen and Murphy's identities being repeatedly called into question. The narrative's rambling and laboured style in this episode reflects the protagonists' nervous exhaustion and confusion.

==== Episode 17, "Ithaca" ====
Bloom returns home with Stephen, makes him a cup of cocoa, discusses cultural and linguistic differences between them, considers the possibility of publishing Stephen's parable stories, and offers him a place to stay for the night. Stephen refuses Bloom's offer and is ambiguous in response to Bloom's proposal of future meetings. The two men urinate in the backyard, Stephen departs and wanders off into the night, and Bloom goes to bed, where Molly is sleeping. She wakes and asks him about his day. The episode is written in the form of a rigidly organised and "mathematical" catechism of 309 questions and answers, and was reportedly Joyce's favourite episode in the novel. The deep descriptions range from questions of astronomy to the trajectory of urination and include a list of 25 men that purports to be the "preceding series" of Molly's suitors and Bloom's reflections on them. While describing events apparently chosen randomly in ostensibly precise mathematical or scientific terms, the episode is rife with errors, many or most of them intentional on Joyce's part.

==== Episode 18, "Penelope" ====
The final episode consists of Molly Bloom's thoughts as she lies in bed next to her husband. The episode uses a stream-of-consciousness technique in eight paragraphs and lacks punctuation. Molly thinks about Boylan and Bloom, her past admirers, including Lieutenant Stanley G. Gardner, the events of the day, her childhood in Gibraltar, and her curtailed singing career. She also hints at a lesbian relationship in her youth with a childhood friend, Hester Stanhope. These thoughts are occasionally interrupted by distractions, such as a train whistle or the need to urinate. Molly is surprised by the early arrival of her menstrual period, which she ascribes to her vigorous sex with Boylan. The episode concludes with Molly's remembrance of Bloom's marriage proposal, and of her acceptance: "he asked me would I yes to say yes my mountain flower and first I put my arms around him yes and drew him down to me so he could feel my breasts all perfume yes and his heart was going like mad and yes I said yes I will Yes."

== Reception ==
=== Censorship ===
Written over a seven-year period from 1914 to 1921, Ulysses was serialised in the American journal The Little Review from 1918 to 1920, when the publication of the "Nausicaa" episode led to a prosecution for obscenity under the Comstock Act of 1873, which made it illegal to circulate materials deemed obscene in the U.S. mail. In 1919, sections of the novel also appeared in the London literary journal The Egoist, but the novel itself was banned in the United Kingdom until 1936. Joyce had resolved that the book would be published on his 40th birthday, 2 February 1922, and Sylvia Beach, Joyce's publisher in Paris, received the first three copies from the printer that morning.

The 1920 prosecution in the US was brought after The Little Review serialised a passage of the book depicting characters masturbating. Three earlier chapters had been banned by the US Post Office, but it was Secretary of the New York Society for the Suppression of Vice John S. Sumner who instigated this legal action. The Post Office did partially suppress the "Nausicaa" edition of The Little Review. Legal historian Edward de Grazia has argued that few readers would have been fully aware of the masturbation in the text, given the metaphoric language. Irene Gammel extends this argument to suggest that the obscenity allegations against The Little Review were influenced by the Baroness Elsa von Freytag-Loringhoven's more explicit poetry, which had appeared alongside the serialisation of Ulysses. At the trial, in 1921, the magazine was declared obscene, and as a result Ulysses was effectively banned in the United States. Throughout the 1920s, the United States Post Office Department burned copies of the novel.

In 1932, Random House and lawyer Morris Ernst arranged to import the French edition and have a copy seized by Customs. Random House contested the seizure, and in United States v. One Book Called Ulysses, U.S. District Judge John M. Woolsey ruled that the book was not pornographic and therefore could not be obscene, a decision Stuart Gilbert called "epoch-making". The Second Circuit Court of Appeals affirmed the ruling in 1934. The U.S. thus became the first English-speaking country where the book was freely available. Although Ireland's Censorship of Publications Board never banned Ulysses, a customs loophole prevented it from being allowed into Ireland. It was first openly available in Ireland in the 1960s.

=== Critical reception ===
In 1922, Ezra Pound wrote, "All men should 'Unite to give praise to Ulysses'; those who will not, may content themselves with a place in the lower intellectual orders." He claimed that in writing Ulysses, "this super-novel", Joyce surpassed Gustave Flaubert, Miguel de Cervantes, Henry James, and Marcel Proust, concluding that, besides François Rabelais, he "can think of no other prose writer whose proportional status in pan-literature is not modified by the advent of Ulysses".

In a 1922 review in The Outlook, the British novelist Arnold Bennett expressed his lack of admiration for Joyce detailing one day in 700 pages. He wrote, "Given sufficient time, paper, childish caprice, and obstinacy, one might easily write over seven thousand pages about twenty hours of life." Bennett also opposed Valery Larbaud's view that Joyce elaborately planned and organized the day he wrote about. He wrote that Joyce "apparently thinks there is something truly artistic and high minded in playing the lout to the innocent and defenseless reader. As a fact, there isn't ... After all, to comprehend Ulysses is not among the recognized learned professions, and nobody should give his entire existence to the job." Bennett acknowledged that Joyce's "verbal method can be justified" since he is "trying to reproduce the thoughts of personage", but called the details "trivial and perfectly futile in the narrative".

In April 1922, writing in The Nation and Athenaeum, English writer John Middleton Murry called Joyce "a genius of the very highest order, strictly comparable to Goethe or Dostoevsky…Ulysses is, fundamentally (though it is much else besides), an immense, a prodigious self-laceration, the tearing away from himself, by a half-demented man of genius, of inhibitions and limitations which have grown to be flesh of his flesh…Mr. Joyce has made the superhuman effort to empty the whole of his consciousness into it…[But he has become] the victim of his own anarchy….[Joyce] is the man with the bomb who would blow what remains of Europe into the sky…This transcendental buffoonery, this sudden uprush of the vis comica into a world where in the tragic incompatibility of the practical and the instinctive is embodied, is a very great achievement."

The next month, in the Sunday Express, newspaper editor James Douglas called Ulysses "the most infamously obscene book in ancient or modern literature. ... All the secret sewers of vice are canalized in its flood of unimaginable thoughts, images and pornographic words. And its unclean lunacies are larded with appalling and revolting blasphemies directed against the Christian religion and against the name of Christ—blasphemies hitherto associated with the most degraded orgies of Satanism and the Black Mass."

In a 1922 review in The New Republic, literary critic Edmund Wilson wrote, "Ulysses is a work of high genius. Its importance seems to me to lie ... in its once more setting the standard of the novel so high that it need not be ashamed to take its place beside poetry and drama. Ulysses has the effect at once of making everything else look brassy. Since I have read it, the texture of other novelists seems intolerably loose and careless; when I come suddenly unawares upon a page that I have written myself I quake like a guilty thing surprised. ... Who else has had the supreme devotion and accomplished the definitive beauty? If he has really laid down his pen never to take it up again he must know that the hand which laid it down upon the great affirmative of Mrs. Bloom, though it never write another word, is already the hand of a master."

In a 1922 review in The New York Times, Joseph Collins wrote, "Ulysses is the most important contribution that has been made to fictional literature in the twentieth century. ... It is likely that there is no one writing English today that could parallel Mr. Joyce's feat, and it is also likely that few would care to do it were they capable. ... When a master technician of words and phrases sets himself the task of revealing the product of the unconscious mind of a moral monster, a pervert and an invert, an apostate to his race and his religion, the simulacrum of a man who has neither cultural background nor personal self-respect, who can neither be taught by experience nor lessoned by example, as Mr. Joyce has done in drawing the picture of Leopold Bloom, and giving a faithful reproduction of his thoughts, purposeful, vagrant and obsessive, he undoubtedly knew full well what he was undertaking, and how unacceptable the vile contents of that unconscious mind would be to ninety-nine men out of a hundred, and how incensed they would be at having the disgusting product thrown in their faces. But that has nothing to do with that with which I am here concerned, viz., has the job been done well and is it a work of art, to which there can be only an affirmative answer."

In 1922, the writer and Irish nationalist Shane Leslie called Ulysses "literary Bolshevism ... experimental, anti-conventional, anti-Christian, chaotic, totally unmoral". In the same year, Sisley Huddleston wrote in The Observer: "I confess that I cannot see how the work upon which Mr Joyce spent seven strenuous years, years of wrestling and of agony, can ever be given to the public. ... This is undoubtedly an obscene book; but that, says Mr Joyce, is not his fault. If the thoughts of men and women are such as may be properly described as obscene then how can you show what life is unless you put in the obscenity." Molly Bloom's monologue, Leslie wrote, is "the vilest [chapter] according to ordinary standards, in all literature. And yet its very obscenity is somehow beautiful and wrings the soul to pity. Is that not high art? I cannot, however, believe that sex plays such a preponderant part in life as Mr Joyce represents. He may aim at putting everything in, but he has, of course, like everybody else, selected carefully what he puts in. Has he not exaggerated the vulgarity and magnified the madness of mankind and the mysterious materiality of the universe?"

In a 1923 review, Virginia Woolf wrote, "Ulysses was a memorable catastrophe—immense in daring, terrific in disaster." In The Dial the same year, T. S. Eliot wrote: "I hold [Ulysses] to be the most important expression which the present age has found; it is a book to which we are all indebted, and from which none of us can escape." He added that Joyce was not at fault if people after him did not understand it: "The next generation is responsible for its own soul; a man of genius is responsible to his peers, not to a studio full of uneducated and undisciplined coxcombs."

In his 1930 book-length study of the novel, Stuart Gilbert said that the "personages of Ulysses are not fictitious" but that "these people are as they must be; they act, we see, according to some lex eterna, an ineluctable condition of their very existence". Through these characters Joyce "achieves a coherent and integral interpretation of life".

In Axel's Castle (1931), Edmund Wilson noted that Ulysses attempts to render "as precisely and as directly as it is possible in words to do, what our participation in life is like—or rather, what it seems to us like as from moment to moment we live".

Addressing the first All-Union Congress of Soviet Writers in 1934, the writer and communist revolutionary Karl Radek called Ulysses "a heap of dung, crawling with worms, photographed by a cinema camera through a microscope". Writing in America magazine that year, Francis X. Talbot vehemently decried Judge Woolsey's recent decision that Ulysses was not obscene, adding, "Only a person who had been a Catholic, only one with an incurably diseased mind, could be so diabolically venomous toward God, toward the Blessed Sacrament, toward the Virgin Mary."

In Irish Literary Portraits (1935), John Eglinton characterized Ulysses as an act of revenge: "I am convinced that the only person concerned in the narrative who comes out as a real hero is the author himself. What kind of hero after all is brought to mind by the name Ulysses if not a hero long absent from his kingdom, returning, after being the sport of the gods for ten years, in triumph and vengeance? And it was after nearly as many years of absence as Ulysses from the country 'which belonged to him' that Joyce turned up again for us in Dublin, with a vengeance! ... Endued ... with the elemental diabolism of Ulysses, he was transfigured. A thousand unexpected faculties and gay devices were liberated in his soul. The discovery of a new method in literary art, in which the pen is no longer the slave of logic and rhetoric, made of this Berlitz School teacher a kind of public danger, threatening to the corporate existence of 'literature' as established in the minds and affections of the older generation. ... Our Romano-Celtic Joyce nurses an ironic detachment from the whole of the English tradition. Indeed, he is its enemy. ... It must have seemed to him that he held English, his country's spiritual enemy, in the hollow of his hand, for the English language too came at his call to do his bidding. ... This language found itself constrained by its new master to perform tasks to which it was unaccustomed in the service of pure literature; against the grain it was forced to reproduce Joyce's fantasies in all kinds of juxtapositions, neologisms, amalgamations, truncations, words that are only found scrawled up in public lavatories, obsolete words, words in limbo or belike in the womb of time."

In a 1946 essay, Irene Hendry identified four distinct epiphany techniques in Joyce's work, noting their use in Ulysses, from the simplest device, such as the revelation of Gerty Macdowell's limp, to the more complex, such as the bowl symbolism in "Telemachus". Cited as an example of Joyce's major epiphany technique—quidditas produced directly—is the revelation of Molly Bloom as "female essence".

In his first book on Joyce, the American scholar William York Tindall wrote, "Since the naturalists tried to establish reality, they were descriptive. Before perfecting his art, Joyce tried this method. The Dublin of Dubliners and its people are described. But almost abandoning description in Ulysses Joyce evoked place and people. He established his characters by what they say; and his places, named but not described, live in the minds of his characters. Yet no place is more solid than Joyce's Dublin and no characters are more substantial. During his walk along the beach, Stephen exercises his descriptive powers on what he sees and hears. Gerty MacDowell's scene, which concerns the eye, is suitably pictorial. The catalogue of externals in Mr. Bloom's parlor is not naturalistic but a parody of naturalism and its reduction to absurdity. ... Joyce did not approach things directly like a naturalist but indirectly, through correspondence or analogy, as a symbolist."

In his second book on Joyce, Tindall wrote, "It is certain that, careful of external details, Joyce observed his city as a naturalist would. ... Yet, in Ulysses, as in the earlier works, he used these particulars to suggest inner or general things—in the manner of Baudelaire and Flaubert. Such usage is symbolist; for a symbol is a common thing, closely observed, suggesting other things. An observer of things, Joyce saw something else within them and beyond, something they embodied and showed forth. That much is plain, let critics quarrel as they will. And it is plain that, however reliant upon details of Dublin, Joyce called again upon parallel and motif to enlarge his particulars and hold them together. ... The riddling motifs of Ulysses are complicated in turn by allusion, quotation, and single images or charged words—like those in A Portrait or, better, since Ulysses is a kind of poem, like those in 'The Love Song of J. Alfred Prufrock'."

In his book-length study of Ulysses (1961), the Australian scholar S. L. Goldberg argued that interior monologue in Ulysses was rooted in Joyce's epiphany technique. For Goldberg, the epiphany is "the real artistic (and dramatic) unit of Joyce's 'stream-of-consciousness' writing. What he renders dramatically are minds engaged in the apprehension of epiphanies—the elements of meaning apprehended in life."

In a 1965 interview, novelist Vladimir Nabokov called Ulysses "a divine work of art [that] will live on despite the academic nonentities who turn it into a collection of symbols or Greek myths." He named it the greatest masterpiece of 20th-century prose. In a 1966 interview, he said, "it towers above the rest of Joyce's writing" with "noble originality and unique lucidity of thought and style".

Psychology professor Charles Fernyhough called Ulysses "the archetypal stream of consciousness novel".

Joyce uses "metaphors, symbols, ambiguities, and overtones which gradually link themselves together so as to form a network of connections binding the whole" work. This system of connections gives the novel a wide, more universal significance, as "Leopold Bloom becomes a modern Ulysses, an Everyman in a Dublin which becomes a microcosm of the world."

The American author Michael Chabon wrote, "Ulysses struck me, most of all, as a book of life; every sentence, even those that laid bare the doubt, despair, shame, or vanity of its characters, seemed to have been calibrated to assert, in keeping with the project of the work as a whole, the singularity and worth of even the most humdrum and throwaway of human days."

Time Magazine, Modern Library, Folha de S.Paulo and CounterPunch have all published lists ranking Ulysses as the greatest novel of the 20th century.

== Publication history ==
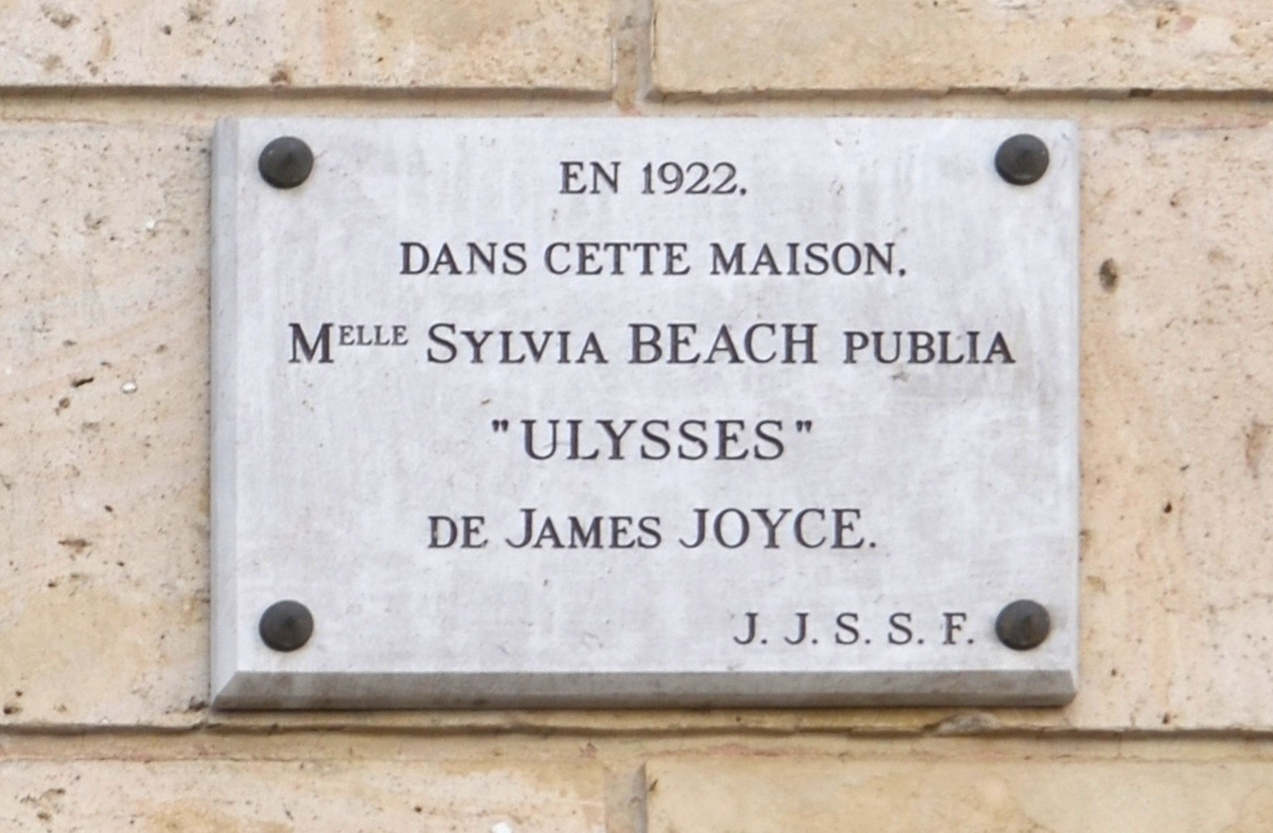
Memorial plaque, at 12 Rue de l'Odéon, Paris (the original location of Shakespeare and Company): "In 1922, in this house, Sylvia Beach published Ulysses by James Joyce. J.J.S.S.F." (James Joyce Society of Sweden and Finland)

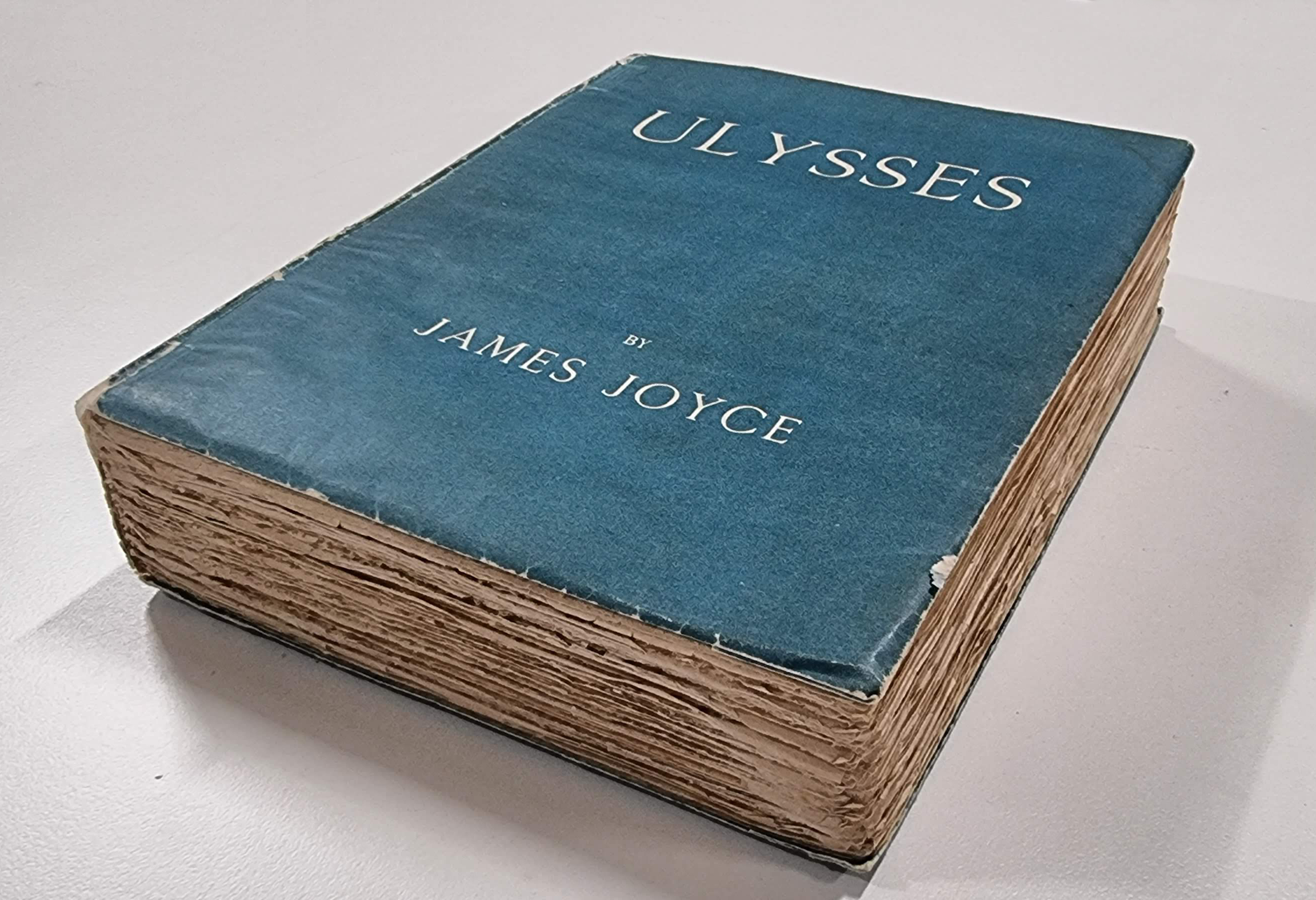
Ulysses by James Joyce, Paris : Shakespeare, 1922

The publication history of Ulysses is complex. There have been at least 18 editions, and variations among different impressions of each edition.

According to Joyce scholar Jack Dalton, the first edition of Ulysses contained over 2,000 errors. As subsequent editions attempted to correct these mistakes, they would often add more, due in part to the difficulty of separating non-authorial errors from Joyce's deliberate "errors" devised to challenge the reader.

Notable editions include: (Note: Where the title is omitted the edition is titled Ulysses.)

- Paris: Shakespeare and Company, 1922: The private, first edition published in Paris on 2 February 1922 (Joyce's 40th birthday) by Sylvia Beach's Shakespeare and Company. Beach commissioned Maurice Darantiere in Dijon to print 1,000 numbered copies consisting of 100 signed copies on Dutch handmade paper (350 francs), 150 numbered copies on vergé d'Arches paper (250 francs), and 750 copies on handmade paper (150 francs), plus an extra 20 unnumbered copies on mixed paper for libraries and press.
- London: Egoist Press, 1922: The first English edition published by Harriet Shaw Weaver's Egoist Press in October 1922. For legal reasons the book was printed on behalf of Egoist Press by John Rodker using the same printer, Darantiere, and plates as the first edition. This edition consisted of 2,000 numbered copies on handmade paper for sale plus 100 unnumbered copies for press, publicity and legal deposit libraries. A seven-page errata list compiled by Joyce, Weaver and Rodker was loosely inserted and contained 201 corrections. The U.S. Post Office reportedly burned up to 500 copies, as noted in later Shakespeare and Company editions.
- New York: Two Worlds Publishing Company, 1929: The first U.S. edition of the novel was pirated by Samuel Roth without Joyce's authorisation, and first published serially in Roth's Two Worlds Monthly, then later in a single volume in 1929. It was designed to closely mimic the 1927 Shakespeare and Company 9th printing but many errors and corruptions occurred during reproduction. Reportedly 2,000–3,000 copies were printed but the majority were seized and destroyed by the New York Society for the Suppression of Vice after a raid on Roth's offices on 4 October 1929
- Hamburg: Odyssey Press, 1932: In two volumes. The title page of this edition states "The present edition may be regarded as the definitive standard edition, as it has been specially revised, at the author's request, by Stuart Gilbert." This edition still contained errors but by its fourth revised printing (April 1939) it was considered the most accurate offering of the text and subsequently used as the basis for many later editions of the novel.
- New York: Random House, 1934: The first authorised U.S. edition, published after the decision in United States v. One Book Called Ulysses finding that the book was not obscene. Random House's founder Bennett Cerf chose to base this edition on a copy of the pirated Samuel Roth edition of 1929, which led it to reproduce many of that edition's errors.
- London: Bodley Head, 1936: The first edition printed and published in England. Set from the second impression of Odyssey Press's edition and purportedly proofed by Joyce.
- Bodley Head, 1960: Newly reset corrected edition based on the 1958 impression of the earlier Bodley Head edition. The source for many later editions by other publishers.
- Random House, 1961: Reset from the 1960 Bodley Head edition.
- Ulysses: A Critical and Synoptic Edition. Garland, 1984: Edited by Hans Walter Gabler.
- Ulysses: A Reader's Edition. Lilliput Press, 1997: Edited by Danis Rose.

=== "Joyce Wars" ===
Hans Walter Gabler's 1984 edition was the most sustained attempt to produce a corrected text, but it has received much criticism, most notably from John Kidd. Kidd's main theoretical criticism is of Gabler's choice of a patchwork of manuscripts as his copy-text (the base edition with which the editor compares each variant).

In June 1988, Kidd published "The Scandal of Ulysses" in The New York Review of Books, charging that not only did Gabler's changes overturn Joyce's last revisions, but in another 400 places Gabler failed to follow any manuscript whatever, making nonsense of his own premises. Kidd accused Gabler of unnecessarily changing Joyce's spelling, punctuation, use of accents, and all the details he claimed to have been restoring. Instead, Gabler was actually following printed editions such as that of 1932, not the manuscripts. Gabler was found to have made genuine blunders, such as his changing the name of the real-life Dubliner Harry Thrift to "Shrift" and cricketer Captain Buller to "Culler" on the basis of handwriting irregularities in the extant manuscript. (Gabler undid these "corrections" in 1986.) Kidd said that many of Gabler's errors resulted from his use of facsimiles rather than original manuscripts.

In December 1988, in "The New Ulysses: The Hidden Controversy", Charles Rossman revealed that some of Gabler's own advisers felt that too many changes were being made, but that the publishers were pushing for as many alterations as possible. Then Kidd produced a 174-page critique that filled an entire issue of the Papers of the Bibliographical Society of America, dated the same month. Kidd's James Joyce Research Center at Boston University published this "Inquiry into Ulysses: The Corrected Text" the next year in book format and on floppy disk.

Gabler and others, including Michael Groden, have rejected Kidd's critique. In his 1993 afterword to the Gabler edition, Groden writes that Kidd's lists of supposed errors were constructed "with so little demonstrated understanding of Gabler's theoretical assumptions and procedures ... that they can point to errors or misjudgments only by accident". The scholarly community remains divided.

=== Gabler edition replaced ===
In 1990, Gabler's US publisher, Random House, after consulting a committee of scholars, replaced the Gabler edition with its 1961 version, and in the United Kingdom the Bodley Head press revived its 1960 version (upon which Random House's 1961 version is based). In both the UK and US, Everyman's Library also republished the 1960 Ulysses. In 1992, Penguin dropped Gabler and reprinted the 1960 text. The Gabler version remained available from Vintage International. Reprints of the 1922 first edition have also become widely available since 2012, when it entered the public domain under US copyright law.

In 1992, W. W. Norton announced that it would publish Kidd's much-anticipated edition of Ulysses as part of "The Dublin Edition of the Works of James Joyce" series. This book had to be withdrawn when the Joyce estate objected. For a period thereafter the estate refused to authorise any further editions of Joyce's work. This ended when it agreed to allow Wordsworth Editions to bring out a bargain version (a reprint of the 1932 Odyssey Press edition) in 2010, ahead of copyright expiration in 2012.

== Media adaptations ==
=== Theatre ===
Ulysses in Nighttown, based on Episode 15 ("Circe"), premiered off-Broadway in 1958, with Zero Mostel as Bloom; it debuted on Broadway in 1974.

In 1960, London's Unity Theatre staged Bloomsday, an adaptation by Allan McClelland (who also directed) with sets and lighting by Sean Kenny. Joe MacColum played Bloom, with Helen Gold as Molly, Denys Hawthorne as Dedalus, and Michael Gambon as Mulligan.

In 2006, playwright Sheila Callaghan's Dead City, a contemporary stage adaptation of the book set in New York City, and featuring the male figures Bloom and Dedalus reimagined as female characters Samantha Blossom and Jewel Jupiter, was produced in Manhattan by New Georges.

In 2012, an adaption was staged in Glasgow, written by Dermot Bolger and directed by Andy Arnold. The production first premiered at the Tron Theatre, and later toured in Dublin, Belfast, Cork, made an appearance at the Edinburgh Festival, and was performed in China. In 2017 a revised version of Bolger's adaption, directed and designed by Graham McLaren, premiered at Ireland's national theatre, the Abbey Theatre in Dublin, as part of the 2017 Dublin Theatre Festival. It was revived in June 2018, and the script was published by Oberon Books.

In 2013, a new stage adaptation of the novel, Gibraltar, was produced in New York by the Irish Repertory Theatre. It was written by and starred Patrick Fitzgerald and directed by Terry Kinney. This two-person play focused on the love story of Bloom and Molly, played by Cara Seymour.

=== Film ===
In 1967, a film version of the book was directed by Joseph Strick. Starring Milo O'Shea as Bloom, it was nominated for an Academy Award for Best Adapted Screenplay.

In 2003, a movie version, Bloom, was released starring Stephen Rea and Angeline Ball.

=== Television ===
In 1988, the episode "James Joyce's Ulysses" of the documentary series The Modern World: Ten Great Writers was shown on Channel 4. Some of the novel's scenes were dramatised. David Suchet played Leopold Bloom.

In September 2022, the episode "James Joyce's Ulysses" of the documentary series Arena, was shown on BBC.

=== Audio ===
On Bloomsday 1982, RTÉ, Ireland's national broadcaster, aired a full-cast, unabridged, dramatised radio production of Ulysses, that ran uninterrupted for 29 hours and 45 minutes.

The unabridged text of Ulysses has been performed by Jim Norton with Marcella Riordan. Naxos Records released the recording on 22 audio CDs in 2004. It follows an earlier abridged recording with the same actors. Both recordings were directed by the composer Roger Marsh, who has also produced an unabridged audiobook of Finnegans Wake.

On Bloomsday 2010, author Frank Delaney launched a series of weekly podcasts called Re:Joyce that took listeners page by page through Ulysses, discussing its allusions, historical context and references. The podcast ran until Delaney's death in 2017, at which point it was on the "Wandering Rocks" chapter.

BBC Radio 4 aired a new nine-part adaptation dramatised by Robin Brooks and produced/directed by Jeremy Mortimer, and starring Stephen Rea as the Narrator, Henry Goodman as Bloom, Niamh Cusack as Molly and Andrew Scott as Dedalus, for Bloomsday 2012, beginning on 16 June 2012.

Comedy/satire recording troupe The Firesign Theatre ends its 1969 album "How Can You Be in Two Places at Once When You're Not Anywhere at All?" with a male voice reciting the final lines of Molly Bloom's soliloquy.

=== Music ===
Thema (Omaggio a Joyce) is an electroacoustic composition for voice and tape by Luciano Berio. Composed between 1958 and 1959, it is based on an interpretative reading of the novel's "Sirens" chapter, as sung/voiced by his then wife Cathy Berberian. Umberto Eco, a lifelong admirer of Joyce, also contributed to its realisation. Berio's Epifanie (1961/65) also includes texts from Ulysses.

References to Molly's infidelities with Boylan and Bloom's sleeping posture, as related in her monologue in the "Penelope" chapter, appear in Grace Slick's song "Rejoyce", the last track on Jefferson Airplane's 1967 album After Bathing at Baxter's.

Anthony Burgess composed the operetta Blooms of Dublin in 1982, as a very free interpretation of Joyce's text. It was televised by the BBC, to mixed reviews.

The Radiators from Space released a song Kitty Ricketts on their album Ghostown (1979), in which the ghost of one of the prostitutes from Bella Cohen's brothel haunts modern Dublin.

Kate Bush's 1989 song "The Sensual World" (the title track of her album of the same name) is based on Molly Bloom's soliloquy and uses several phrases such as "mmm yes". Bush wanted to use the soliloquy's actual words, but the Joyce family refused her request. While preparing Director's Cut (2011), an album of re-recordings, she again asked the Joyce family for permission to use the soliloquy, and her request was granted. She renamed the song "Flower of the Mountain" and used sections of the soliloquy.

The James Joyce Society in Dublin released the album Classical Ulysses for the Bloomsday100 celebrations in 2004. It contains recordings of the classical music mentioned in the book.

=== Prose ===
Jacob M. Appel's novel The Biology of Luck (2013) is a retelling of Ulysses set in New York City. It features an inept tour guide, Larry Bloom, whose adventures parallel those of Leopold Bloom through Dublin.

=== Comics ===
A comic-book adaptation by Nicolas Mahler was published in German in 2020 and in English translation in 2022.

=== The Ulysses Project ===
In 2020, during COVID-19 pandemic in the Republic of Ireland, actor and filmmaker Laoisa Sexton created The Ulysses Project, a work of digital theatre shot entirely during lockdown. A low-tech retelling of Ulysses, The Ulysses Project featured an ensemble of over 85 actors who filmed themselves on phones or webcam, while being directed via WhatsApp. The cast included Gina Costigan, Olwen Fouéré, Shane MacGowan, Paula Meehan, and Barry Ward. The Ulysses Project was later screened by the Irish Film Institute as part of their Bloomsday Centennial celebration.

== List of editions in print ==
=== Facsimile texts of the manuscript ===
- Ulysses, a three-volume facsimile copy of the complete, handwritten manuscript. Introduction by Harry Levin; bibliographical preface by Clive Driver. Philip H. &. A.S.W. Rosenbach Foundation (now known as the Rosenbach Museum & Library). New York: Octagon Books (1975).

Serial text published in the Little Review, 1918–1920

- The Little Review Ulysses, edited by Mark Gaipa, Sean Latham and Robert Scholes, Yale University Press, 2015. ISBN 978-0-300-18177-7

=== Facsimile texts of the 1922 first edition ===
- Ulysses, The 1922 Text, with an introduction and notes by Jeri Johnson, Oxford University Press (1993). ISBN 0-19-282866-5
- Ulysses: A Facsimile of the First Edition Published in Paris in 1922, Orchises Press (1998). ISBN 978-0-914061-70-0
- Ulysses: With a new Introduction by Enda Duffy – An unabridged republication of the original Shakespeare and Company edition, published in Paris by Sylvia Beach, 1922, Dover Publications (2009). ISBN 978-0-486-47470-0
- The Cambridge Centenary Ulysses: The 1922 Text with Essays and Notes, edited by Catherne Flynn, Cambridge University Press (2022). ISBN 9781316515945

=== Based on the 1932 Odyssey Press edition ===
- Ulysses, Wordsworth Classics (2010). Introduction by Cedric Watts. ISBN 978-1-840-22635-5

=== Based on the 1939 Odyssey Press edition ===
- Ulysses, Alma Classics (2012), with an introduction and notes by Sam Slote, Trinity College, Dublin. ISBN 978-1-84749-399-6

=== Based on the 1960 Bodley Head/1961 Random House editions ===
- Ulysses, Vintage International (1990). ISBN 978-0-679-72276-2
- Ulysses: Annotated Student's Edition, with an introduction and notes by Declan Kiberd, Penguin Twentieth Century Classics (1992). ISBN 978-0-141-18443-2
- Ulysses: The 1934 Text, As Corrected and Reset in 1961, Modern Library (1992). Foreword by Morris L. Ernst. ISBN 978-0-679-60011-4
- Ulysses, Everyman's Library (1997). ISBN 978-1-85715-100-8
- Ulysses, Penguin Modern Classics (2000). Introduction by Declan Kiberd. ISBN 978-0-14118-280-3

=== Based on the 1984 Gabler edition ===
- Ulysses: The corrected text, edited by Hans Walter Gabler with Wolfhard Steppe and Claus Melchior; preface by Richard Ellmann, Vintage International (1986). This follows the disputed Garland Edition. ISBN 978-0-39474-312-7

== See also ==
- Joyce Trail, a set of bronze plaques set into the streets of Dublin which follow Bloom's route from Chapter 8, 'Lestrygonians'

== Works cited ==
- Life of Saint Margaret Mary Alacoque, written by herself, trans. The Sisters of the Visitation. Roseland, Walmer, Kent: Visitation Library. 1952
- Aquinas, Thomas. Of God and His Creatures: An Annotated Translation (With some abridgement) of the "Summa contra Gentiles" of St. Thomas Aquinas by Joseph Rickaby, S.J. London: Burns & Oates,1905.
- Atherton, James (1966). "The Joyce of Dubliners". In Staley, Thomas (ed.). James Joyce Today: Essays on the Major Works. Bloomington: Indiana University Press.
- Barnes, Djuna (April 1922). "James Joyce: A Portrait of the Man Who is, at Present, One of the More Significant Figures in Literature." Vanity Fair.
- Beebe, Maurice (Fall 1972). "Ulysses and the Age of Modernism". James Joyce Quarterly. 10 (1). University of Tulsa: 172–188. JSTOR 25487031.
- Blamires, Harry. The Bloomsday Book: A Guide through "Ulysses". London: Methuen. 1966
- Blamires, Harry. The New Bloomsday Book. 3rd ed. Routledge, 1996. ISBN 0415138582
- Blamires, Harry. A Short History of English Literature, Routledge. 2d edition, 2013.
- Borach, Georges. Conversations with James Joyce, translated by Joseph Prescott, College English, 15 (March 1954)
- Burgess, Anthony. Here Comes Everybody: An Introduction to James Joyce for the Ordinary Reader (1965); also published as Re Joyce.
- Burgess, Anthony. Joysprick: An Introduction to the Language of James Joyce (1973).
- Burgess, Anthony. Re Joyce. New York: W. W. Norton, 1965.
- Budgen, Frank. James Joyce and the Making of "Ulysses". Bloomington: Indiana University Press, (1960).
- Budgen, Frank (1972). James Joyce and the making of 'Ulysses', and other writings. Oxford University Press. ISBN 0-19-211713-0.
- Dalton, Jack. The Text of Ulysses in Fritz Senn, ed. New Light on Joyce from the Dublin Symposium. Indiana University Press (1972).
- Devotions to the Sacred Heart of Jesus. Trans. from the French and rev. by the Rev. Joseph Joy Dean, ed. Dublin: Richard Grace. 1841.
- Duncan, Edward. "Unsubstantial Father: A Study of the Hamlet Symbolism in Joyce's Ulysses". University of Toronto Quarterly. 19.2 (January 1950): 126–40.
- Ellmann, Richard. The Consciousness of Joyce. Oxford University Press, 1977. ISBN 0195199502
- Ellmann, Richard. Four Dubliners. W. W. Norton, 1988. ISBN 0807612081
- Ellmann, Richard (1982). James Joyce (revised ed.). New York: Oxford University Press. ISBN 0-19-503103-2.
- Ellmann, Richard. Letters of James Joyce. Volume II. London: Faber and Faber, 1966.
- Ellmann, Richard, ed. Selected Letters of James Joyce. The Viking Press (1975).
- Ellmann, Richard (1972). Ulysses on the Liffey. London: Faber and Faber. ISBN 0195016637.
- Freud, Sigmund. Leonardo da Vinci and a Memory of His Childhood. Translated by Alan Tyson 1910 in Art and Literature, edited by Albert Dickson, vol. 14 of The Pelican Freud Library, 143–231. Middlesex: Penguin, 1985.
- Gilbert, Stuart. James Joyce's Ulysses: A Study, Faber and Faber (1930).
- Gorman, Herbert. James Joyce: A Definitive Biography (1939).
- Gorman, Herbert. James Joyce: His First Forty Years. London: Geoffrey Bles, 1926.
- Gose, Jr., Elliott B. (1980). The Transformation Process in Joyce's "Ulysses.". University of Toronto Press. ISBN 0-8020-5492-7.
- Hardiman, Adrian (2017). Joyce in Court. London: Head of Zeus Press. ISBN 978-1786691583.
- Joseph M. Hassett The Ulysses Trials: Beauty and Truth Meet the Law. Dublin: The Lilliput Press (2016). ISBN 978-1-84351-668-2.
- Hitchens, Christopher (May 2011). "Joyce in Bloom". Vanity Fair. Retrieved 20 April 2024.
- Joyce, James (1989) [1959]. Mason, Ellsworth; Ellmann, Richard (eds.). The Critical Writings of James Joyce. Cornell University Press. ISBN 0-8014-9587-3. OCLC 756438802.
- Kennedy, Eileen (Spring 1969) . "Another Root for Bloomsday?" James Joyce Quarterly. 6 (3) University of Tulsa. 271–72.
- Kenner, Hugh (1955). Dublin's Joyce. Chatto & Windus.
- Kenner, Hugh (1982). Ulysses. Unwin Critical Library. Allen & Unwin. ISBN 0048000086.
- Kenner, Hugh (1987). "Ulysses". Baltimore and London: The Johns Hopkins University Press. pp. 19–30. ISBN 0801834899.
- Klein, A. M. "The Black Panther: A Study in Technique." Literary Essays and Reviews. University of Toronto Press, 1987. 326–42.
- Lang, Frederick K. "Ulysses" and the Irish God. Bucknell University Press,1993. ISBN 0838751504
- Lang, Frederick K. (Winter 1989). "A Liturgical Nexus Early in Joyce". Journal of Ritual Studies. 3 (1): 91–108. JSTOR 44368407.
- Lercaro, Giacomo (1959). A Small Liturgical Dictionary. London: Burns & Oates.
- Managaniello, Dominic. Joyce's Politics. London: Routledge, 1980.
- McCourt, John (2000). James Joyce: A Passionate Exile. London: Orion Books Ltd. ISBN 0-7528-1829-5.
- McCourt, John (2000). The Years of Bloom: James Joyce in Trieste, 1904-1920. Lilliput Press. p. 61. ISBN 978-1-901866-45-2.
- Michelet, Jules. Satanism and Witchcraft: A Study in Medieval Superstition. New York: The Ciradel Press, 1939.
- Mulllin, Katherine. "'Something in the Name of Araby': James Joyce and the Irish Bazaars". Dublin James Joyce Journal. 4 November 2011. 31–50.
- Nabokov, Vladimir (1990). Strong Opinions. New York: Random House. ISBN 0-679-72609-8.
- Pound, Ezra. "Ulysses and Mr James Joyce": Literary Essays of Ezra Pound. London: Faber and Faber, 1935. 403–409.
- Power, Arthur. (Fall 1965) "Conversations with Joyce". James Joyce Quarterly 3 (1): 41–49.
- Restuccia, Frances L. "Transubstantiating 'Ulysses.'" James Joyce Quarterly. Summer 1984. 21 (4): 329–40.
- Reynolds, Mary T. Joyce and Dante: The Shaping Imagination. Princeton University Press, 1981.ISBN 978-0-691-06446-8
- Ryan, Sean Michael. "Heart of Europe: The Sacred Heart Image and Irish-Catholic Self-identity". Religion in Cultural Imaginary: Explorations in Visual and Material Practices. Daria Pezzoli-Olgiati, ed. Nomos Verlag, 2015
- Scholes, Robert and Richard M. Kain eds. The Workshop of Daedalus: James Joyce and the Raw Materials for "A Portrait of the Artist as a Young Man"Northwestern University Press, 1965. pp 56–68.ISBN 3845264063
- Schutte, William M. Joyce and Shakespeare: A Study in the Meaning of "Ulysses". New Haven: Yale University Press, 1957.
- Seidel, Michael. Epic Geography: James Joyce's "Ulysses". Princeton University Press, 2014. ISBN 0691610665
- Sicker, Philip (Summer 2003). "Unveiling Desire: Pleasure, Power and Masquerade in Joyce's 'Nausicaa' Episode". Joyce Studies Annual. 14:92–131.
- Slocum, John; Cahoon, Herbert (1953). A Bibliography of James Joyce [1882–1941]. New Haven, Conn.: Yale University Press.
- Smith, Michelle. "On Bloomsday, you can thank the Catholic Church for the humor in James Joyce's 'Ulysses'". America. 16 June 2021.
- Talbot, Francis X. "An American Jesuit on James Joyce's 'Ulysses': obscene, blasphemous and 'against the natural law'". America 1 September 1934.
- Tindall, William York, A Reader's Guide to James Joyce. London: Thames and Hudson, 1959. Syracuse University Press, 1995. ISBN 0815603207
- Tindall, William York. James Joyce: His Way of Interpreting the Modern World. New York: Charles Scribner's Sons, 1950
- Torchiana, Donald T. (1968). "Joyce's 'Eveline' and the Blessed Margaret Mary Alacoque". James Joyce Quarterly. 6 (1) University of Tulsa. 22–28.
- Thornton, Weldon. Allusions in Ulysses: An Annotated List. Chapel Hill: University of North Carolina Press, 1968 and 1973. ISBN 978-0-8078-4089-4.
- van Luijk, Ruben. "A Brief History of the Black Mass." Sanctifying Texts, Transforming Rituals. Brill, 2017. ISBN 9004347089
- Walsh, Ruth M. (Summer 1969). "In the Name of the Father and of the Son... Joyce's Use of the Mass in Ulysses". James Joyce Quarterly. 6 (4):321-47.
