= John Kidd =

John Kidd is the name of:

- John Kidd (American football) (born 1961), punter for five teams
- John Kidd (chemist) (1775–1851), English physician, chemist and geologist
- John Kidd (footballer) (born 1936), footballer for Tranmere Rovers
- John Kidd (Paralympian) (1947–2016), Australian Paralympic athletics and wheelchair basketball competitor
- John Kidd (politician) (1838–1919), Australian politician
- John Kidd (actor) (1907–1995), British actor in When the Boat Comes In
- John G. Kidd (1908–1991), American physician, pathologist, and virologist
- John Kidd (scholar), American literary scholar

== See also ==
- John Kid
- Johnny Kidd (disambiguation)
- Jack Kidd (disambiguation)
