= Linati =

Linati (Italian pronunciation: [liˈnaːti]) is an Italian surname. Notable people with this surname include:

- Claudio Linati (1790–1832), Italian painter and lithographer
- Giovanni Linati (1562–1627), Italian bishop

== See also ==
- Linati schema for Ulysses
