= Jack Kidd =

Jack Kidd may refer to:

- Jack Kidd (Scottish footballer) (1884–?), Scottish football inside forward
- Jack Kidd (Australian footballer) (1908–1960), Australian rules footballer
- Jack Kidd (New Zealand footballer), former association football player who represented New Zealand

== See also ==
- John Kidd (disambiguation)
