= Gilbert schema for Ulysses =

Schema for the novel Ulysses

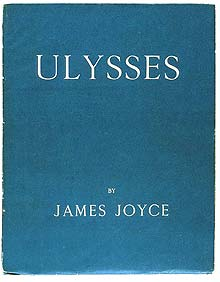
It’s a picture of a book cover of Ulysses

This schema for the novel Ulysses was produced by its author, James Joyce, in November 1921 in order to help his friend, Valery Larbaud, prepare a public lecture on the novel, which Joyce was still writing at the time. The lecture took place on 7 December 1921 at the Maison des Amis des Livres bookshop and lending library, owned and run by Adrienne Monnier. The schema was shown to intimates of Joyce during the 1920s and was eventually published by Stuart Gilbert in 1930 in his book, James Joyce’s “Ulysses”: A Study. Gilbert’s typed copy of the schema is housed in the Harley K. Croessmann Collection of James Joyce at Southern Illinois University Carbondale.

| Title | Scene | Hour | Organ | Colour | Symbol | Art | Technic |
|---|---|---|---|---|---|---|---|
| Telemachus | The Tower | 8am | - | White / gold | Heir | Theology | Narrative (young) |
| Nestor | The School | 10am | - | Brown | Horse | History | Catechism (personal) |
| Proteus | The Strand | 11am | - | Green | Tide | Philology | Monologue (male) |
| Calypso | The House | 8am | Kidney | Orange | Nymph | Economics | Narrative (mature) |
| Lotus Eaters | The Bath | 10am | Genitals | - | Eucharist | Botany / chemistry | Narcissism |
| Hades | The Graveyard | 11am | Heart | White / black | Caretaker | Religion | Incubism |
| Aeolus | The Newspaper | 12 noon | Lungs | Red | Editor | Rhetoric | Enthymemic |
| Lestrygonians | The Lunch | 1pm | Oesophagus | - | Constables | Architecture | Peristaltic |
| Scylla and Charybdis | The Library | 2pm | Brain | - | Stratford / London | Literature | Dialectic |
| Wandering Rocks | The Streets | 3pm | Blood | - | Citizens | Mechanics | Labyrinth |
| Sirens | The Concert Room | 4pm | Ear | - | Barmaids | Music | Fuga per canonem^{[a]} |
| Cyclops | The Tavern | 5pm | Muscle | - | Fenian | Politics | Gigantism |
| Nausicaa | The Rocks | 8pm | Eye, nose | Grey / blue | Virgin | Painting | Tumescence / detumescence |
| Oxen of the Sun | The Hospital | 10pm | Womb | White | Mothers | Medicine | Embryonic development |
| Circe | The Brothel | 12am | Locomotor apparatus | - | Whore | Magic | Hallucination |
| Eumaeus | The Shelter | 1am | Nerves | - | Sailors | Navigation | Narrative (old) |
| Ithaca | The House | 2am | Skeleton | - | Comets | Science | Catechism (impersonal) |
| Penelope | The Bed | - | Flesh | - | Earth | - | Monologue (female) |

== See also ==
- Linati schema for Ulysses

== Notes ==
a. Fuga per canonem: Latin for "fugue according to rule", a musical term for a round.
