= David Kidd =

David Kidd may refer to:

- David Campbell Kidd (1889–1954), New Zealand politician
- David Kidd (writer) (1926–1996), American writer interested in China and Japan
- David McLay Kidd, golf course architect
- David Kidd (athlete) in 2004 IAAF World Race Walking Cup
- Dave Kidd (musician) from The Muckrakers
- David Kidd (screenwriter) of The Swinging Cheerleaders
- David Kidd, one of the Scots to be transported from Leith to American plantations aboard the St. Michael of Scarborough, 1678
