= Kid (nickname) =

As a nickname or part of a ring name, Kid may refer to:

== Baseball ==
- Kid Baldwin (1864–1897), American Major League Baseball catcher
- Kid Butler (infielder) (1887–1964), American Major League Baseball infielder
- Kid Butler (outfielder) (1861–1921), American Major League Baseball outfielder
- Kid Carsey (1870–1960), professional baseball player
- Kid Carter, American pitcher in the pre-Negro leagues
- Kid Elberfeld (1875–1944), American Major League Baseball player
- Kid Gleason (1866–1933), American Major League Baseball player and manager
- Kid Madden (1866–1896), American Major League Baseball pitcher
- Kid McLaughlin (1888–1934), American Major League Baseball center fielder
- Kid Mohler (1870–1961), American Major League Baseball player
- Kid Nance (1876–1958), American Major League Baseball outfielder
- Kid Nichols (1869–1953), American Major League Baseball pitcher
- Kid O'Hara (1875–1954), American Major League Baseball outfielder
- Kid Willson (1895–1964), American Major League Baseball player

== Boxing ==
- Kid Azteca, ring name of Mexican boxer Luis Villanueva Paramo (1913–2002)
- Jack Kid Berg, English boxer Judah Bergman (1909–1991)
- Kid Chissell (1905–1987), American boxing champion, actor, and dance marathon champion
- Kid Chocolate, ring name of Cuban boxer Eligio Sardiñas Montalvo (1910–1988)
- Kid Diamond, ring name of Kyrgyzstani boxer Almazbek Raiymkulov (born 1977)
- Kid Galahad (boxer), ring name of British boxer Abdul Bari-Awad (born 1990)
- Kid Kaplan (1901–1970), Russian-born American boxer
- Kid Lavigne (1869–1928), American world champion boxer
- Ted "Kid" Lewis (1894–1970), English boxer Gershon Mendeloff
- Kid McCoy (1872–1940), American world champion boxer born Norman Selby
- Kid Meza (1956—2023), Mexican world champion boxer
- Kid Murphy, early ring name of American boxer Jack Bernstein, born John Dodick (1899–1945)
- Motee "Kid" Singh (1909-1971), Indo-Guyanese boxer
- Jack "Kid" Wolfe (1895–1975), American boxer, first junior featherweight world champion

== Music ==
- Kid Howard (1908–1966), American jazz trumpeter associated with the New Orleans jazz scene
- Kid Ory (1886–1973), American jazz trombonist and bandleader
- Kid Rena (1898–1949), American jazz trumpeter
- Kid Rock (1971-), American rap and country rock singer and songwriter

== Other ==
- Billy the Kid (1859–1881), American outlaw and gunfighter
- Kid Shanahan (1873–1883), American criminal, river pirate, and member of the Patsy Conroy Gang

== See also ==
- Kid (disambiguation)
- Kidd (surname)
