= Christophany =

Appearance or non-physical manifestation of Christ

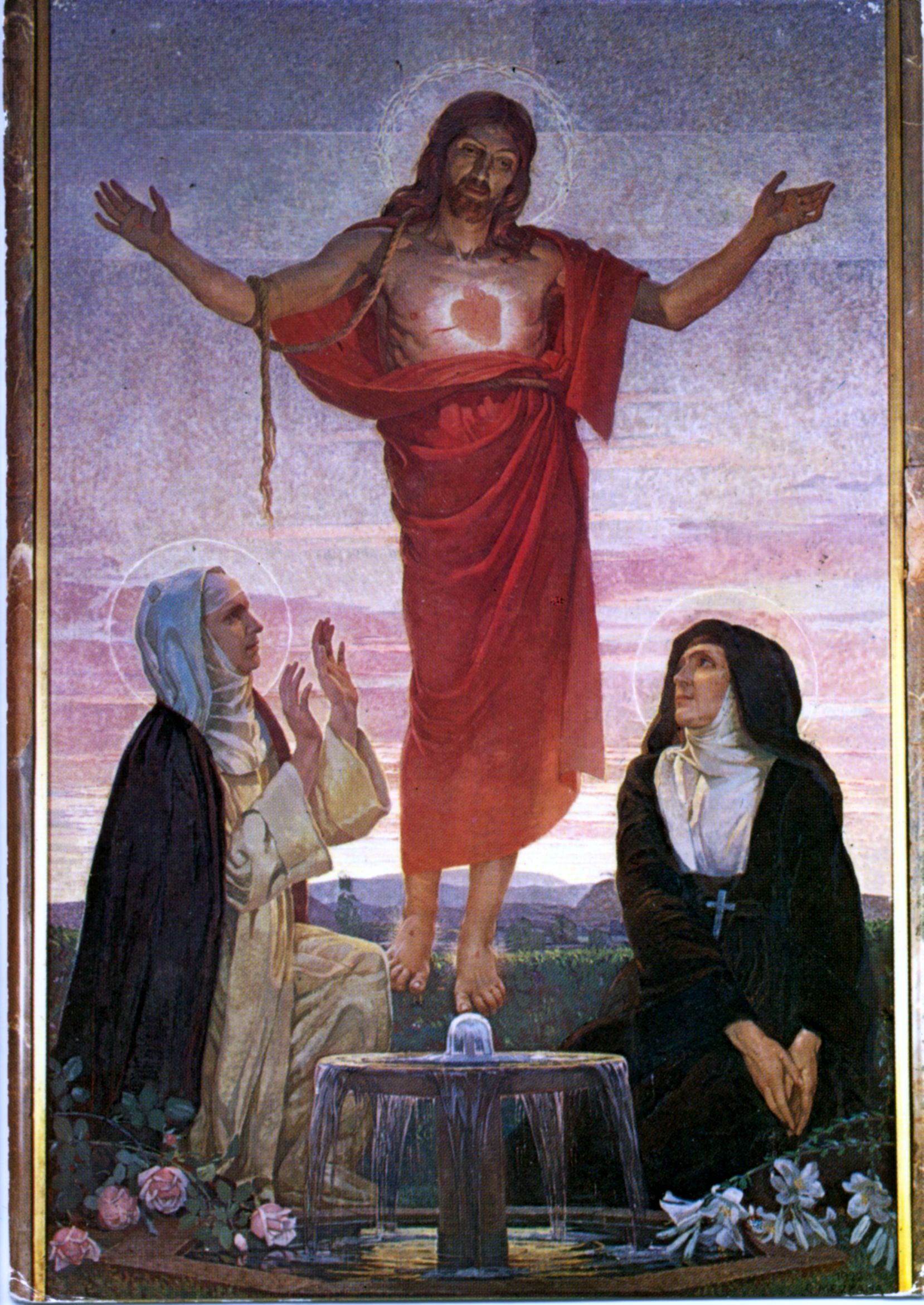
The appearance of Christ and his Sacred Heart to Saint Margaret Mary Alacoque and to Mary of the Divine Heart

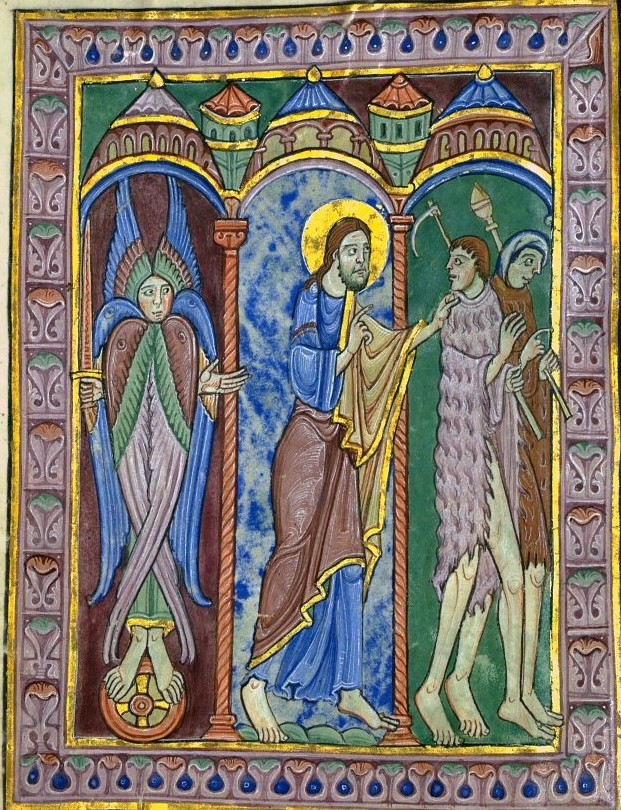
The pre-incarnate Christ expels Adam and Eve from the Garden of Eden. St Albans Psalter.

A Christophany is an appearance or non-physical manifestation of Jesus. Traditionally the term refers to visions of Christ after his ascension, such as the bright light of the conversion of Paul the Apostle.

Also, following the example of Justin Martyr, who identified the Angel of the Lord with the Logos, some appearances of angels in the Old Testament are also identified by some Christians as preincarnate appearances of Christ.

== Etymology ==
The etymology is from Greek Χριστός (Christos) and the ending "-phany", coming from the Greek verb φαίνειν (phainein) "bring to light, cause to appear, show." This noun is derived by direct comparison with the term Theophany (Theophaneia).

== Usage ==
George Balderston Kidd (1852) popularised the term in relation to the identification of angels in the Old Testament as Christ.

The term was used by Albert Joseph Edmunds (1857–1941) in relation to the revealing of Christ in Christianity and Buddhism.

Since the work of James Borland (1978) usage of the term in conservative Christian publications related to Old Testament appearances of Christ has multiplied exponentially.

== Old Testament ==
Certain early Christian writers identified the Angel of the Lord as a pre-incarnate Christ. For example, Justin Martyr claimed that the Angel was the Logos. He writes that "He who is called God and appeared to the patriarchs is called both Angel and Lord ...The word of God, therefore, recorded by Moses, when referring to Jacob the grandson of Abraham, speaks thus" and that "neither Abraham, nor Isaac, nor Jacob, nor any other man saw the Father ... but saw Him who was according to His will His Son, being God, and the Angel because He ministered to His will". Irenaeus also held to this view; he wrote that "when the Son speaks to Moses, He says, 'I have come down to deliver this people'."

A popular Christian understanding of the relationship between Melchizedek and Jesus is that Melchizedek is an Old Testament Christophany. Romanos the Melodist interpreted the figure with whom Abraham spoke in Genesis 18:1–8 as being Christ himself.

J. Douglas MacMillan suggests the angel with whom Jacob wrestles is a "pre-incarnation appearance of Christ in the form of a man." "Once the man touches his hip, he's rendered helpless. If someone wants to destroy the power of a wrestler, you injure his thigh and he is finished. This was narrated in a way to show that you can't get the blessing of God through manipulation. You only get God's blessings when you cling to Him in helpless dependence."

Some church fathers such as Origen and later theologians such as Martin Luther believed another example is the "Man" who appears to Joshua, and identifies himself as "the commander of the army of the LORD." (Joshua 5:13–15). The standard argument that this was in fact Christ is that he accepted Joshua's prostrate worship, whereas angels refuse such worship Bible.org; see Revelation 19:9–10. Additionally, he declared the ground to be holy; elsewhere in the Bible, only things or places set aside for God or claimed by him are called holy; see Exodus 3:5. Jewish commentators reading the same text do not accept that this figure was Christ (or even Adonai), but rather the Archangel Michael.

Jonathan Edwards identified an example in Daniel 3:25, when the fourth man in the furnace is described as “… and the form of the fourth is like the Son of God" or "like a son of the gods.".

The vision of Isaiah (Isaiah 6) may be regarded as a Christophany. It appears to have been seen as such by John the evangelist, who, following a quote from this chapter, adds 'Isaiah said this because he saw His glory and spoke of Him' (John 12:41).

== New Testament ==
The Conversion of Saint Paul, a 1600 painting by the Italian artist Caravaggio

A New Testament Christophany is Paul's vision of Christ on the road to Damascus, and the subsequent one of Ananias. Acts 9 describes how Paul heard a voice from Jesus.

According to the Acts of the Apostles, the martyr Stephen saw a vision of Jesus "standing at the right hand of God" before he was killed.

Another New Testament example is John's vision of the Son of Man, recounted in Revelation 1. In this vision, John sees "... one like the Son of Man" who speak to John, identifying himself as "the first and the last".

== After the New Testament ==
- Saint Jerome is believed to have had a precise vision of the Trinity, as is illustrated by Andrea del Castagno.
- Magdalena de Pazzi was a mystic who claimed several Christophanies about the Trinity.
- Lúcia dos Santos of Fatima claimed to have seen Jesus in the Trinity in Tui in 1926.
- Mary Faustina Kowalska claimed to have had recorded her visions of Jesus.
- Joseph Smith claimed to have seen both Jesus Christ and God the Father in an event known as the First Vision.

== Art ==
In Christian art, God was always given the features of Jesus until about 1400.

== See also ==
- Angel of the Lord
- Divine Mercy (Catholic devotion)
- Pre-existence of Christ
- Theophany
