= Kydd (surname) =

Kydd is a surname. Notable people with the surname include:

- Cynna Kydd, Australian netball player
- Jonathan Kydd (academic), British agricultural expert
- Jonathan Kydd (actor), British actor
- Robbie Kydd, rugby union player
- Sam Kydd, Irish-born British actor

== See also ==
- Frances Shand Kydd, mother of Diana, Princess of Wales
- Peter Shand Kydd, stepfather of Diana, Princess of Wales
