= George Kidd =

George Kidd may refer to:

- George Balderston Kidd (1794–1852), Dissenting Minister and theological writer
- George Nelson Kidd (1864–1907), Ontario farmer and political figure
- George Kidd (footballer) (1909–1988), Scottish footballer
- George Kidd (diplomat) (1917–2004), Canadian ambassador to Israel, and to Cuba
- George Kidd (wrestler) (1925–1998), Scottish professional wrestler
