= Jack Kidd (New Zealand footballer) =

New Zealand footballer

Personal information
- Full name: Jack T Kidd
- Place of birth: New Zealand

Senior career*
| Years | Team | Apps | (Gls) |
- Wanganui Technical Old Boys

International career
| 1948 | New Zealand | 1 | (0) |
- * Club domestic league appearances and goals

Jack Kidd is a former association football player who represented New Zealand at international level.

Kidd made a solitary official international appearance for New Zealand in a 0–6 loss to Australia on 14 August 1948.
