= Thomas Kidd =

Thomas Kidd may refer to:

- Thomas Kidd (British Columbia politician) (1846–1930), politician in British Columbia, Canada
- Thomas Kidd (classical scholar) (1770–1850), English scholar and schoolmaster
- Thomas Kidd (illustrator) (born 1955), American illustrator of science fiction and fantasy books
- Thomas Kidd (Ontario politician) (1889–1973), merchant and politician in Ontario, Canada
- Thomas I. Kidd (1860–1941), Scottish-born American labor union leader
- Thomas S. Kidd (born 1971), American historian

== See also ==
- Tom Kidd (golfer) (c.1848–1884), Scottish golfer
- Tom Kidd (curler) (born 1945), Australian curler
- Thomas Kyd (1558–1594), English dramatist
