= Johnny Kidd =

Johnny Kidd may refer to:

- Johnny Kidd (singer) (1935–1966), vocalist for Johnny Kidd & the Pirates
- Johnny Kidd (wrestler) (born 1955), British professional wrestler

== See also ==
- John Kidd (disambiguation)
