= James Kidd =

James Kidd may refer to:

- James Kidd (politician) (1872–1928), Unionist Party politician in Scotland
- James Kidd (prospector) (1879–1949), American prospector who disappeared in 1949
- James Hutton Kidd (1877–1945), New Zealand horticulturist and community leader
- Jimmy Kidd, English footballer
