= George Balderston Kidd =

Rev. George Balderston Kidd (28 July 1794 in Cottingham, near Hull – 1851, Scarborough) was a Dissenting Minister and theological writer.

== Personal life ==
He was the eldest son of the Rev. Anthony Kidd, Nonconformist minister.

== Career ==
Kidd is mainly remembered for his posthumous book Christophaneia: The Doctrine of the Manifestations of the Son of God under the Economy of the Old Testament (ed. OT Dobbin; London: Ward, 1852). This was used in argument with Unitarians in the 19th century to claim the pre-existence of Christ and the appearance of Christ as the Angel of the Lord and Ancient of Days in the Hebrew Bible. The book was also listed as Christophany: the Result of original Investigations into the Manifestations of the Son of God, under the Old Testament Dispensation. It was one of the first texts to use the term "Christophany" to apply to claimed appearances of Christ as angels in the Hebrew Bible, rather than in the New Testament sense such as the Damascus Christophany.
