= Harry Blamires =

British writer (1916–2017)

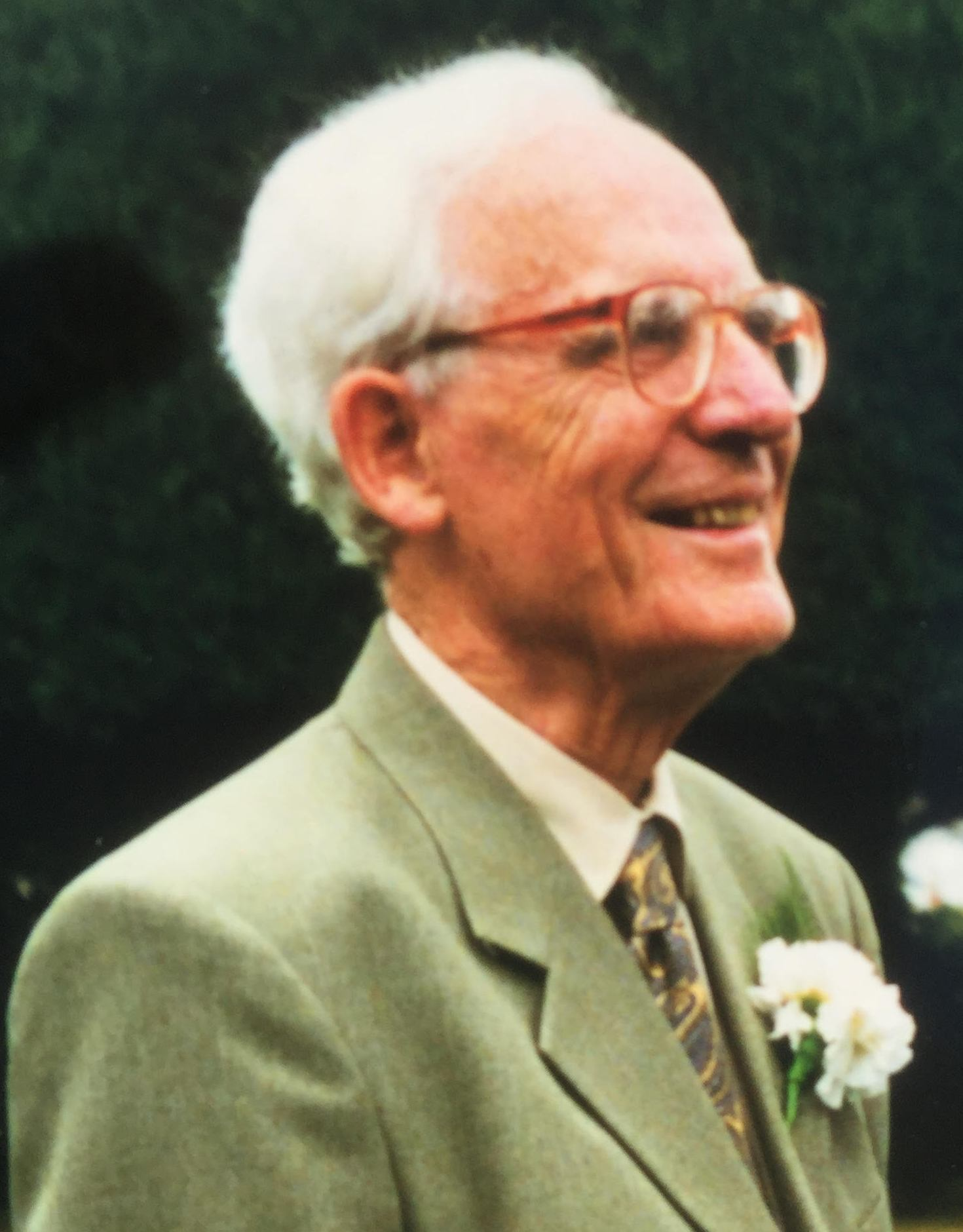
- Harry Blamires 1998
- Born: 6 November 1916; Yorkshire, England
- Died: 21 November 2017 (aged 101)
- Occupations: Anglican theologian, literary critic, and novelist
- Writing career
- Genres: Fantasy, Philosophy

Harry Blamires (6 November 1916 – 21 November 2017) was an English Anglican theologian, literary critic, and novelist. Blamires was once head of the English department at King Alfred's College (now the University of Winchester) in Winchester, England. He started writing in the late 1940s at the encouragement of his friend and mentor C. S. Lewis, who had been his tutor at Oxford University, where he graduated from University College.

== Life and work ==
Blamires married Nancy Bowles in 1940, and they had five sons. He turned 100 in November 2016.

One of their sons is the historian and translator Dr Cyprian Blamires.

His best known works are The Christian Mind: How Should a Christian Think? and The Bloomsday Book. The Bloomsday Book is a guide to James Joyce's Ulysses. It was first published in 1963 and revised in 1988 and 1996 (as The New Bloomsday Book); it continues to help readers of Joyce's best-known work to this day. The Christian Mind has been used as a textbook at hundreds of bible colleges and seminaries around the world. Blamires was also the author of A Short History of English Literature (1974; 2nd edition, 1984), A History of Literary Criticism (1991) and four books on the use of English including The Penguin Guide To Plain English (2000).

Blamires died in November 2017 at the age of 101.

== Works ==
- The Devil's Hunting Grounds (1954, 1st novel of trilogy)
- Cold War in Hell (1955, 2nd novel of trilogy)
- Blessing Unbounded: A Vision (1955, 3rd novel of trilogy)
- Highway to Heaven (1955, 3rd novel of trilogy)
- The Faith and Modern Error (1956) London: S.P.C.K.
- The Kirkbride Conversations: six dialogues of the Christian faith (1958)
- Kirkbride and Company. London: S.P.C.K., 1959 (novel)
- The Offering of Man (1960)
- The Christian Mind (1963) London: S.P.C.K.; New York: Seabury Press. Reprint. Ann Arbor, MI: Servant Books, 1978 ISBN 9780892830497; Vancouver, B.C.: Regent College Publishing, 2005. ISBN 9781573833233
- A Defence of Dogmatism (1965) London: S.P.C.K. American edition, The Tyranny of Time: A Defence of Dogmatism New York: Morehouse-Barlow.
- Where Do We Stand? (1980) London: S.P.C.K.; Ann Arbor, MI: Servant Books ISBN 9780892830787; Reprint. Vancouver, B.C.: Regent College Publishing, 2006. ISBN 9781573833165
- The Post-Christian Mind (1999)
- On Christian Truth (1983) Ann Arbor, MI: Servant Books ISBN 9780892831487 Reprint. Vancouver, B.C.: Regent College Publishing, 2005. ISBN 9781573833127
- The Bloomsday Book: A Guide Through Joyce's Ulysses (1966) ISBN 0-203-13747-7
- Word Unheard (A guide through Eliot's Four Quartets) (1969) London: Methuen; Reprint. London: Routledge, 2015.
- Milton's Creation (A guide through Milton's Paradise Lost) (1971)
- The Will and the Way (A Study of Divine Providence and Vocation) (1957) London: S.P.C.K.
- Recovering the Christian Mind: Meeting the Challenge of Secularism (1988)
- The Queen's English (1995)
- The Penguin Guide To Plain English (2000)
- A Short History Of English Literature (1974, 1984)
- A Guide to Twentieth Century Literature in English (1983)
- A History Of Literary Criticism (1991)
- New Town - A Fable, Unless You Believe (2005)
