= The Muckrakers =

The Muckrakers were a rock band from Louisville, Kentucky formed in 1997. This band has been inactive since 2009, but they released two albums in the 2010s.

== Early days ==
The band started as a duo, with current lead singer-songwriter Rob Carpenter and singer-guitarist John Ruby. The two met at Western Kentucky University (both were history majors). Shortly after meeting the two began playing all over Bowling Green, Kentucky, from dorm rooms to coffee houses. Eventually though, the two began playing at a Bowling Green restaurant, Happy Inn, and began drawing substantial crowds.

== Formation ==
Then the two got Brian Meurer, bassist, and together they recorded their first album, "Forgot To Breathe" (1998). David Kidd, drummer, joined the next year and the band began putting their music on MP3.com, which led to increased popularity and sales. This in turn allowed them to put out their second release in 2001, titled "Losing Sleep".

== Recent developments ==
The Muckrakers continued playing and in 2004 were signed to Toucan Cove Entertainment/Label X. So with their label, the help of producer Todd Smith, and their newly added electric guitarist, Micah Gerdis, the Muckrakers released their first nationally released record, "Front of the Parade." In 2008, they released their follow-up album, The Concorde Fallacy.

On July 17, 2009, The Muckrakers played their final show at Headliner's Music Hall in Louisville. The 23-song setlist was recorded and later released for free.

== Members ==
- Kyler Sane – Guitar/Vocals
- Shanon Munoz – Bass/Vocals
- Jonathan Hoffmann – Drums

== Discography ==
=== Albums ===
- Dirty Water (2016)
- The Album's Off (2018)

=== Videos ===
- Self Loathing
- Doomed
- Halloween Princess & Parasite
