= Ernest Kidd =

English footballer

Personal information
- Date of birth: 25 May 1900
- Place of birth: Dunston, Tyne and Wear, England
- Date of death: 1974 (aged 73–74)
- Height: 5 ft 9 1/2 in (1.77 m)
- Position: Outside right

Senior career*
Years	Team	Apps	(Gls)
1922–1923	Wigan Borough	26	(0)
1923–1924	Ashington	28	(0)
- Workington
- * Club domestic league appearances and goals

Ernest Kidd (25 May 1900 – 1974) was a footballer who played in the Football League for Ashington and Wigan Borough. He was born in Dunston, Tyne and Wear, England.
