= Linati schema for Ulysses =

Schema for the novel Ulysses

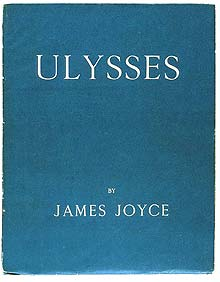
Ulysses cover

This schema, or explanatory outline, for the novel Ulysses was produced by its author, James Joyce, in 1920 in order to help a friend (Carlo Linati) understand the fundamental structure of the book. The schema has been split into two tables for better ease of reading.

Title	Time	Colour	People	Science / Art	Meaning
Telemachus	8 — 9 a.m.	Gold / white	Telemachus; Mentor; Antinous; Suitors; Penelope	Theology	Dispossessed son in contest
Nestor	9 — 10 a.m.	Brown	Telemachus; Nestor; Pisistratus; Helen	History	The wisdom of the ancients
Proteus	10 — 11 a.m.	Green (Note: Blue per Linati. Corrected to green per Don Gifford.)	Telemachus; Proteus; Menelaus; Helen; Megapenthes	Philology	Primal matter
Calypso	8 — 9 a.m.	Orange	Calypso; Penelope; Ulysses; Callidice	Mythology	The departing wayfarer
Lotus Eaters	9 — 10 a.m.	Dark brown	Eurylochus; Polites; Ulysses; Nausicaa	Chemistry	The temptation of faith
Hades	11 a.m. — 12 noon	Black-white	Ulysses; Elpenor; Ajax; Agamemnon; Hercules; Eriphyle; Sisyphus; Orion; Laertes etc.; Prometheus; Cerberus; Tiresias; Hades; Proserpina; Telemachus; Antinous	-	The descent into nothingness
Aeolus	12 noon — 1 p.m.	Red	Aeolus; Sons; Telemachus; Mentor; Ulysses	Rhetoric	The derision of victory
Lestrygonians	1 — 2 p.m.	Blood red	Antiphates; The seductive daughter; Ulysses	Architecture	Despondency
Scylla and Charybdis	2 — 3 p.m.	-	Scylla; Charybdis; Telemachus; Ulysses; Antinous	Literature	The double-edge sword
Wandering Rocks	3 — 4 p.m.	Rainbow	Objects; Places; Forces; Ulysses	Mechanics	The hostile milieu
Sirens	4 — 5 p.m.	Coral	Leucothea; Parthenope; Ulysses; Orpheus; Menelaus; Argonauts	Music	The sweet deceit
Cyclops	5 — 6 p.m.	Green	Prometheus; Noman; Galatea; Ulysses	Surgery	Egocidal terror
Nausicaa	8 — 9 p.m.	Grey	Nausicaa; Handmaidens; Alcinous; Arete; Ulysses	Painting	The projected mirage
Oxen of the Sun	10pm - 11pm	White	Lampetie; Phaethusa; Helios Hyperion; Jove; Ulysses	Physics	The eternal herds
Circe	11 p.m. — 12 midnight	Violet	Circe; The Swine; Telemachus; Ulysses; Hermes	Dance	The man-hating ogress
Eumaeus	12 midnight — 1 a.m.	-	Eumaeus; Ulysses; Telemachus; The Bad Goatherd; Pseudangelos	-	The ambush on home ground
Ithaca	1 — 2 a.m.	-	Ulysses; Telemachus; Eurycleia; The suitors	-	Armed hope
Penelope	$\infty$	-	Ulysses; Laertes; Penelope	-	The past sleeps

Title	Technic	Organ	Symbols
Telemachus	Dialogue for three and four, narration, soliloquy	-	Hamlet, Ireland, Stephen
Nestor	Dialogue for 2, narration, soliloquy	-	Ulster, woman, practical sense
Proteus	Soliloquy	-	World, tide, Moon, evolution, metamorphosis
Calypso	Dialogue for 2, soliloquy	Kidneys	Vagina, exile, nymph, Israel in captivity
Lotus Eaters	Dialogue, prayer, soliloquy	Skin	Host, penis in the bath, froth, flower, drugs, castration, oats
Hades	Dialogue, narration	Heart	Cemetery, sacred heart, the past, the unknown man, the unconscious, heart defect, relics, heartbreak
Aeolus	Simbouleutike, dikanike, epideictic, tropes	Lungs	Machines, wind, fame, kite, failed destinies, the press, mutability
Lestrygonians	Peristaltic prose	Oesophagus	Bloody sacrifice, food, shame
Scylla and Charybdis	Whirlpools	Brain	Hamlet, Shakespeare, Christ, Socrates, London, Stratford, scholasticism, mysticism, Plato, Aristotle, youth, maturity
Wandering Rocks	Shifting labyrinth between two shores	Blood	Caesar, Christ, errors, homonyms, synchronisms, resemblances
Sirens	Fuga per canonem (Note: Fuga per canonem: Latin for "fugue according to rule", a musical term for a round.)	Ear	Promises, female, sounds, embellishments
Cyclops	Alternating asymmetry	Muscles, bones	Nation, state, religion, dynasty, idealism, exaggeration, fanaticism, collectivity
Nausicaa	Retrogressive progression	Eye, nose	Onanism, feminine, hypocrisy
Oxen of the Sun	Prose, embryo, foetus, birth	Matrix, uterus	Fertilisation, frauds, parthenogenesis
Circe	Exploding vision	Locomotor apparatus, skeleton	Zoology, personification, pantheism, magic, poison, antidote, reel
Eumaeus	Relaxed prose	Nerves	-
Ithaca	Dialogue, pacified style, fusion	Juices	-
Penelope	Monologue, resigned style	Fat	-

== See also ==
- Gilbert schema for Ulysses
