= John Kidd (footballer) =

English footballer

Personal information
- Full name: John Oliver Kidd
- Date of birth: 15 January 1936 (age 90)
- Place of birth: Birkenhead, England
- Position: Forward

Senior career*
Years	Team	Apps	(Gls)
1955–1959	Tranmere Rovers	34	(4)
- * Club domestic league appearances and goals

John Oliver Kidd (born 15 January 1936) is an English former footballer, who played as a forward in the Football League for Tranmere Rovers.
