= John Kidd (scholar) =

John Kidd is an American literary scholar, specializing in James Joyce studies. He was a central figure in the "Joyce Wars", prompting controversy with his criticism of Hans Walter Gabler's 1984 edition of Ulysses in 1988. He was the director of Boston University's James Joyce Research Center. Thought dead for over a decade, Kidd was found alive and still studying literature in Rio de Janeiro in 2018 by journalist Jack Hitt.
