= Jonathan Kydd (academic) =

British academic

Professor Jonathan Kydd (born 1951 in Hemel Hempstead) is a leading expert in Agricultural Development Economics, has examined the demand and supply constraints affecting poor farmers in sub-Saharan Africa, and has argued for dramatic policy reform and increased attention to governance issues in the region. Professor Kydd garnered notoriety for his analysis of the 2001/2002 food crisis in Malawi, Malawi's redeployment of labour in the 1970s, and his analysis of Zambia's transition to coffee crops.

Professor Kydd is currently Dean of the University of London International Programmes (which has a current enrolment of over 50,000 students) and Visiting Professor at the Imperial College London. Prior to his appointment at the University of London, Professor Kydd was Director of the Distance Learning Programme, Centre for Environmental Policy at Imperial College London, which focuses on international development and poverty reduction, sustainability, environment, biodiversity, economics and agribusiness. While in the latter role, Professor Kydd was instrumental in helping to create the MSc in Applied Environmental Economics, a programme which now boasts over 1000 students and over 40 courses.

Professor Kydd has extensive experience in Africa (he was Senior Lecturer in Economics at the University of Malawi in the early 1980s) and the natural resources sector, together with a particular interest in the role of the private sector in development. His subject expertise is in agricultural policy analysis (especially links between the agricultural sector and the macro economy); economic liberalisation and structural adjustment; the role of the agricultural sector in the transition from central planning to the market; rural development and finance; food security and agricultural projects.

Professor Kydd is a non-executive director of CDC Plc, a leading private equity investor in emerging markets.
