= James Joyce =

Irish novelist and poet (1882–1941)

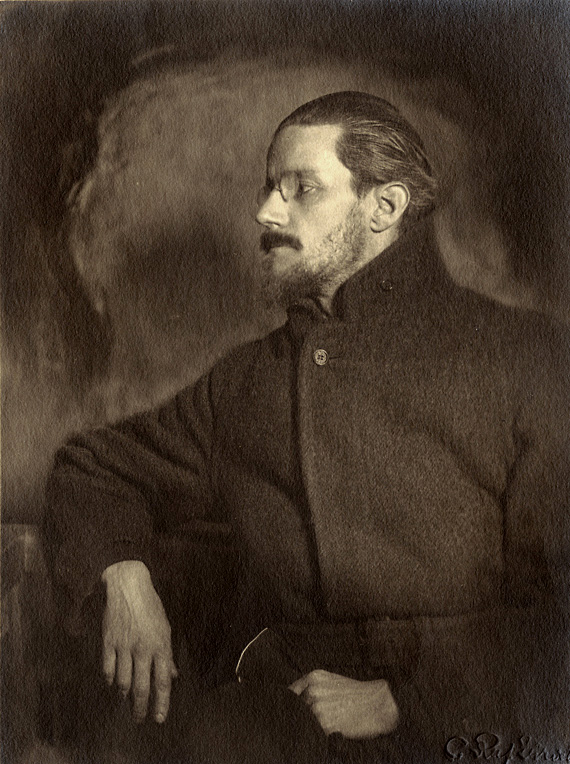
- Joyce c. 1918
- Born: 2 February 1882; Dublin, Ireland
- Died: 13 January 1941 (aged 58); Zurich, Switzerland
- Spouse: Nora Barnacle
- Children: 2, including Lucia
- Writing career
- Notable works: Dubliners (1914); A Portrait of the Artist as a Young Man (1916); Ulysses (1922); Finnegans Wake (1939)

James Augustine Aloysius Joyce (born James Augusta Joyce; (Note: Joyce was named after his paternal grandfather, but his middle name was mistakenly registered as Augusta at the time of his birth. Joyce acquired his saint's name Aloysius at his confirmation in 1891.) 2 February 1882 – 13 January 1941) was an Irish novelist, poet, and literary critic. He contributed to the modernist movement and is regarded among the most influential and important writers of the 20th century. Joyce's novel Ulysses (1922) is a landmark in which the episodes of Homer's Odyssey are paralleled in a variety of literary styles, particularly stream of consciousness. His other well-known works include the short-story collection Dubliners (1914) and the novels A Portrait of the Artist as a Young Man (1916) and Finnegans Wake (1939). His other writings include two books of poetry, a play, correspondence, and occasional journalism.

Born in Dublin into a middle-class family, Joyce attended the Jesuit Clongowes Wood College in County Kildare, then, briefly, the Christian Brothers–run O'Connell School. Despite the chaotic family life imposed by his father's unpredictable finances, he excelled at the Jesuit Belvedere College and graduated from University College Dublin in 1902. In 1904, he met his future wife, Nora Barnacle, and they moved to mainland Europe. He briefly worked in Pola (now in Croatia) and then moved to Trieste in Austria-Hungary, working as an English instructor. Except for an eight-month stay in Rome working as a correspondence clerk and three visits to Dublin, Joyce lived there until 1915. In Trieste, he published his book of poems Chamber Music and his short-story collection Dubliners, and began serially publishing A Portrait of the Artist as a Young Man in the English magazine The Egoist. During most of World War I, Joyce lived in Zurich, Switzerland, and worked on Ulysses. After the war, he briefly returned to Trieste and in 1920 moved to Paris, which was his primary residence until 1940.

Ulysses was first published in Paris in 1922, but its publication in the United Kingdom and the United States was prohibited owing to its perceived obscenity. Copies were smuggled into both countries and pirated versions were printed until the mid-1930s, when publication became legal. Ulysses frequently ranks high in lists of the greatest books, and academic literature analysing Joyce's work is extensive and ongoing. Many writers, film-makers, and other artists have been influenced by his stylistic innovations, such as his meticulous attention to detail, use of interior monologue, wordplay, and the radical transformation of traditional plot and character development.

Though most of his adult life was spent abroad, his fictional universe centres on Dublin and is largely populated by characters who closely resemble family members, enemies and friends from his time there. Ulysses is set in the city's streets and alleyways. Joyce is quoted as saying: "For myself, I always write about Dublin, because if I can get to the heart of Dublin I can get to the heart of all the cities of the world. In the particular is contained the universal."

In 1923, Joyce started his next major work, Finnegans Wake. It was published in 1939. Between these years, he travelled widely. He and Nora were married in a civil ceremony in London in 1931. He made several trips to Switzerland, frequently seeking treatment for his increasingly severe eye problems and psychological help for his daughter, Lucia. When Germany occupied France during World War II, Joyce moved back to Zurich in 1940. He died there in 1941 after surgery for a perforated ulcer at age 58.

== Early life ==
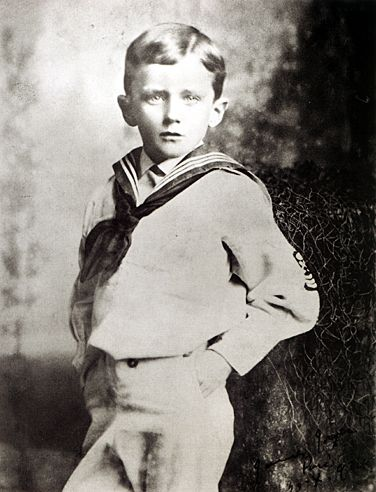
Joyce aged six (1888)

Joyce was born on 2 February 1882 at 41 Brighton Square, Rathgar, Dublin, Ireland, to John Stanislaus and Mary Jane "May" (née Murray) Joyce. He was the eldest of ten surviving siblings. He was baptised Catholic as James Augustine Joyce (Note: Joyce was named after his paternal grandfather, but his middle name was mistakenly registered as Augusta at the time of his birth.) in the nearby St Joseph's Church in Terenure on 5 February 1882 by Father John O'Mulloy. (Note: Joyce acquired his saint's name Aloysius at his confirmation in 1891.) His godparents were Philip and Ellen McCann. The Joyce family came from Fermoy in County Cork, where they owned a small salt and lime works. Joyce's paternal grandfather, James Augustine, married Ellen O'Connell, daughter of John O'Connell, a Cork alderman who owned a drapery business and other properties in Cork City. Her family claimed kinship with the political leader Daniel O'Connell, who had helped secure Catholic emancipation for the Irish in 1829.

John Joyce was appointed rate collector by Dublin Corporation in 1887. The family moved to the fashionable small town of Bray, 19 kilometres (12 mi) from Dublin. Joyce was attacked by a dog around this time, causing a lifelong fear of dogs. (Note: Joyce's fear of dogs may have been exaggerated.) He later developed a astraphobia from a superstitious aunt who had called thunderstorms a sign of God's wrath. (Note: According to Irish artist Arthur Power, Joyce, who sometimes took his children and Power on a ride, once ordered the driver to turn home when a storm broke out. When Power asked "Why are you so afraid of thunder? Your children don't mind it." Joyce answered "Ah, they have no religion".)

In 1891, the nine-year-old Joyce wrote "Et Tu, Healy", a poem on the death of Charles Stewart Parnell that his father printed on broadsides and distributed to friends. It expressed the sentiments of the elder Joyce, who was angry at Parnell's apparent betrayal by the Irish Catholic Church, the Irish Parliamentary Party, and the British Liberal Party that resulted in a collaborative failure to secure Irish Home Rule in the British Parliament. This sense of betrayal, particularly by the Church, left lasting impressions that Joyce expressed in his life and art.

That year, his family began to slide into poverty, worsened by his father's drinking and financial mismanagement. John Joyce's name was published in Stubbs' Gazette, a blacklist of debtors and bankrupts, in November 1891, and he was temporarily suspended from work. In January 1893, he was dismissed with a reduced pension.

Joyce began his education in 1888 at Clongowes Wood College, a Jesuit boarding school near Clane, County Kildare, but had to leave in 1891 when his father could no longer pay the fees. He studied at home and briefly attended the Christian Brothers O'Connell School on North Richmond Street, Dublin. Joyce's father then had a chance meeting with the Jesuit priest John Conmee, who knew the family. Conmee arranged for Joyce and his brother Stanislaus to attend the Jesuits' Dublin school, Belvedere College, without fees starting in 1893. In 1895, Joyce, now 13, was elected by his peers to join the Sodality of Our Lady. Joyce spent five years at Belvedere, his intellectual formation guided by the principles of Jesuit education laid down in the Ratio Studiorum (Plan of Studies). He won first place for English composition in his final two years before graduating in 1898.

== University years ==
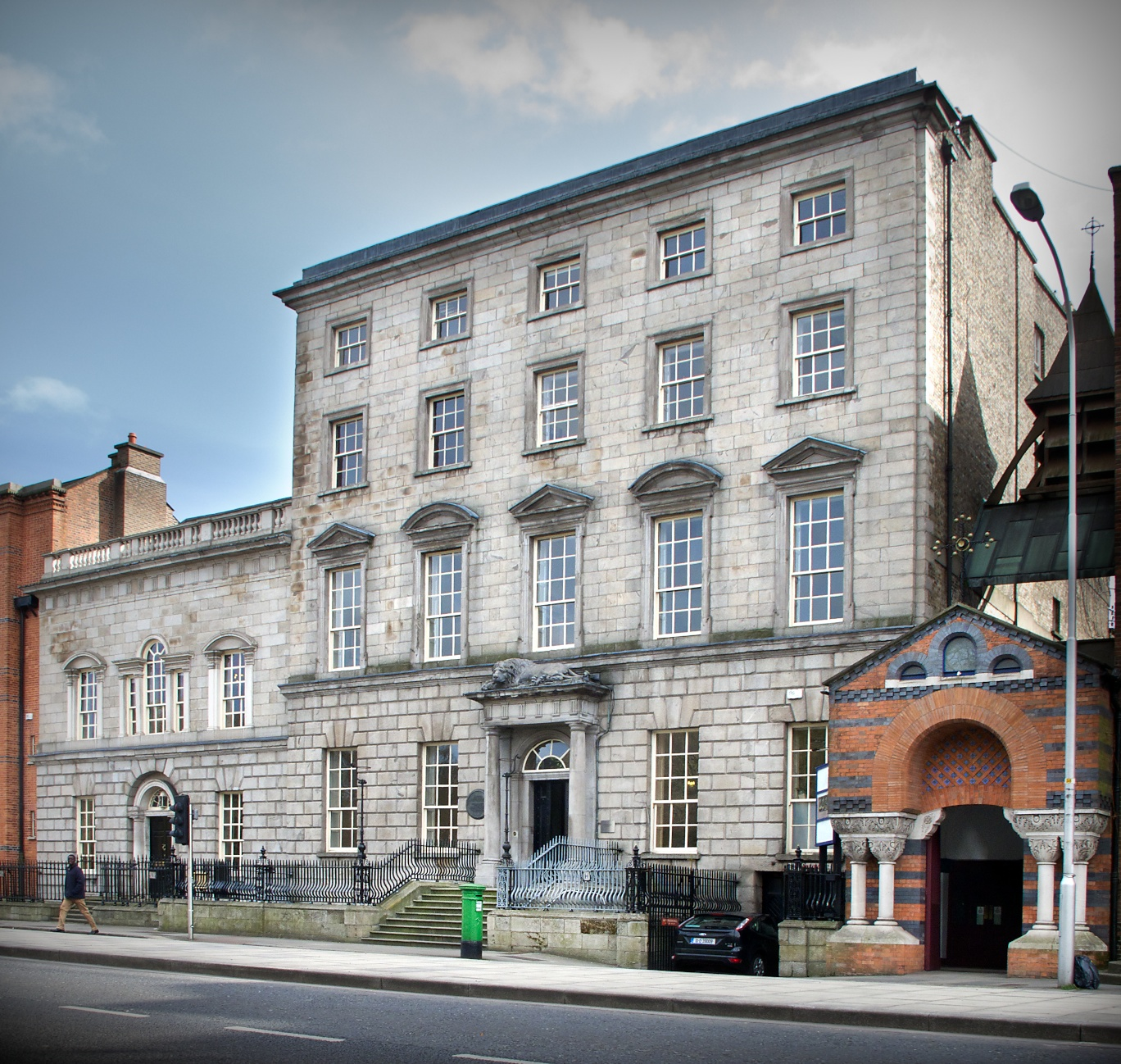
Newman House, Dublin, which was University College in Joyce's time

Joyce enrolled at University College (Note: University College was part of the Royal University of Ireland. It became University College Dublin, one of three colleges in the new National University of Ireland, in 1908. The others were University College Galway and University College Cork.) in 1898 to study English, French and Italian. While there, he was exposed to the scholasticism of Thomas Aquinas, which had a strong influence on his thought for the rest of his life. He participated in many of Dublin's theatrical and literary circles. His closest colleagues included leading Irish figures of his generation, such as George Clancy, Tom Kettle and Francis Sheehy-Skeffington. Many of the acquaintances he made at this time appeared in his work. His first publication—a laudatory review of Henrik Ibsen's When We Dead Awaken—was printed in The Fortnightly Review in 1900. Inspired by Ibsen's works, Joyce sent him a fan letter in Norwegian (Note: Ibsen did not reply to the fan letter, but he had previously asked the Scottish critic William Archer to thank Joyce for his "very benevolent" review.) and wrote a play, A Brilliant Career, which he later destroyed. (Note: Joyce's dedicatory page to the play is all that is left: "To My own Soul I dedicate the first true work of my life.")

In 1901 the National Census of Ireland listed Joyce as a 19-year-old unmarried Irish- and English-speaking student living with his parents, six sisters and three brothers at Royal Terrace (now Inverness Road) in Clontarf, Dublin. During this year he became friends with Oliver St. John Gogarty, the model for Buck Mulligan in Ulysses. In November, Joyce wrote an article, The Day of the Rabblement, criticising the Irish Literary Theatre for its unwillingness to produce the works of playwrights like Ibsen, Leo Tolstoy, and Gerhart Hauptmann. He protested against nostalgic Irish populism and argued for an outward-looking, cosmopolitan literature. Because he mentioned Gabriele D'Annunzio's novel Il fuoco (The Flame), which was on the Catholic list of prohibited books, his college magazine, St. Stephen's, refused to print it. Joyce and Sheehy-Skeffington—who had also had an article rejected—had their essays jointly printed and distributed. Arthur Griffith decried the censorship of Joyce's work in his newspaper United Irishman.

Joyce graduated from the Royal University of Ireland in October 1902. He considered studying medicine and began attending lectures at the Catholic University Medical School in Dublin. When the school refused to provide a tutoring position to help finance his education, he left Dublin to study medicine in Paris, where he received permission to attend the course for a certificate in physics, chemistry, and biology at the École de Médecine. By the end of January 1903 he had given up plans to study medicine, but he stayed in Paris, often reading late in the Bibliothèque Sainte-Geneviève. He frequently wrote home claiming ill health due to the water, the cold weather, and his change of diet, appealing for money his family could ill afford.

== Post-university years in Dublin ==
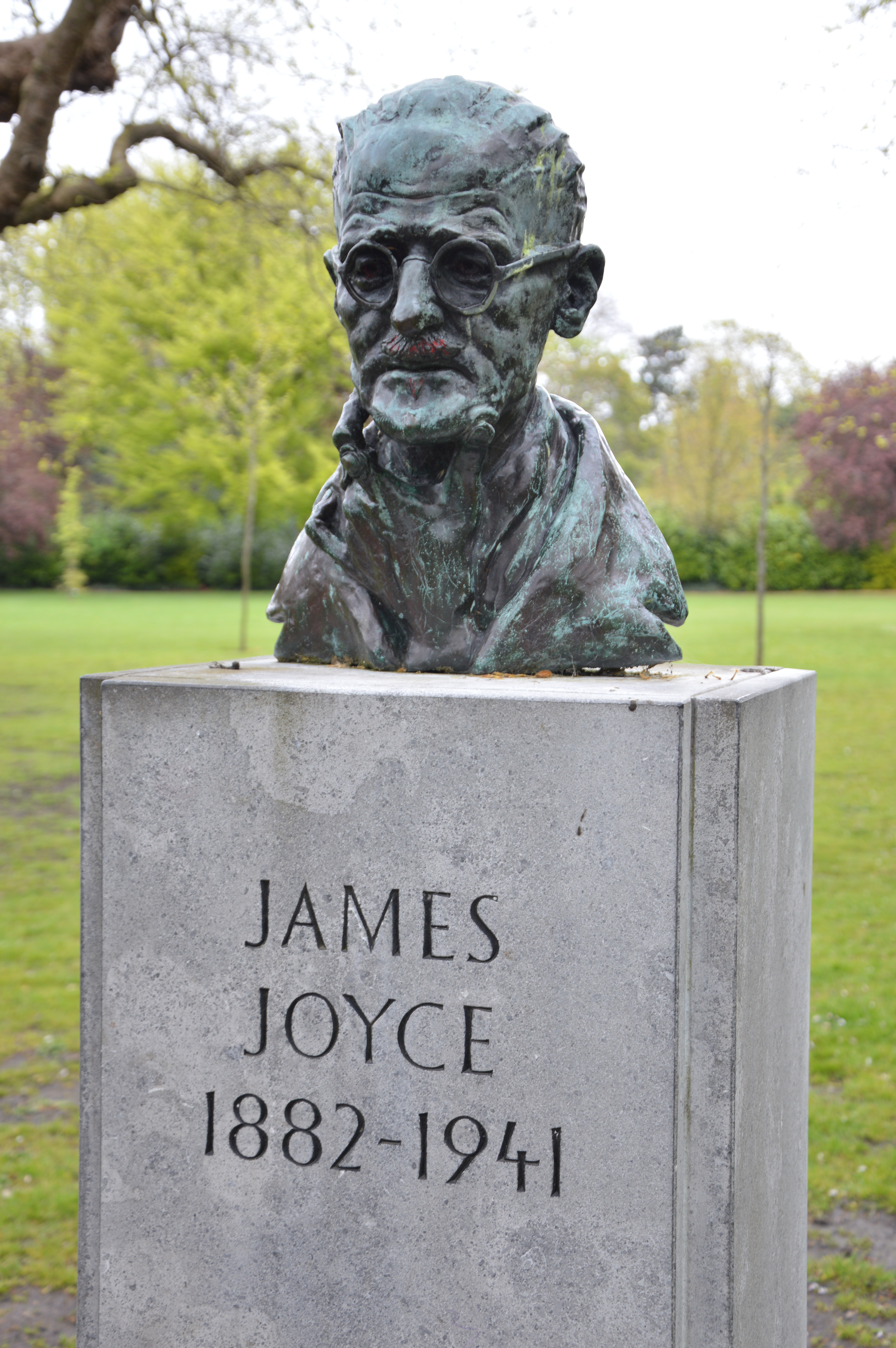
Bust of Joyce on St Stephen's Green, Dublin, by Marjorie Fitzgibbon

In April 1903, Joyce learned his mother was dying (Note: Joyce's mother was initially diagnosed with cirrhosis of the liver; Ellmann says that it became apparent she was actually dying of cancer. This may reflect what Joyce's family came to believe, but Gorman's 1939 biography of Joyce, which was edited by Joyce, states that she died of cirrhosis, as does her death certificate.) and immediately returned to Ireland. He tended to her, reading aloud from drafts that were eventually worked into his unfinished novel Stephen Hero. During her final days, she unsuccessfully tried to get him to make his confession and to take communion. (Note: Gorman writes: "Mary Jane Joyce was dying in the sanctity of the bosom of her Church ... and her eldest son could only grieve that the two wills could not meet and mix. He was incapable of bending his knee to the powerful phantom, that once acknowledged, would devour him as it had devoured so many about him and half a civilisation as well.") She died on 13 August. Afterwards, Joyce and Stanislaus refused to kneel with other members of the family praying at her bedside. John Joyce's drinking and abusiveness increased in the months following her death, and the family began to fall apart. Joyce spent much of his time carousing with Gogarty and his medical school colleagues, and tried to scrape together a living by reviewing books for the Dublin Daily Express.

Joyce's life began to change when he met Nora Barnacle on 10 June 1904. She was a 20-year-old woman from Galway city who was working in Dublin as a chambermaid. They had their first outing together on 16 June 1904, (Note: Though there is substantial circumstantial evidence supporting that date, there is no direct documentary evidence confirming that Joyce and Nora's walk on the Ringsend actually occurred on this day.) walking through the Dublin suburb of Ringsend, where Nora masturbated him. This event was commemorated as the date for the action of Ulysses, known in popular culture as "Bloomsday" in honour of the novel's main character Leopold Bloom. This began a relationship that continued for 37 years, until Joyce died. Soon after this outing, Joyce, who had been out with his colleagues, approached a young woman in St Stephen's Green and was beaten up by her companion. He was picked up and dusted off by an acquaintance of his father's, Alfred H. Hunter, who took him into his home to tend to his injuries. Hunter, who was rumoured to be a Jew and to have an unfaithful wife, became one of the models for Leopold Bloom, the protagonist of Ulysses.

Joyce was a talented tenor and explored becoming a musical performer. (Note: Composer Otto Luening, who knew Joyce in Trieste, described his voice as being "mellow and pleasant ... a nice Irish-Italian tenor ... very good for Italian operas of the 17th and 18th centuries".) On 8 May 1904, he was a contestant in the Feis Ceoil, an Irish music competition for promising composers, instrumentalists and singers. In the months before the contest, Joyce took singing lessons with two voice instructors, Benedetto Palmieri and Vincent O'Brien. He paid the entry fee by pawning some of his books. For the contest, Joyce had to sing three songs. He did well with the first two, but when he was told he had to sight read the third, he refused. Joyce won the third-place medal anyway. (Note: The details of what happened immediately after the contest are unclear. For example, Oliver Gogarty claims Joyce threw his medal into the Liffey, but Joyce apparently gave the medal to his Aunt Josephine, and it ended up being bought by the choreographer Michael Flatley at an auction in 2004.) After the contest, Palmieri wrote to Joyce that Luigi Denza, the composer of the popular song "Funiculì, Funiculà" who was the judge for the contest, spoke highly of his voice and would have given him first place but for the sight-reading and lack of sufficient training. Palmieri offered to give Joyce free singing lessons. Joyce refused the lessons, but kept singing in Dublin concerts that year. His performance at a concert given on 27 August may have solidified Nora's devotion to him. Although Joyce did not pursue a singing career, he included thousands of musical allusions in his literary works.

Throughout 1904, Joyce sought to develop his literary reputation. On 7 January he attempted to publish a prose work examining aesthetics called A Portrait of the Artist, but it was rejected by the intellectual journal Dana. He then reworked it into a fictional novel of his youth, Stephen Hero, that he laboured over for years but eventually abandoned. (Note: Stephen Hero was published after Joyce's death in 1944.) He wrote a satirical poem, "The Holy Office", that parodied W. B. Yeats's poem "To Ireland in the Coming Times" (Note: Though Joyce parodied Yeats in "Holy Office", he admired two short stories Yeats had written, "Tables of the Law" and "Adoration of the Magi". The former he memorised by heart and references to both were integrated into Joyce's "Stephen Hero". Joyce admired Yeats's 1899 play The Countess Cathleen as well, which he translated into Italian in 1911.) and once more mocked the Irish Literary Revival. It too was rejected for publication, this time for being "unholy". He wrote the collection of poems Chamber Music at this time; which was also rejected. (Note: The title Chamber Music had been suggested by Stanislaus, but Joyce accepted it as a double entendre, implying both the sound of chamber music and the sound of urine falling in a chamber pot.) He did publish three poems, one in Dana and two in The Speaker, and George William Russell (Note: According to Stanislaus, Russell and Joyce became acquainted through a common interest in theosophy, which he briefly explored after his mother's death. Joyce's knowledge of theosophy appears in his later writing, particularly Finnegans Wake.) published three of Joyce's short stories in the Irish Homestead. These stories—"The Sisters", "Eveline", and "After the Race"—were the beginnings of Dubliners.

In September 1904, Joyce was having difficulties finding a place to live and moved into a Martello tower near Dublin, which Gogarty was renting. Within a week, Joyce left when Gogarty and another housemate, Dermot Chenevix Trench, fired a pistol in the middle of the night at some pans hanging directly over Joyce's bed. With the help of funds from Lady Gregory and a few other acquaintances, Joyce and Nora left Ireland less than a month later.

== 1904–1906: Zurich, Pola and Trieste ==
=== Zurich and Pola ===
In October 1904, Joyce and Nora went into self-imposed exile. They briefly stopped in London and Paris to secure funds before heading on to Zurich. Joyce had been informed through an agent in England that there was a vacancy at the Berlitz Language School, but when he arrived there was no position. The couple stayed in Zurich for a little over a week. The director of the school sent Joyce on to Trieste, which was part of the Austro-Hungarian Empire until the First World War. (Note: Trieste is now in Italy.) There was no vacancy there either. (Note: After less than an hour in Trieste, Joyce found himself arrested and jailed when he got into the middle of an altercation between three sailors of the Royal Navy and Austro-Hungarian police. He had to be released by the British Vice-Consul.) The director of the school in Trieste, Almidano Artifoni, secured a position for him in Pola, then Austria-Hungary's major naval base, (Note: It is now called Pula and is in Croatia.) where he mainly taught English to naval officers. Less than one month after the couple had left Ireland, Nora had become pregnant. Joyce soon became close friends with Alessandro Francini Bruni, the director of the school at Pola, and his wife Clothilde. By the beginning of 1905, the two families were living together. Joyce kept writing when he could. He completed a short story for Dubliners, "Clay", and worked on his novel Stephen Hero. He disliked Pola, calling it a "back-of-God-speed place—a naval Siberia", and as soon as a job became available, he went to Trieste. (Note: It was later rumoured that Joyce had been evicted from Pola when the Austrians—having discovered an espionage ring in the city—expelled all aliens, but the evidence suggests that he moved because the position in Trieste was better.)

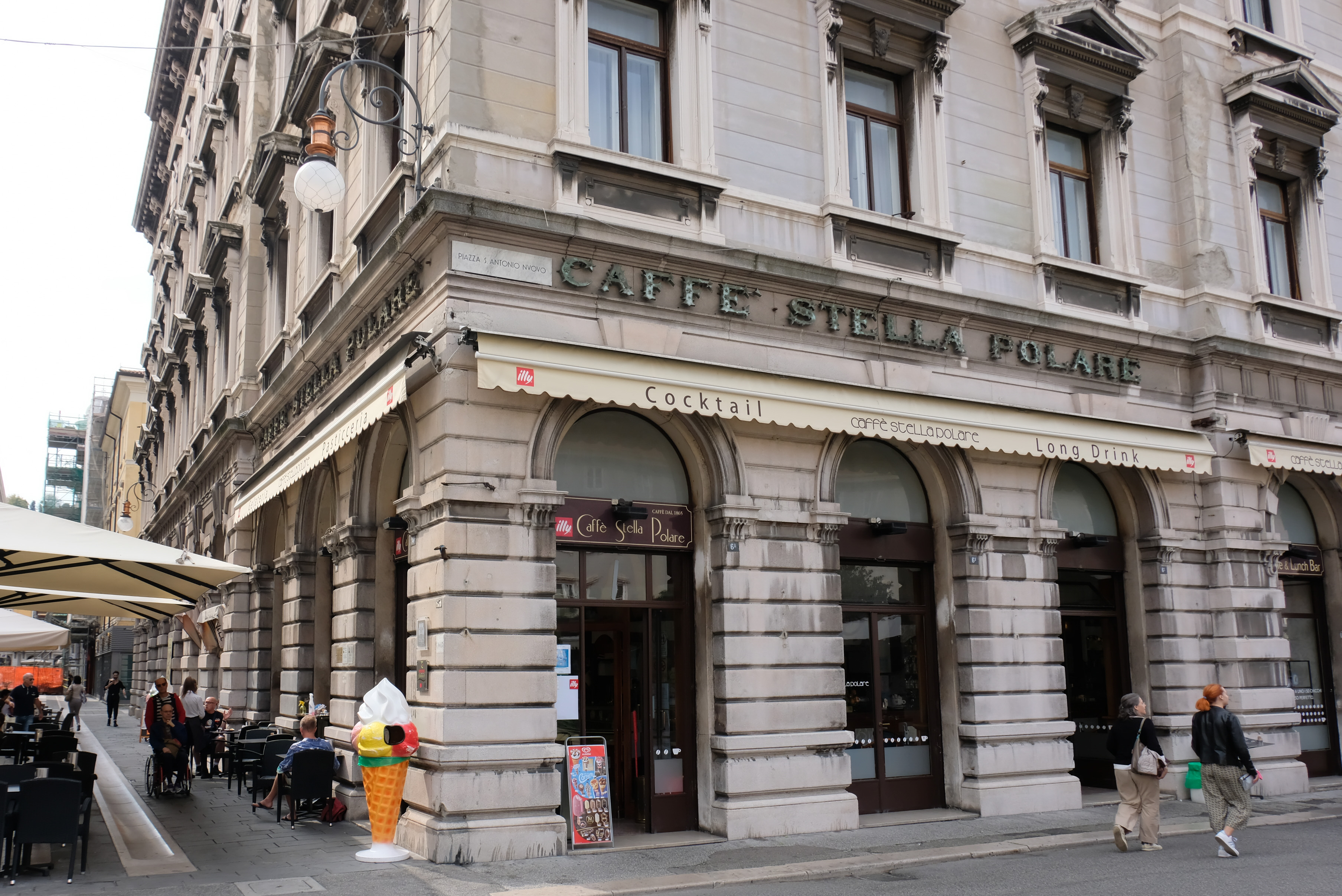
The Caffè Stella Polare in Trieste, often visited by Joyce

=== First stay in Trieste ===
Joyce moved to Trieste in March 1905 aged 23. He taught English at the Berlitz school. That June he published the satirical poem "The Holy Office".

After Nora gave birth to their first child, Giorgio, (Note: Joyce's son was named Giorgio when he was born, but later preferred to be called George.) on 27 July 1905, he convinced Stanislaus to move to Trieste and obtained a position for him at the Berlitz school. Stanislaus moved in with Joyce as soon as he arrived that October, although most of his salary went directly to supporting Joyce's family. In February 1906, the Joyce household once more shared an apartment with the Francini Brunis.

During this period Joyce completed 24 chapters of Stephen Hero and all but the final story of Dubliners, but was unable to get Dubliners published. Although the London publisher Grant Richards had a contract with Joyce, the printers were unwilling to print passages they found controversial; English law could not protect them if brought to court for circulating indecent language. Richards and Joyce tried to find a solution where the book could avoid legal liability while preserving Joyce's artistic integrity. As they negotiated, Richards began to scrutinise the stories more carefully. He became concerned that the book might damage his publishing house's reputation and eventually backed down from his agreement.

Trieste was Joyce's main residence until 1920; he stayed temporarily in Rome, travelled to Dublin, and emigrated to Zurich during World War I, but Trieste became a second Dublin for him and played an important role in his development as a writer. (Note: Joyce's Triestine colleague, the writer Italo Svevo states that with the exception of some stories of Dubliners and the "songs" of Chamber Music, "All his other works down to Ulysses were born in Trieste".) He completed Dubliners, reworked Stephen Hero into A Portrait of the Artist as a Young Man, wrote his only published play Exiles and decided to make Ulysses a full-length novel as he worked through his notes and jottings, working out the characters of Leopold and Molly Bloom in Trieste. Many of the novel's details were taken from Joyce's observation of the city and its people, and some of its stylistic innovations appear to have been influenced by Futurism. (Note: Regarding the role of Trieste on the creation of Ulysses, Svevo states "To the Irish critic [Earnest] Boyd, who asserted that Ulysses was merely the product of pre-war thought in Ireland, Valery Larbaud replied 'Yes, in so far as it came to maturity in Trieste'.") There are even words of the Triestine dialect in Finnegans Wake. Joyce was introduced to the Greek Orthodox liturgy in Trieste. Under its influence, he rewrote his first short story and later drew on it in creating the liturgical parodies in Ulysses and irreverent allusions in Finnegans Wake.

== 1906–1915: Rome, Trieste, and sojourns to Dublin ==
=== Rome ===
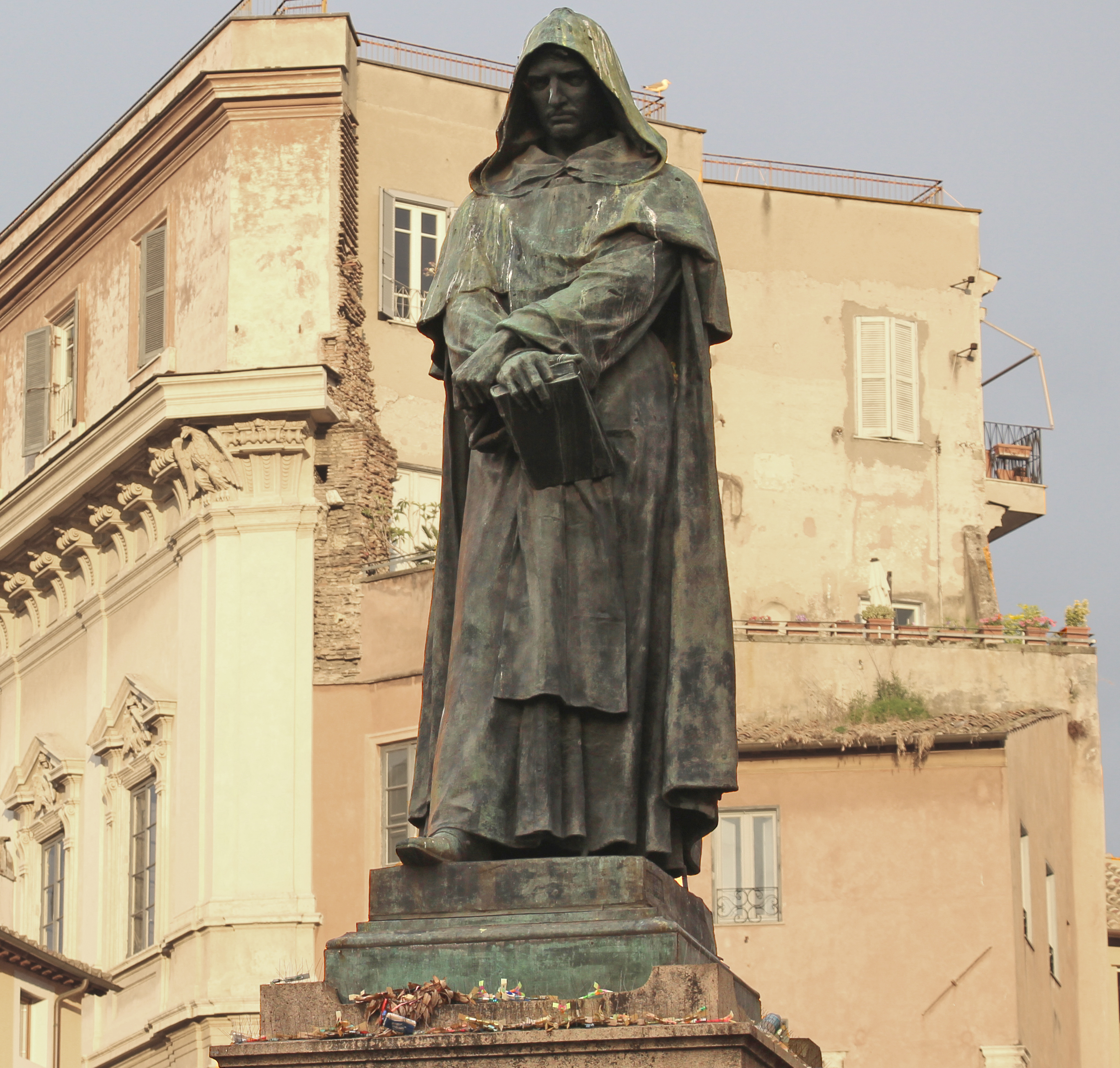
Monument to Giordano Bruno at the Campo de' Fiori by Ettore Ferrari. Joyce admired Bruno and attended the procession in his honour while in Rome.

In late May 1906, the head of the Berlitz school ran away after embezzling its funds. Artifoni took over the school but let Joyce know that he could afford to keep only one brother on. Tired of Trieste and discouraged that he could not get a publisher for Dubliners, Joyce found an advertisement for a correspondence clerk in a Roman bank that paid twice his current salary. He was hired for the position and went to Rome at the end of July.

Joyce felt he accomplished very little during his brief stay in Rome, but it had a large impact on his writing. Though his new job took up most of his time, he revised Dubliners and worked on Stephen Hero. Rome was the birthplace of the idea for "The Dead", which became the final story of Dubliners, and for Ulysses, which was originally conceived as a short story. (Note: In October, Joyce wrote "I have a new story for Dubliners in my head. It deals with Mr. [Alfred] Hunter", the man who was picked him after he was beaten in 1904. In November, he first mentioned the title of the story as "Ulysses", and in Feb 1907, he mentioned "Ulysses" along with "The Dead" and three other stories that never appeared.) His stay in the city was one of his inspirations for Exiles. While there, he read the socialist historian Guglielmo Ferrero in depth. Ferrero's anti-heroic interpretations of history, arguments against militarism, and conflicted attitudes toward Jews found their way into Ulysses, particularly in the character of Leopold Bloom. In London, Elkin Mathews published Chamber Music on the recommendation of the British poet Arthur Symons. Nonetheless, Joyce was dissatisfied with his job, had exhausted his finances, and realised he would need additional support when he learned Nora was pregnant again. He left Rome after seven months.

=== Second stay in Trieste ===
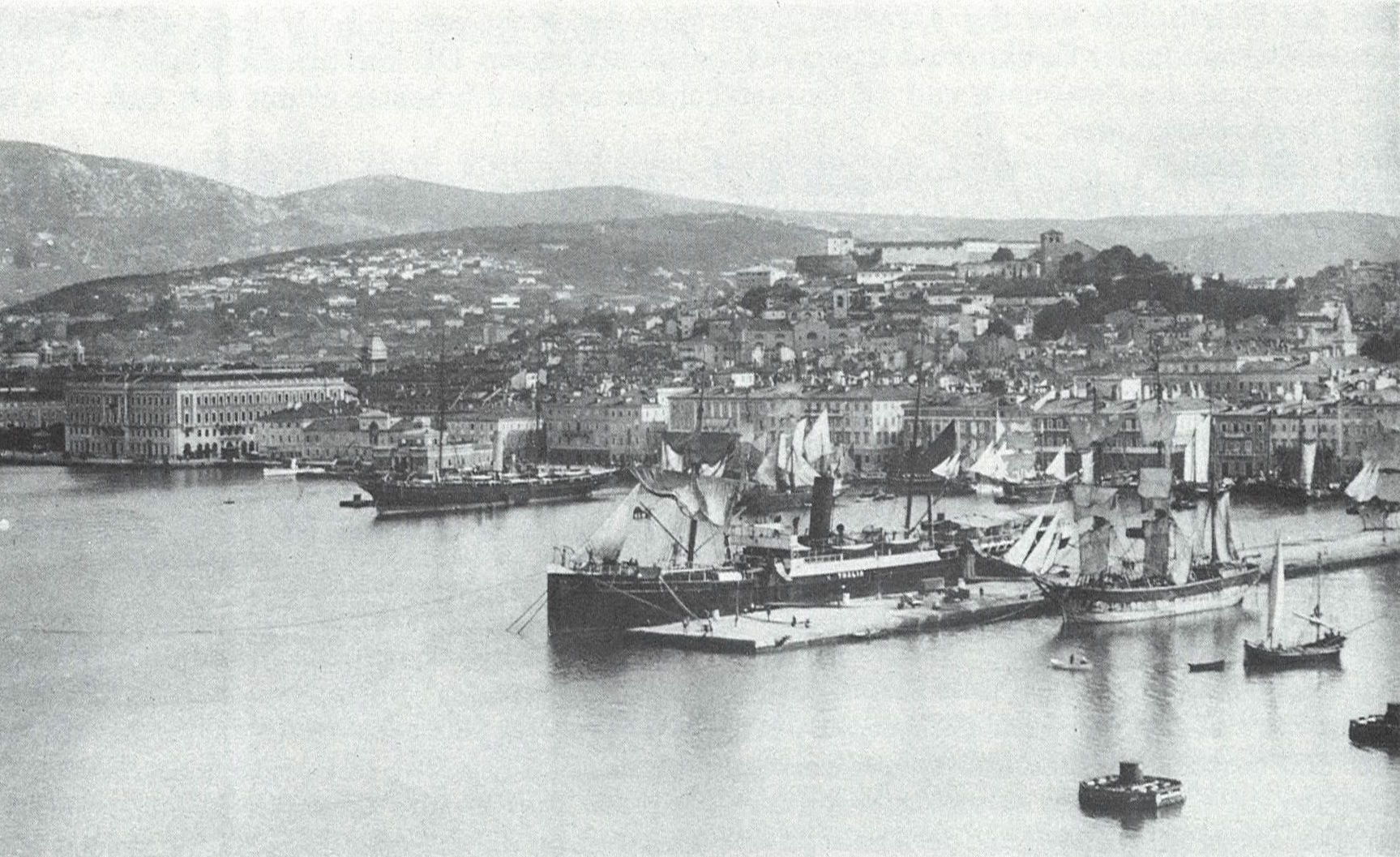
Trieste, ca. 1907

Joyce returned to Trieste in March 1907, but was unable to find full-time work. He went back to being an English instructor, working part-time for Berlitz and giving private lessons. The author Ettore Schmitz, better known by pen name Italo Svevo, was one of his students. Svevo was a Catholic of Jewish origin who became one of the models for Leopold Bloom. Joyce learned much of what he knew about Judaism from him. The two became lasting friends and mutual critics. Svevo supported Joyce's identity as an author, helping him work through his writer's block with A Portrait of the Artist as a Young Man. Roberto Prezioso, editor of the Italian newspaper Piccolo della Sera, was another of Joyce's students. He helped Joyce financially by commissioning him to write for the newspaper. Joyce quickly produced three articles aimed toward the Italian irredentists in Trieste. He indirectly paralleled their desire for independence from Austria-Hungary with the struggle against British rule in Ireland. Joyce earned additional money by giving a series of lectures at Trieste's Università Popolare on Ireland and the arts, as well as on William Shakespeare's play Hamlet.

In May, Joyce was struck by an attack of rheumatic fever, which left him incapacitated for weeks. (Note: Following Richard Ellmann's biography, a number of later biographers also state the attack was due to rheumatic fever, but evidence suggests that syphilis may have been the cause. It may have been the cause of Joyce's eye problems too. The physician J. B. Lyons makes a case that the cause was Reiter's syndrome, though he later suggested that this occurred as an aftereffect of a venereal infection.) The illness exacerbated eye problems that plagued him for the rest of his life. While Joyce was still recovering from the attack, Lucia was born on 26 July 1907. (Note: Lucia was named after the patron saint of eyesight.) During his convalescence, he was able to finish "The Dead", the last story of Dubliners.

Although a heavy drinker, Joyce gave up alcohol for a period in 1908. He reworked Stephen Hero as the more concise and interior A Portrait of the Artist as a Young Man. He completed the third chapter by April and translated John Millington Synge's Riders to the Sea into Italian with the help of Nicolò Vidacovich. He even took singing lessons again. Joyce had been looking for an English publisher for Dubliners but was unable to find one, so he submitted it to a Dublin publisher, Maunsel and Company, owned by George Roberts.

==== Visits to Dublin ====
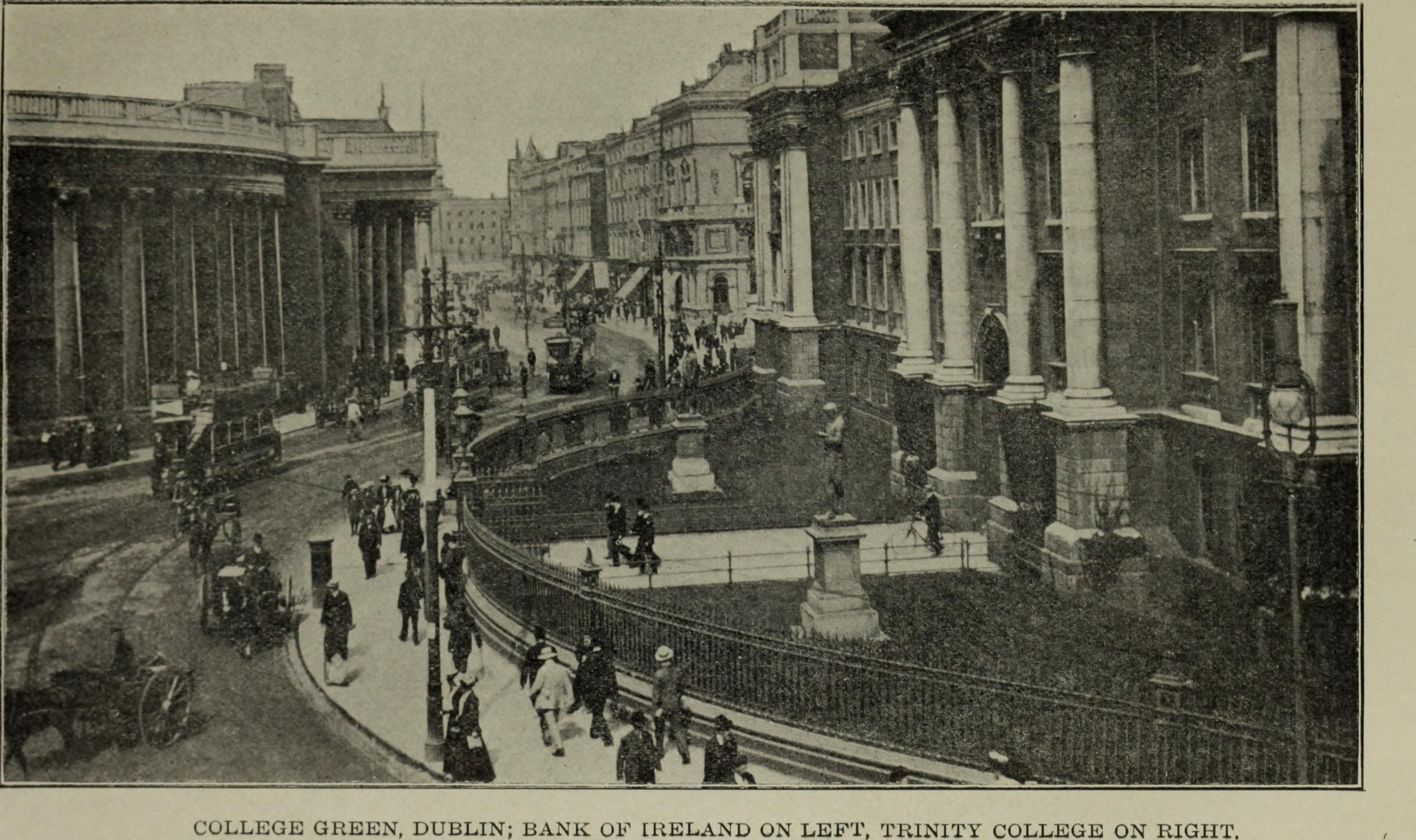
Dublin in 1909

In July 1909, Joyce received a year's advance payment from one of his students and returned to Ireland to introduce Giorgio to both sides of the family, his own in Dublin and Nora's in Galway. He unsuccessfully applied for the position of Chair of Italian at his alma mater, which had become University College Dublin. He met with Roberts, who seemed positive about publishing Dubliners. He returned to Trieste in September with his sister Eva, who helped Nora run the home. Joyce stayed in Trieste for only a month, as he almost immediately came upon the idea of starting a cinema in Dublin, which unlike Trieste had none. He quickly got the backing of some Triestine businessmen and returned to Dublin in October, launching Ireland's first cinema, the Volta Cinematograph. It was initially well-received, but fell apart after Joyce left. He returned to Trieste in January 1910 with another sister, Eileen. (Note: Eva became homesick and returned to Dublin after little more than a year, but Eileen stayed on the continent, eventually marrying a Czech bank cashier, Frantisek Schaurek. The Irish actor Paddy Joyce is their son.)

From 1910 to 1912, Joyce still lacked a reliable income. This brought his conflicts with Stanislaus, who was frustrated with lending him money, to their peak. In 1912, Prezioso arranged for him to lecture on Hamlet for the Minerva Society between November 1912 and February 1913. Joyce once more lectured at the Università Popolare on various topics in English literature and applied for a teaching diploma in English at the University of Padua. He performed very well on the qualification tests, but was denied because Italy did not recognise his degree from an Irish university. In mid-1912, Joyce and his family returned to Dublin briefly. While there, his three-year struggle with Roberts over the publication of Dubliners ended as Roberts refused to publish it due to concerns of libel. Roberts had the printed sheets destroyed, but Joyce obtained a copy of the proof sheets. (Note: It was in the midst of these frustrations with Richards in 1911 that Joyce was alleged to have thrown the manuscript of the first three chapters of A Portrait of the Artist as a Young Man into a stove fire, only to have it rescued by Eileen.) When Joyce returned to Trieste, he wrote an invective against Roberts, "Gas from a Burner". He never went to Dublin again.

==== Publication of Dubliners and A Portrait ====
Joyce's fortunes changed for the better in 1913 when Richards agreed to publish Dubliners. It was issued on 15 June 1914, eight and a half years since Joyce had first submitted it to him. Around the same time, he found an unexpected advocate in Ezra Pound, who was living in London. (Note: The literary critic Mary Colum, who was personally well-acquainted with Joyce, reports him as saying: "Pound took me out of the gutter.") On Yeats's advice, Pound wrote to Joyce asking if he could include a poem from Chamber Music, "I Hear an Army Charging upon the Land", in the journal Des Imagistes. They began a correspondence that lasted until the late 1930s. Pound became Joyce's promoter, helping ensure that Joyce's works were published and publicised.

After Pound persuaded Dora Marsden to serially publish A Portrait of the Artist as a Young Man in the London literary magazine The Egoist, Joyce's pace of writing increased. He completed A Portrait of the Artist as a Young Man by 1914; resumed Exiles, completing it in 1915; started the novelette Giacomo Joyce, which he eventually abandoned; and began drafting Ulysses.

In August 1914, World War I broke out. Although Joyce and Stanislaus were subjects of the United Kingdom, which was now at war with Austria-Hungary, they remained in Trieste. Even when Stanislaus, who had publicly expressed his sympathy for the Triestine irredentists, was interned at the beginning of January 1915, Joyce chose to stay. In May 1915, Italy declared war on Austria-Hungary, and less than a month later Joyce took his family to Zurich in neutral Switzerland.

== 1915–1920: Zurich and Trieste ==
=== Zurich ===
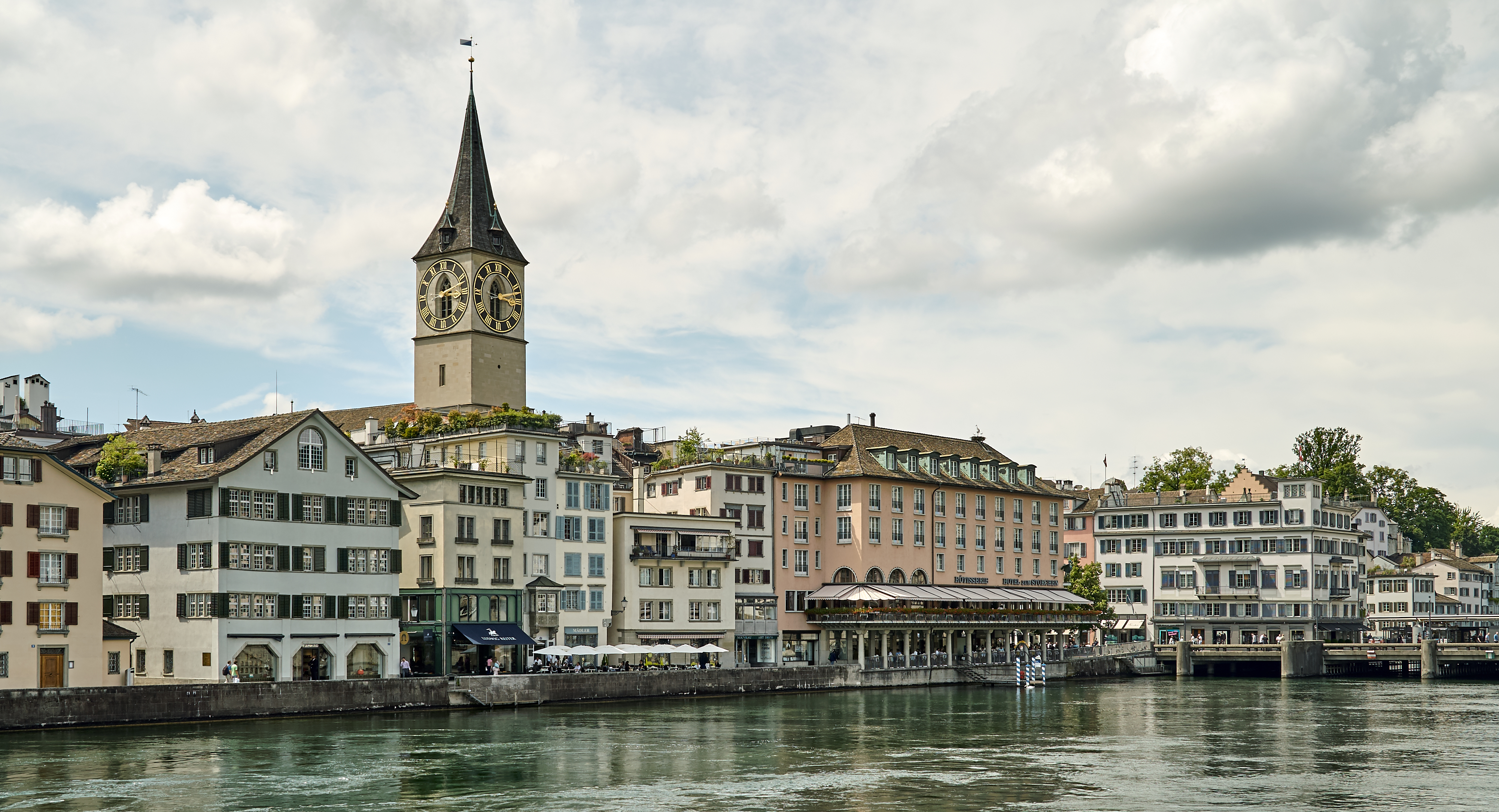
Zurich, Switzerland, where Joyce lived from 1915 to 1919

Joyce arrived in Zurich as a double exile: he was an Irishman with a British passport and a Triestine on parole from Austria-Hungary. To get to Switzerland, he had to promise the Austro-Hungarian officials that he would not help the Allies during the war, and he and his family had to leave almost all of their possessions in Trieste. During the war, both the British and Austro-Hungarian secret services kept Joyce under surveillance.

Joyce's first concern was earning a living. One of Nora's relatives sent them a small sum to cover the first few months. Pound and Yeats worked with the British government to provide a stipend from the Royal Literary Fund in 1915 and a grant from the British civil list the following year. Eventually, Joyce received large regular sums from the editor Harriet Shaw Weaver, who operated The Egoist, and the psychotherapist Edith Rockefeller McCormick, who lived in Zurich, studying under Carl Jung. Weaver financially supported Joyce for the rest of his life and even paid for his funeral. Between 1917 and the beginning of 1919, Joyce was financially secure and lived quite well; the family sometimes stayed in Locarno in Switzerland's Italian-speaking region. But Joyce's health problems persisted. During their time in Zurich, he and Nora both suffered illnesses diagnosed as "nervous breakdowns", and he underwent many eye surgeries.

==== Writing Ulysses ====
During the war, Zurich was the centre of a vibrant expatriate community. Joyce's spent evenings in the Cafe Pfauen, where he got to know some of the artists living in the city, including the sculptor August Suter and the painter Frank Budgen. He often used the time spent with them as material for Ulysses. He met the writer Stefan Zweig, who organised the premiere of Exiles in Munich in August 1919. He became aware of Dada, which was coming into its own at the Cabaret Voltaire. (Note: In 1920, Joyce wrote that the Irish press reported him as the founder of Dada.) He may have met the Marxist theoretician and revolutionary Vladimir Lenin at the Cafe Odeon, a place they both frequented.

Joyce kept up his interest in music. He met Ferruccio Busoni, staged music with Otto Luening, and learned music theory from Philipp Jarnach. Much of what Joyce learned about musical notation and counterpoint found its way into Ulysses, particularly the "Sirens" section. He also began learning Modern Greek. He was tutored by Pavlos Phocās, who described him as a philhellene in the London-based Greek-language newspaper Hē Hesperia.

Joyce avoided public discussion of the war and maintained strict neutrality. He made few comments about the 1916 Easter Rising in Ireland; although he was sympathetic to the Irish independence movement, he disagreed with its violence. (Note: Budgen wrote: "Joyce, if asked, what he did during the Great War, could reply: 'I wrote Ulysses.'") He stayed intently focused on Ulysses and the struggle to get his work published. Some of the serial instalments of "The Portrait of the Artist as a Young Man" in The Egoist had been censored by the printers, but the entire novel was published by B. W. Huebsch in 1916. In 1918, Pound got a commitment from Margaret Caroline Anderson, the owner and editor of the New York-based literary magazine The Little Review, to publish Ulysses serially.

==== The English Players ====
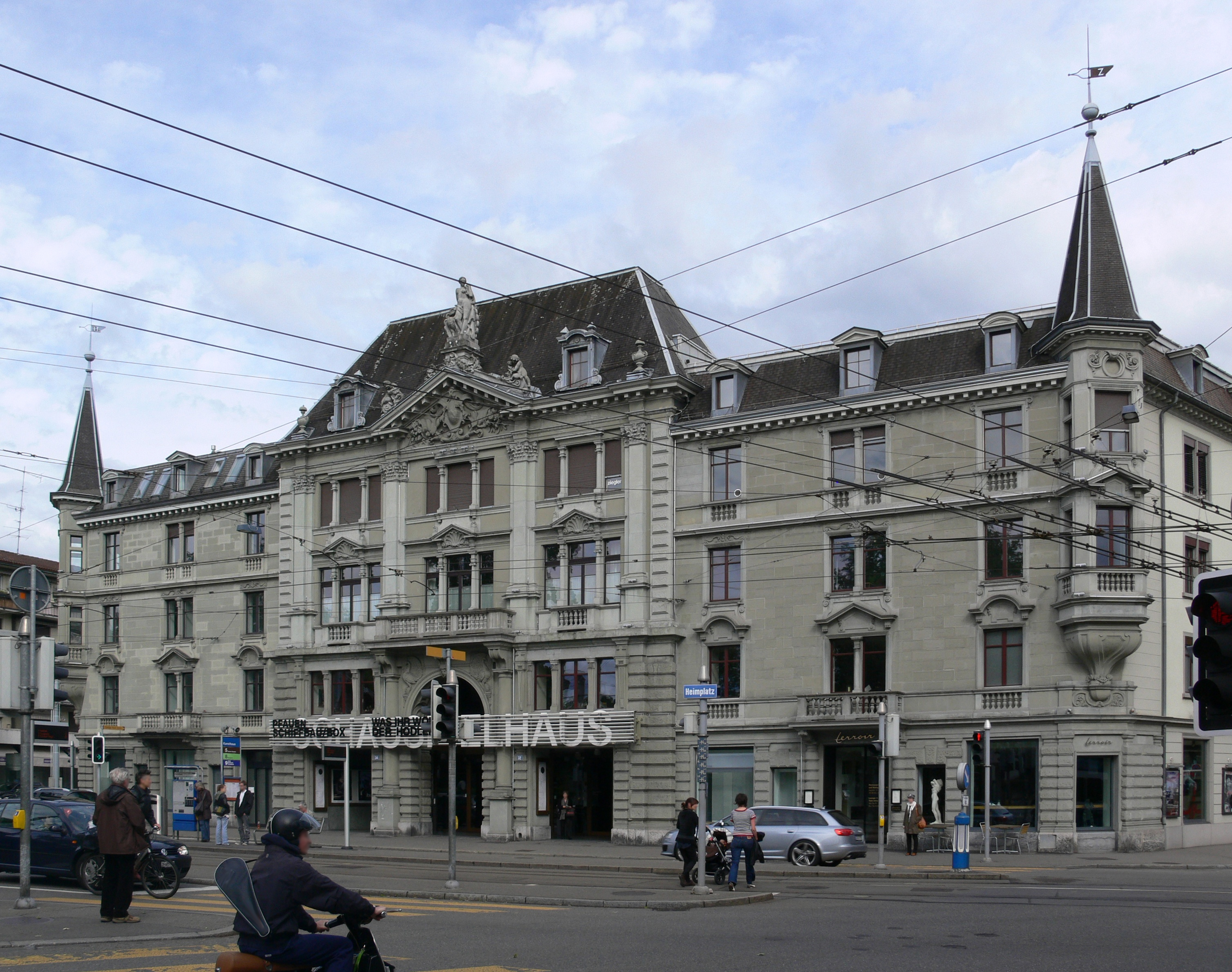
The Pfauen in Zurich. Joyce's preferred hangout was the café, which used to be on the right corner. The theatre staged the English Players.

Joyce co-founded an acting company, the English Players, and became its business manager. The company was pitched to the British government as a contribution to the war effort, and mainly staged works by Irish playwrights, such as Oscar Wilde, George Bernard Shaw, and John Millington Synge. For Synge's Riders to the Sea, Nora played a principal role and Joyce sang offstage, which he did again when Robert Browning's In a Balcony was staged. He hoped the company would eventually stage his play, Exiles, but his participation in the English Players declined in the wake of the influenza epidemic of 1918, though the company continued until 1920.

Joyce's work with the English Players involved him in a lawsuit. Henry Wilfred Carr, a wounded war veteran and British consul, accused Joyce of underpaying him for his role in The Importance of Being Earnest. Carr sued for compensation; Joyce countersued for libel. The cases were resolved in 1919, with Joyce winning the compensation case but losing the one for libel. The incident created acrimony between the British consulate and Joyce for the rest of his time in Zurich.

=== Third stay in Trieste ===
By 1919, Joyce was in financial difficulty again. McCormick stopped paying her stipend, partly because he refused to be psychoanalysed by Jung, and Zurich had become expensive to live in after the war. He was also becoming isolated as the city's emigres returned home. In October 1919, Joyce's family moved back to Trieste, but it had changed. The Austro-Hungarian empire had ceased to exist, and Trieste was now an Italian city in postwar recovery. Eight months after his return, Joyce went to Sirmione, Italy, to meet Pound, who made arrangements for him to move to Paris. Joyce and his family packed their belongings and headed for Paris in June 1920.

== 1920–1941: Paris and Zurich ==
=== Paris ===
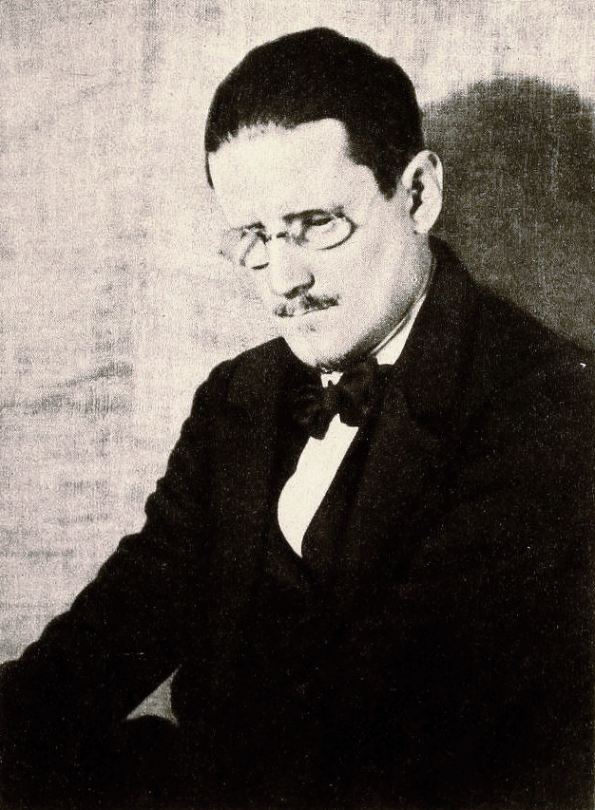
Joyce in a September 1922 issue of Shadowland, photographed by Man Ray

When Joyce and his family arrived in Paris in July 1920, their visit was intended to be a layover on their way to London. For the first four months, he stayed with Ludmila Savitzky and met Sylvia Beach, who ran the Rive Gauche bookshop, Shakespeare and Company. Beach quickly became an important person in Joyce's life, providing financial support and becoming one of his publishers. Through Beach and Pound, Joyce quickly joined the intellectual circle of Paris and was integrated into the international modernist artist community. He met Valery Larbaud, who championed Joyce's works to the French and supervised the French translation of Ulysses. Paris became the Joyces' regular residence for 20 years, though they never settled at a single location for long.

==== Publication of Ulysses ====
Joyce finished writing Ulysses near the end of 1921, but had difficulties getting it published. With financial backing from the lawyer John Quinn, (Note: Quinn was an early supporter of Joyce's work in the United States. (cf., Quinn 1917)) Margaret Anderson and her co-editor Jane Heap had begun serially publishing it in The Little Review in March 1918, but in January and May 1919, two instalments were suppressed as obscene and potentially subversive. In September 1920, an unsolicited instalment of the "Nausicaa" episode was sent to the daughter of a New York attorney associated with the New York Society for the Suppression of Vice, leading to an official complaint. The trial proceedings continued until February 1921, when Anderson and Heap, defended by Quinn, were fined $50 each for publishing obscenity and ordered to cease publishing Ulysses. Huebsch, who had expressed interest in publishing the novel in the United States, decided against it after the trial. Weaver was unable to find an English printer, and the novel was banned for obscenity in the United Kingdom in 1922, where it was blacklisted until 1936.

Announcement of the initial publication of Ulysses

Almost immediately after Anderson and Heap were ordered to stop printing Ulysses, Beach agreed to publish it through her bookshop. She had books mailed to people in Paris and the United States who had subscribed to get a copy; Weaver sent books from Beach's plates to subscribers in England. Soon, the postal officials of both countries began confiscating the books. They were then smuggled into both countries. (Note: Ernest Hemingway became involved in smuggling copies of Ulysses into the United States from Canada.) Because the work had no copyright in the United States at this time, "bootleg" versions appeared, including pirate versions from publisher Samuel Roth, who ceased his actions only in 1928, when a court enjoined publication. Ulysses was not legally published in the United States until 1934, when Judge John M. Woolsey ruled in United States v. One Book Called Ulysses that the book is not obscene.

==== Writing Finnegans Wake ====
In 1923, Joyce began his next work, an experimental novel that became Finnegans Wake. (Note: In March 1923, Joyce wrote "Yesterday I wrote two pages—the first I have since the final Yes of Ulysses. Having found a pen, with some difficulty I copied them out in a large handwriting on a double sheet of foolscap so that I could read them. Il lupo perde il pelo ma non il vizio, the Italians say. 'The wolf may lose his skin but not his vice' or 'the leopard cannot change his spots.") It took 16 years to complete. At first, Joyce called it Work in Progress, which was the name Ford Madox Ford used in April 1924 when he published its "Mamalujo" episode in his magazine, The Transatlantic Review. In 1926, Eugene and Maria Jolas serialised the novel in their magazine, transition. When parts of the novel first came out, some of Joyce's supporters—like Stanislaus, Pound, and Weaver— wrote unfavourably about it, and it was criticised by writers like Seán Ó Faoláin, Wyndham Lewis, and Rebecca West. In response, Joyce and the Jolases organised the publication of a collection of favourable essays, Our Exagmination Round His Factification for Incamination of Work in Progress, to which Samuel Beckett and William Carlos Williams contributed. An additional purpose of publishing these essays was to market Work in Progress to a larger audience. Joyce publicly revealed the novel's title as Finnegans Wake in 1939, the year he completed it. It was published in London by Faber and Faber with the assistance of T. S. Eliot. (Note: Joyce met T. S. Eliot in Paris in 1923. Eliot became a strong advocate of Joyce's work, arranging publication of parts of Work in Progress, the first complete edition of Finnegans Wake with Faber and Faber and editing the first anthology of Joyce's work the year after his death.)

Joyce's health problems afflicted him throughout his Paris years. He had over a dozen eye operations, but his vision severely declined. By 1930, he was practically blind in the left eye, and his right eye functioned poorly. He had all his teeth removed because of infection. At one point, Joyce became worried that he could not finish Finnegans Wake, asking the Irish author James Stephens to complete it if he became unable.

Joyce's financial problems continued. Although he was now earning a good income from his investments and royalties, his spending habits often left him without available money. Still, he published Pomes Penyeach in 1927, a collection of 13 poems that he wrote in Trieste, Zurich and Paris.

==== Marriage in London ====
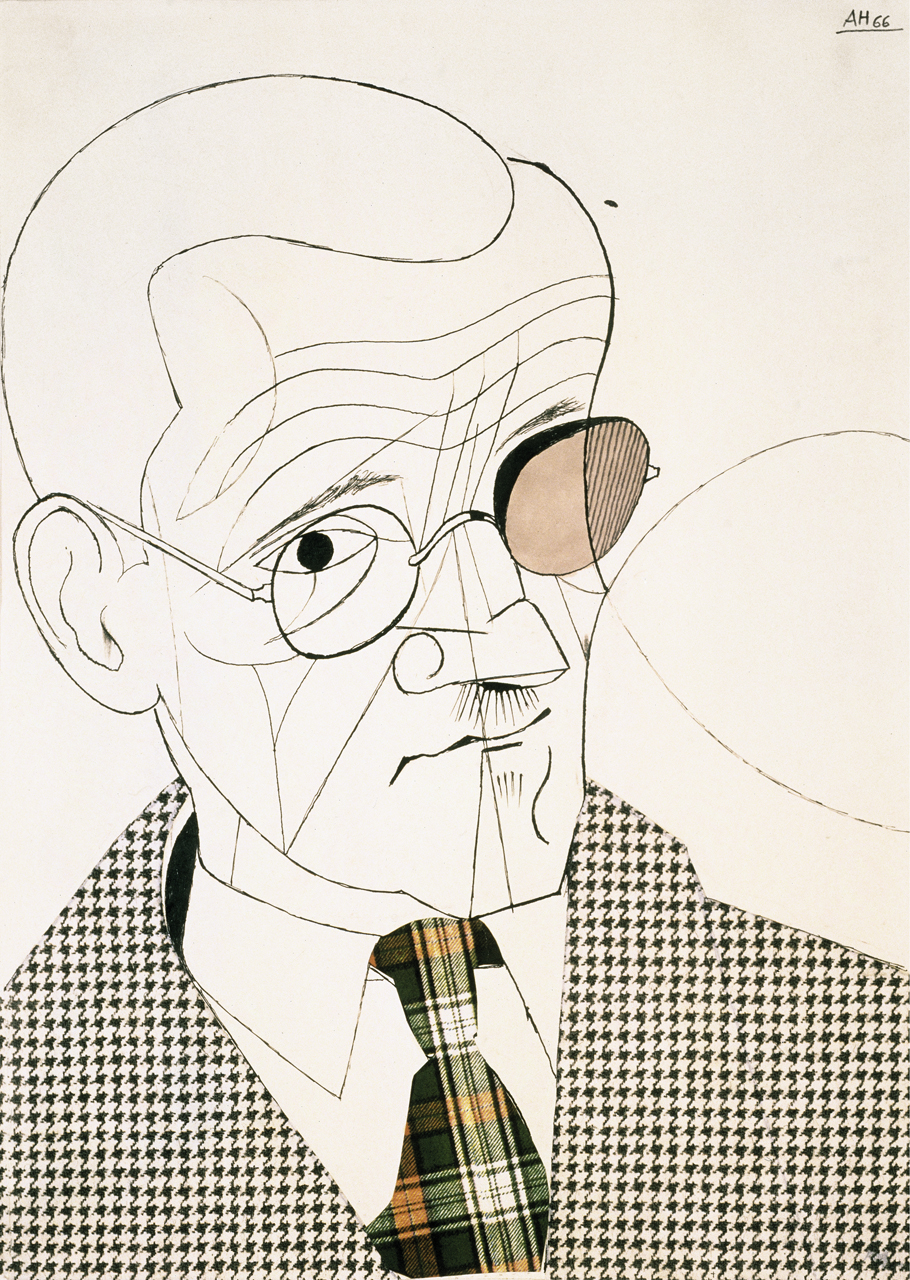
1966 drawing of Joyce by Adolf Hoffmeister

In 1930, Joyce began thinking of establishing a residence in London once more, primarily to ensure that Giorgio, who had just married Helen Fleischmann, would have his inheritance secured under British law. Joyce moved to London, obtained a long-term lease on a flat, registered on the electoral roll, and became liable for jury service. After having lived together for 27 years, Joyce and Nora married at the Register Office in Kensington on 4 July 1931. Joyce stayed in London for at least six months to establish his residency, but abandoned his flat and returned to Paris later in the year when Lucia showed signs of mental illness. He planned to return, but never did, and later became disaffected with England.

In later years, Joyce lived in Paris but frequently travelled to Switzerland for eye surgery (Note: He still retained his sense of humour and appreciation of music during these difficult times. For example, Joyce heard the composer Othmar Schoeck's Song Cycle based on the poems of Gottfried Keller, Lebendig begraben [Buried Alive], while visiting Zurich in 1935. Afterwards, he went to Schoeck's house unannounced and dressed as a tramp to introduce himself to him. He later obtained Keller's poems and began to translate them.) or for treatment for Lucia, who was diagnosed with schizophrenia. Lucia was analysed by Jung, who had previously written that Ulysses was similar to schizophrenic writing. (Note: Jung also states: "It would never occur to me to class Ulysses as a product of schizophrenia ... Ulysses is no more a pathological product than modern art as a whole.") Jung suggested that she and her father were two people going into a river, with Joyce diving and Lucia falling. Despite Joyce's attempts to help Lucia, she remained permanently institutionalised after his death.

=== Final return to Zurich ===
In the late 1930s, Joyce became increasingly concerned about the rise of fascism and antisemitism. In 1938, he helped Jews escape Nazi persecution. After the fall of France in 1940, Joyce and his family fled from Nazi occupation, returning to Zurich a final time.

== Death ==
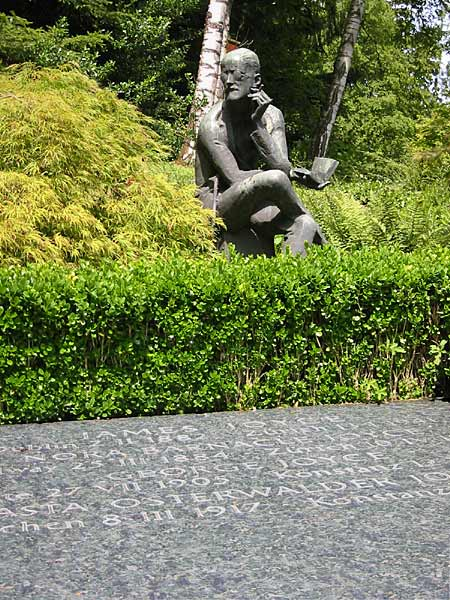
Grave of Joyce and his family in Zurich-Fluntern; sculpture by Milton Hebald

On 11 January 1941, Joyce underwent surgery in Zurich for a perforated duodenal ulcer. He fell into a coma the next day. He awoke at 2 am on 13 January 1941, and asked a nurse to call his wife and son. They were en route when he died 15 minutes later, at age 58.

His body was buried in the Fluntern Cemetery in Zurich. Swiss tenor Max Meili sang "Addio terra, addio cielo" from Monteverdi's L'Orfeo at the burial service. Joyce had been a subject of the United Kingdom all of his life, and although two senior Irish diplomats were in Switzerland at the time, only the British consul attended the funeral. When Frank Cremins, chargé d'affaires at Bern, informed Joseph Walshe, secretary at the Department of External Affairs in Dublin, of Joyce's death, Walshe responded: "Please wire details of Joyce's death. If possible find out did he die a Catholic? Express sympathy with Mrs Joyce and explain inability to attend funeral." Buried originally in an ordinary grave, Joyce was moved in 1966 to a more prominent "honour grave", with a seated portrait statue by American artist Milton Hebald nearby. Nora survived him by 10 years. She is buried by his side, as is their son Giorgio, who died in 1976.

After Joyce's death, the Irish government declined Nora's request to permit the repatriation of his remains, despite being persistently lobbied by the American diplomat John J. Slocum. In October 2019, a motion was put to Dublin City Council to plan and budget for the costs of the exhumations and reburials of Joyce and his family somewhere in Dublin, subject to his family's wishes. The proposal immediately became controversial, with the Irish Times commenting: "it is hard not to suspect that there is a calculating, even mercantile, aspect to contemporary Ireland's relationship to its great writers, whom we are often more keen to 'celebrate', and if possible monetise, than read".

== Political views ==
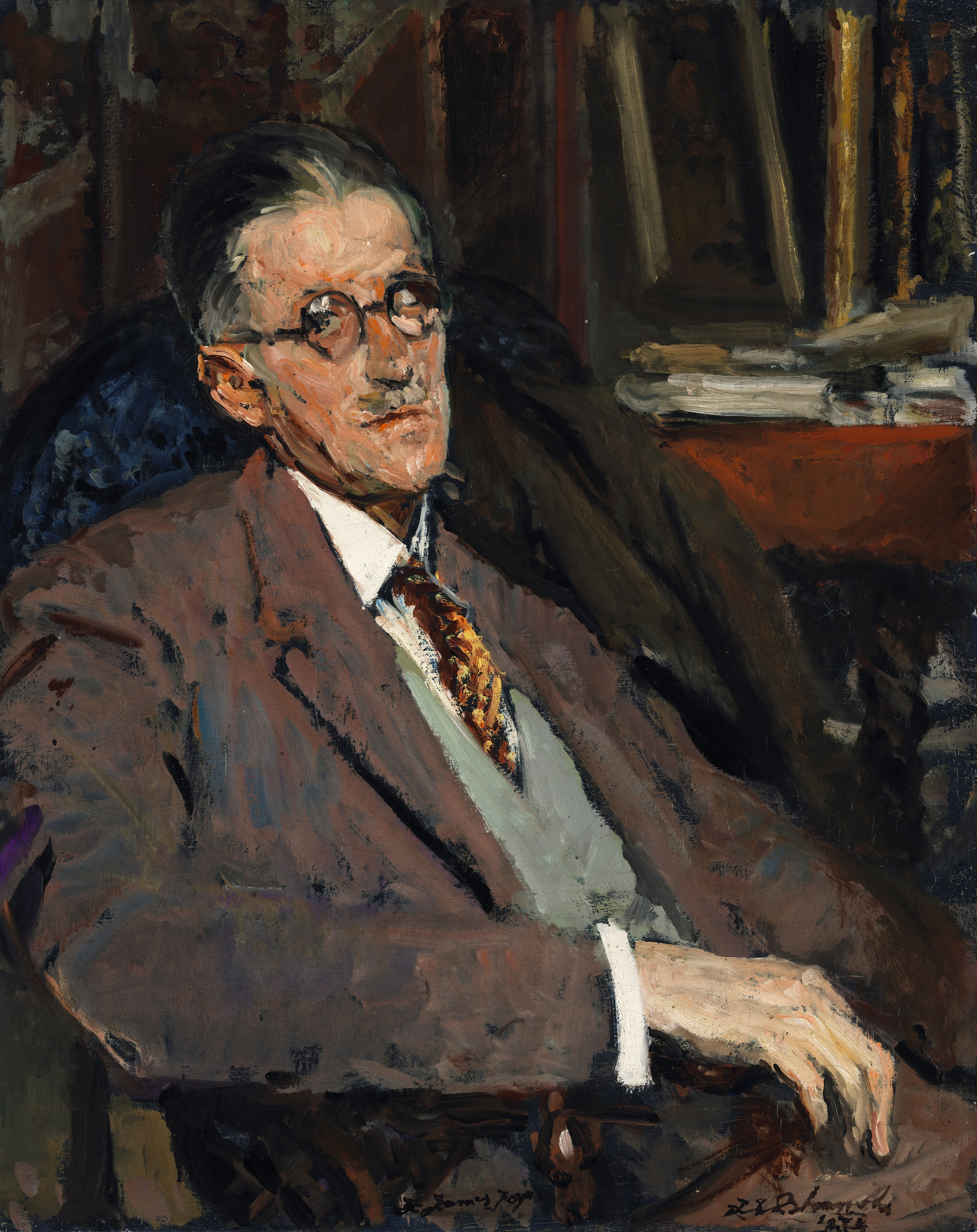
1934 portrait of Joyce by Jacques-Émile Blanche

Throughout his life, Joyce maintained an active interest in Irish politics and the country's relationship to the British Empire. He studied socialism and anarchism. (Note: A footnote that Joyce allowed in Gorman's biography, which was written in the 1930s, states: "Among the many whose works he [Joyce] had read may be mentioned Most, Malatesta, Stirner, Bakunin, Élisée Reclus, Spencer and Benjamin Tucker.") He attended socialist meetings and expressed an individualist anarchist view influenced by Benjamin Tucker's philosophy and Oscar Wilde's essay "The Soul of Man Under Socialism". He described his opinions as "those of a socialist artist". Joyce's direct engagement in politics was strongest during his time in Trieste, when he submitted newspaper articles, gave lectures, and wrote letters advocating for Ireland's independence from British rule. After leaving Trieste, Joyce's direct involvement in politics waned, but his later works still reflect his commitment. He remained sympathetic to individualist anarchism and critical of coercive ideologies, such as nationalism. (Note: In 1918, Joyce declared himself "against every state", and later in the 1930s he said of the defeated multi-ethnic Hapsburg Empire: "They called the Empire a ramshackle empire, I wish to God there were more such empires.") His novels address socialist, anarchist, and Irish nationalist issues. Ulysses has been read as a critique of the effect of British rule on the Irish people. Finnegans Wake has been read as an investigation of the divisive issues of Irish politics, the interrelationship between colonialism and race, and the coercive oppression of nationalism and fascism.

Joyce wrote critically of British rule in Ireland and was sympathetic to attempts to establish an independent Irish republic. In 1907, he expressed his support for the early Sinn Féin movement before the establishment of the Irish Free State in 1922. But Joyce refused to exchange his British passport for an Irish one. When he had a choice, he renewed his British passport in 1935 instead of obtaining one from the Irish Free State, (Note: When Joyce had to renew his passport while residing in Paris during 1935, he wrote Georgio afterwards: "Giorni fa dovevo far rinnovare il mio passaporto. L'impiegato mi disse che aveva ordini di mandare gente come me alla legazione irlandese. Insistetti ed ottenni un altro." [A few days ago I had to have my [British] passport renewed. The clerk told me that he had orders to send people like me to the Irish legation. I insisted and got another one.]) and chose to keep it in 1940 when accepting an Irish passport could have helped him to leave Vichy France more easily. His refusal to change his passport was partly due to the advantages a British passport gave him internationally, his being out of sympathy with the violence of Irish politics, and his dismay over the Irish Free State's political alignment with the Catholic Church. (Note: Svevo writes: "He is twice a rebel, against England and against Ireland. He hates England and would like to transform Ireland. Yet he belongs so much to England that like a great many of his Irish predecessors he will fill pages of English literary history.")

== Religious views ==
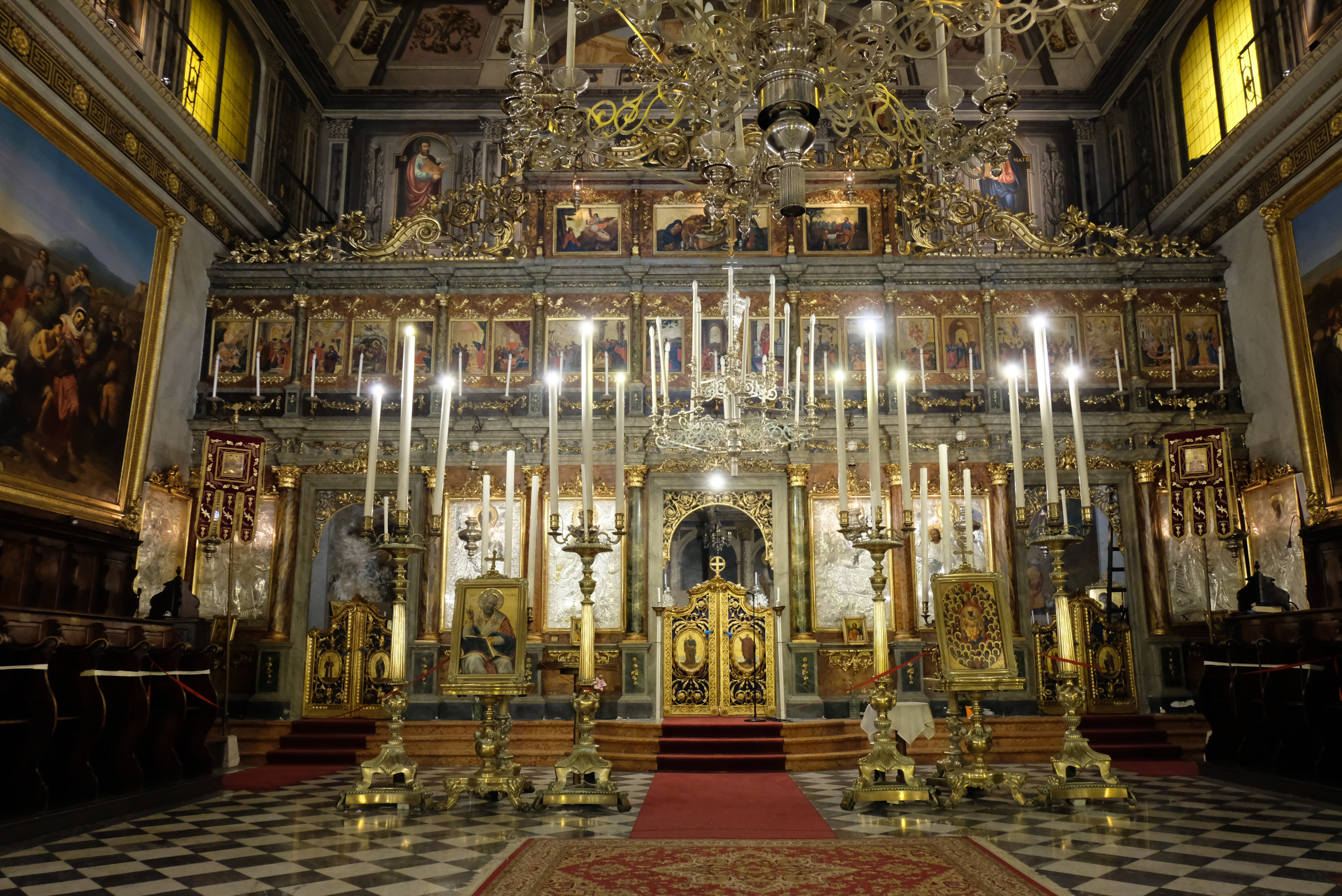
The interior of the Greek Orthodox Church of San Nicolò dei Greci in Trieste, where Joyce occasionally attended services

Joyce had a complex relationship with religion. Joyce lapsed from the Church early in life, and firsthand statements by him (Note: In 1904 Joyce declared to Nora, who he had just recently met: "My mind rejects the whole present social order and Christianity—home, the recognised virtues, classes of life and religious doctrines ... Six years ago I left the Catholic church, hating it most fervently. I found it impossible for me to remain in it on account of the impulses of my nature. I made secret war upon it when I was a student and declined to accept the positions it offered me. By doing this I made myself a beggar, but I retained my pride. Now I make open war upon it by what I write and say and do.") and Stanislaus (Note: Stanislaus wrote: "It has become a fashion with some of my brother's critics ... to represent him as a man pining for the ancient Church he had abandoned, and at a loss for moral support without the religion in which he was bred. Nothing could be further from the truth. I am convinced that there was never any crisis of belief. The vigour of life within him drove him out of the church".) attest that he did not consider himself a Catholic, though his work is deeply influenced by Catholicism. In particular, his intellectual foundations were grounded in his early Jesuit education. (Note: Colum states: "I have never known anyone with a mind so fundamentally Catholic in structure as Joyce's own, or one on whom the Church, its ceremonies, symbols, and theological declarations had made such an impress".) Even after he left Ireland, he sometimes went to church. When living in Trieste, he woke up early to attend Mass on Holy Thursday and Good Friday (Note: Joyce told Stanislaus "The Mass on Good Friday seems to me a very great drama.") and occasionally attended Eastern Orthodox services, saying he liked the ceremonies better.

Joyce's wife Nora refused to allow a Catholic service when he died. (Note: When a Catholic priest offered to perform a religious service for Joyce's burial, Nora declined, saying, "I couldn't do that to him.") His works frequently critique, ridicule, and blaspheme Catholicism, and he appropriates Catholic rituals and concepts for his own artistic purposes. Some critics have therefore argued that Joyce firmly rejected Catholicism, but Catholic critics have argued that Joyce never fully abandoned his faith, wrestling with it in his writings and becoming increasingly reconciled to it. They regard Ulysses and Finnegans Wake as expressions of a Catholic sensibility, insisting that the critical views of religion the characters in his novels express are not those of the author.

Other critics have suggested that Joyce's apparent apostasy was less a denial of faith than a transmutation, a criticism of the Church's adverse effect on spiritual life, politics, and personal development. His attitude toward Catholicism has been described as an enigma in which there are two Joyces: a modern one who resisted the power of Catholicism and another who maintained his allegiance to its traditions. He has been compared to the medieval episcopi vagantes (wandering bishops), who left their discipline but not their cultural heritage of thought.

Joyce's responses to questions about his faith were often ambiguous. For example, during an interview after the completion of Ulysses, Joyce was asked, "When did you leave the Catholic Church?" He answered, "That's for the Church to say."

== Major works ==
=== Dubliners ===
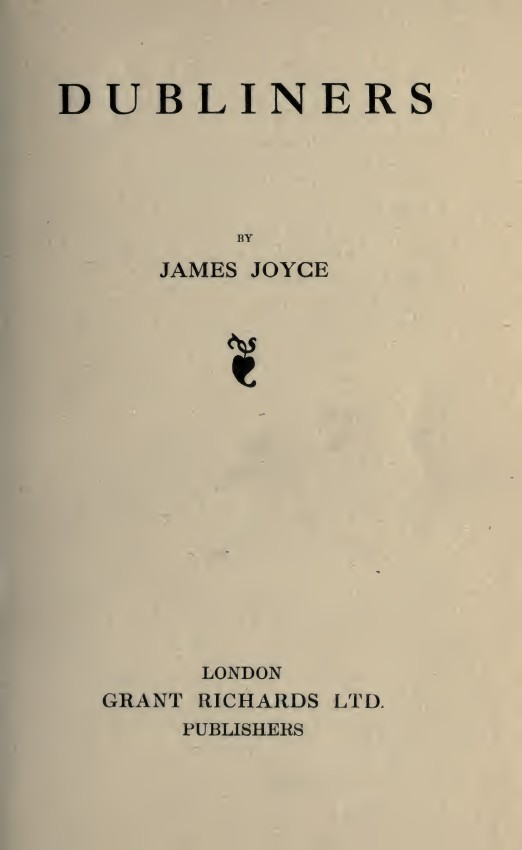
First edition of Dubliners; published by Grant Richards in London, 1914

Dubliners, first published in 1914, is a collection of 15 short stories that form a naturalistic depiction of Irish middle-class life in and around the city in the early 20th century. The tales were written when Irish nationalism and the search for national identity was at its peak. Joyce holds up a mirror to that identity as a first step in the spiritual liberation of Ireland. (Note: Svevo writes that "what is fundamental in Joyce can be found entire in [Dubliners]".) The stories centre on Joyce's idea of an epiphany: a moment when a character experiences a life-changing self-understanding or illumination. Many of the characters in Dubliners later appear in minor roles in Joyce's novel Ulysses. The initial stories are narrated by child protagonists. Later stories deal with the lives and concerns of progressively older people. This aligns with Joyce's tripartite division of the collection into childhood, adolescence, and maturity.

=== A Portrait of the Artist as a Young Man ===
A Portrait of the Artist as a Young Man, published in 1916, is a shortened rewrite of the novel Stephen Hero, which was abandoned in 1905. It is a Künstlerroman, a kind of coming-of-age novel depicting the childhood and adolescence of the protagonist Stephen Dedalus and his gradual growth into artistic self-consciousness. It functions both as an autobiographical fiction of the author and a biography of the fictional protagonist. Some hints of the techniques Joyce frequently employed in later works, such as stream of consciousness, interior monologue, and references to a character's psychic reality rather than to his external surroundings, are evident in this novel.

=== Exiles and poetry ===
Despite early interest in the theatre, Joyce published only one play, Exiles, begun shortly after the outbreak of the First World War in 1914 and published in 1918. A study of a husband-and-wife relationship, the play looks back to "The Dead" (the final story in Dubliners) and forward to Ulysses, which Joyce began around the time of the play's composition.

He published three books of poetry. The first full-length collection was Chamber Music (1907), which consisted of 36 short lyrics. It led to his inclusion in the Imagist Anthology, edited by Ezra Pound, a champion of Joyce's work. Other poetry Joyce published in his lifetime includes "Gas from a Burner" (1912), Pomes Penyeach (1927), and "Ecce Puer" (written in 1932 to mark the birth of his grandson and the recent death of his father). These were published by the Black Sun Press in Collected Poems (1936).

=== Ulysses ===
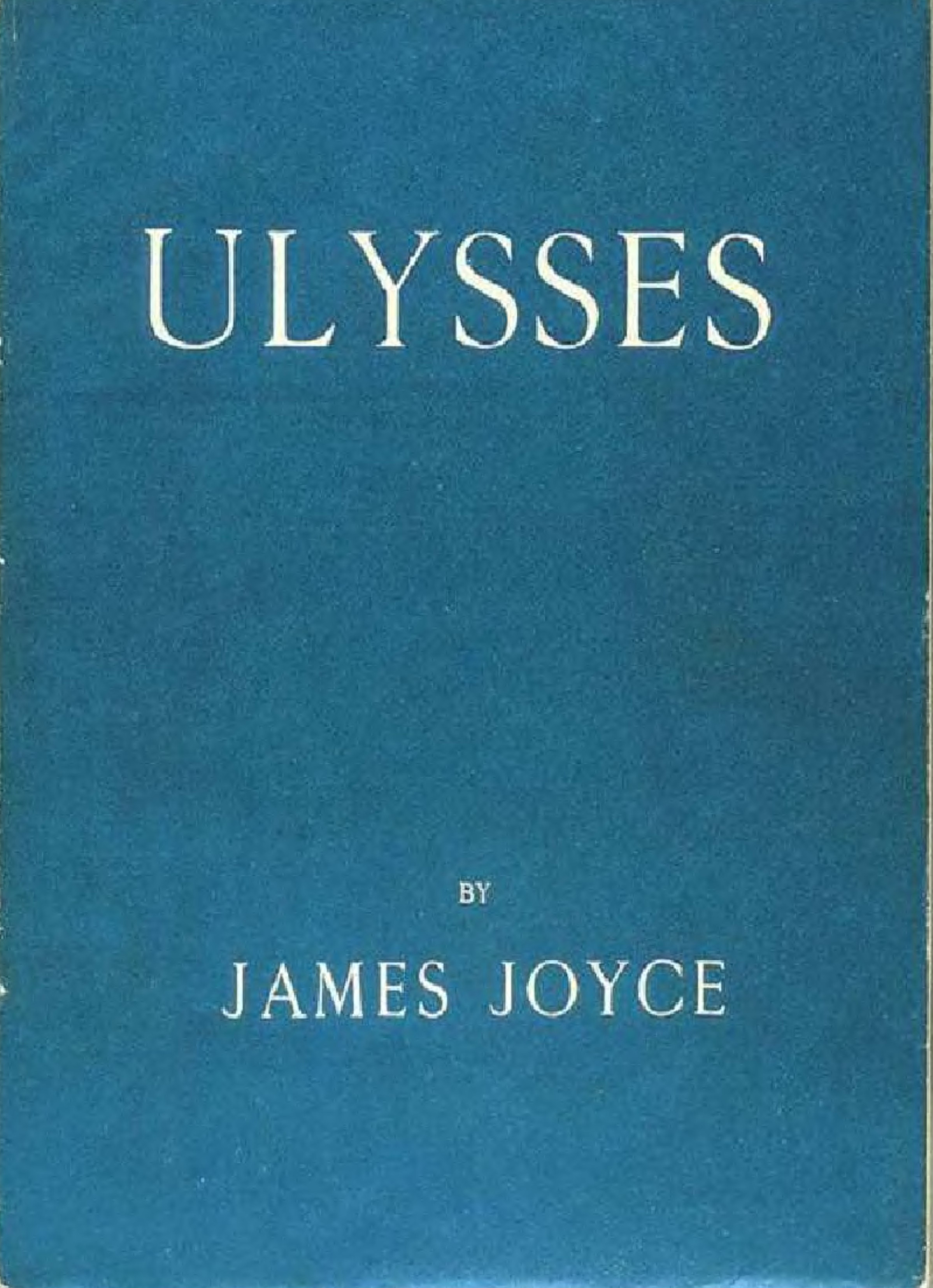
First edition of Ulysses; published by Shakespeare & Company in Paris, 1922

The action of Ulysses starts on 16 June 1904 at 8 am and ends sometime after 2 am the next morning. Much of it occurs inside the minds of the characters, who are portrayed through techniques such as interior monologue, dialogue, and soliloquy. The novel has 18 episodes, each covering roughly one hour of the day in a unique literary style. Each chapter refers to an episode in Homer's Odyssey, as well as a specific colour, a particular art or science, and a bodily organ. (Note: This structure was not part of the original conception of Ulysses, but by 1921, Joyce was circulating two versions of this structure, known as the Linati schema and Gilbert schema.) Ulysses sets the characters and incidents of the Odyssey in 1904 Dublin, representing Odysseus (Ulysses), Penelope, and Telemachus in the characters of Leopold Bloom, his wife Molly Bloom, and Stephen Dedalus. It uses humour, including parody, satire and comedy, to contrast the novel's characters with their Homeric models. Joyce played down the mythic correspondences by eliminating the chapter titles so the work could be read independently of its Homeric structure.

Ulysses can be read as a study of Dublin in 1904, exploring various aspects of the city's life, dwelling on its squalor and monotony. Joyce claimed that if Dublin was destroyed in some catastrophe, it could be rebuilt using his work as a model. To achieve this sense of detail, he relied on his memory, what he heard other people remember, and his readings, to create a sense of fastidious detail. Joyce regularly used the 1904 edition of Thom's Directory—a work that listed the owners and tenants of every residential and commercial property in the city—to ensure his descriptions were accurate. This combination of kaleidoscopic writing, reliance on a formal schema to structure the narrative, and exquisite attention to detail represents one of the book's major contributions to the development of 20th-century modernist literature.

=== Finnegans Wake ===
Finnegans Wake is an experimental novel that pushes stream of consciousness and literary allusion to their extremes. It can be read from beginning to end, but Joyce's writing transforms traditional ideas of plot and character development through his wordplay, allowing the book to be read non-linearly. Much of the wordplay stems from peculiar and obscure English, based mainly on complex multilevel puns. This approach is similar to, but far more extensive than, Lewis Carroll's in Jabberwocky and draws on a wide range of languages. The associative nature of its language has led to its being interpreted as the story of a dream. (Note: Attridge 2013 also critiques interpreting Finnegans Wake as a dream narrative.)

The metaphysics of Giordano Bruno of Nola, whom Joyce read in his youth, plays an important role in Finnegans Wake, as it provides the framework for how the characters' identities interplay and are transformed. Giambattista Vico's cyclical view of history—in which civilisation rises from chaos, passes through theocratic, aristocratic, and democratic phases, and then lapses back into chaos—structures the text's narrative, as evidenced by the book's opening and closing words: Finnegans Wake opens, "riverrun, past Eve and Adam's, from swerve of shore to bend of bay, brings us by a commodius vicus of recirculation back to Howth Castle and Environs", and ends, "A way a lone a last a loved a long the". Thus the book ends with the beginning of a sentence and begins with the end of that sentence, turning the narrative into one great cycle.

== Legacy ==
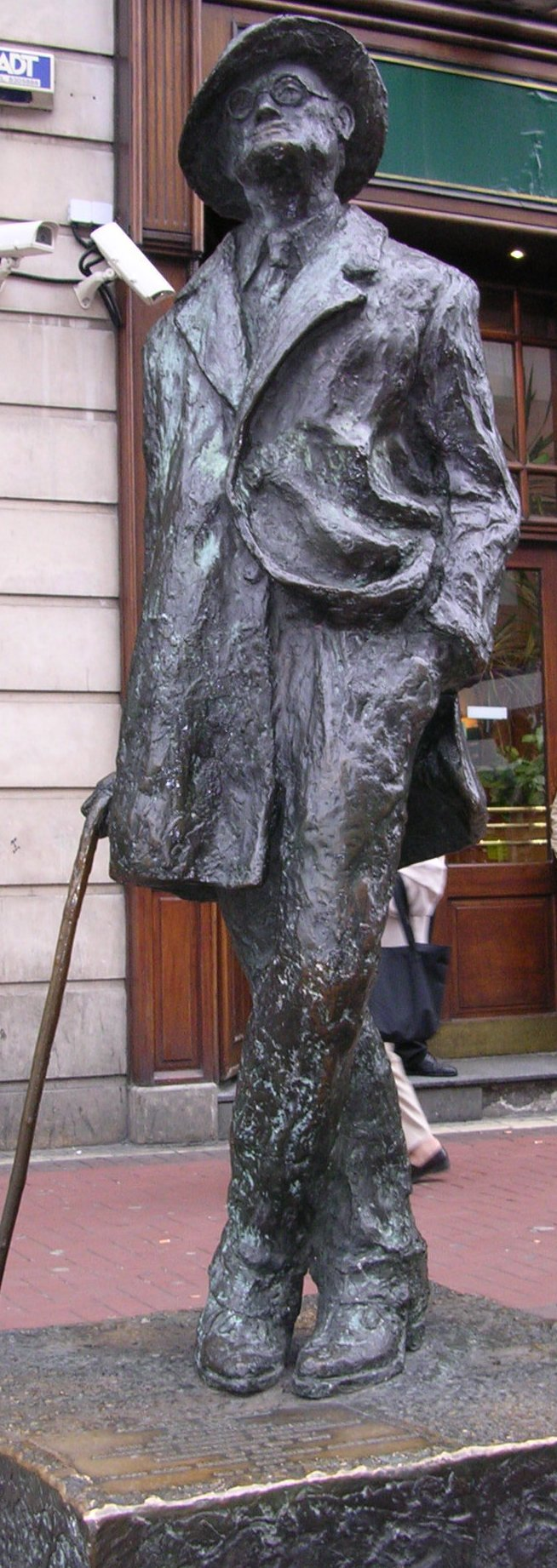
Statue of Joyce on North Earl Street, Dublin, by Marjorie Fitzgibbon

Joyce's work still has a profound influence on contemporary culture. (Note: See TMO n.d. and Nastasi 2014 for examples of various authors' responses to Joyce.) Ulysses is a model for fiction writers, particularly its explorations into the power of language. Its emphasis on the details of everyday life has opened up new possibilities of expression for authors, painters and film-makers. It retains its prestige among readers, often ranking high on 'Great Book' lists. Joyce's innovations extend beyond English literature: his writing has been an inspiration for Latin American writers, and Finnegans Wake has become one of the key texts for French post-structuralism.

The open-ended form of Joyce's novels keeps them open to constant reinterpretation. They inspire an increasingly global community of literary critics. Joyce's studies—based on a relatively small canon of three novels, a small short story collection, one play, and two small books of poems—have generated over 15,000 articles, monographs, theses, translations, and editions.

In popular culture, the work and life of Joyce is celebrated annually on 16 June, known as Bloomsday, in Dublin and in an increasing number of cities worldwide.

=== Collections, museums, and study centres ===
==== Ireland ====
The National Library of Ireland has a large collection of Joycean material, including manuscripts and notebooks, much of it available online. A joint venture between the library and University College Dublin, the Museum of Literature Ireland, the majority of whose exhibits are about Joyce and his work, has a small permanent Joyce-related collection and borrows from its parent institutions; its displays include "Copy No. 1" of Ulysses. Dedicated centres in Dublin include the James Joyce Centre in North Great George's Street, the James Joyce Tower and Museum in Sandycove at the Martello tower where Joyce briefly lived and where he set the opening scene in Ulysses, and the Dublin Writers Museum.

==== United Kingdom ====
University College London (UCL) holds the United Kingdom's only major research collection of Joyce's work, including first editions of all his major works, many other editions and translations, and critical and background literature. UCL also has an archive collection of Joyce-related material that includes letters to Jane Lidderdale and Harriet Shaw Weaver and papers relating to and by Joyce's daughter Lucia.

==== United States ====
The University at Buffalo's James Joyce Collection has more than 10,000 pages of Joyce's working papers, notebooks, manuscripts, photographs, correspondence and other materials, and Joyce's private library.

== Published work ==
=== Novels ===
==== Stephen Dedalus ====
- Stephen Hero (written 1904–06, posthumous publication by Jonathan Cape, 1944 (revised 1956 and 1963); precursor to A Portrait, completed but preserved in fragment)
- A Portrait of the Artist as a Young Man (B. W. Huebsch, 1916, corrected 1964)
- Ulysses (Shakespeare and Company, 1922)

==== Finnegan ====
- Finn's Hotel (written 1923, posthumous publication by Ithys Press, 2013; alleged precursor to Finnegans)
- Finnegans Wake (Faber & Faber, 1939, restored by Penguin Classics, 2012)

=== Short stories ===
- Dubliners (Grant Richards Ltd., 1914)
- The Cat and the Devil (written 1936, posthumous publication by Faber & Faber, 1965)
- The Cats of Copenhagen (written 1936, posthumous publication by Ithys Press, 2012)

=== Poetry ===
- Chamber Music (Elkin Mathews, 1907)
- Giacomo Joyce (written 1907, posthumous publication by Faber & Faber, 1968)
- Pomes Penyeach (Shakespeare and Company, 1927)
- Collected Poems (Black Sun Press, 1936; includes Chamber Music, Pomes Penyeach and other previously published works)

=== Play ===
- Exiles (Grant Richards Ltd., 1918)

=== Posthumous non-fiction ===
- The Critical Writings of James Joyce (Eds. Ellsworth Mason and Richard Ellmann, 1959)
- Letters of James Joyce Vol. 1 (Ed. Stuart Gilbert, 1957)
- Letters of James Joyce Vol. 2 (Ed. Richard Ellmann, 1966)
- Letters of James Joyce Vol. 3 (Ed. Richard Ellmann, 1966)
- Selected Letters of James Joyce (Ed. Richard Ellmann, 1975)
- Collected Epiphanies of James Joyce: A Critical Edition (Eds. Angus McFadzean, Morris Beja, Sangam Macduff, 2024)

== Sources ==
=== Books ===
- Atherton, James S. (1960). Books at the Wake: A Study of Literary allusions in James Joyce's Finnegans Wake. Viking Press. OCLC 1148024288.
- Attridge, Derek (1997). "Reading Joyce". In Attridge, Derek (ed.). The Cambridge Companion to James Joyce. Cambridge University Press. pp. 1–30. ISBN 0-521-37673-4. OCLC 1148222842.
- Attridge, Derek (2007). How to Read Joyce. Granta Books. ISBN 978-1-86207-912-0. OCLC 1149525874.
- Beja, Morris (1992). James Joyce: A Literary Life. Ohio State University Press. ISBN 0-8142-0598-4. OCLC 964127996.
- Beckett, Samuel (1961) [1929]. "Dante... Bruno. Vico.. Joyce". Our Exagmination Round his Factification for Incamination of Work in Progress. Faber and Faber. pp. 1–22. OCLC 1150935903.
- Biggers, Shirley Hoover (2015). British Author House Museums and Other Memorials: A Guide to Sites in England, Ireland, Scotland and Wales. McFarland. ISBN 978-1-4766-0022-2. OCLC 606882695.
- Birmingham, Kevin (2014). The Most dangerous book: The Battle for James Joyce Ulysses. Head of Zeus. ISBN 978-1-78408-072-3. OCLC 894758831.
- Bowker, Gordon (2012). James Joyce: A New Biography. Farrar, Straus and Giroux. ISBN 978-0-374-17872-7. OCLC 802264865.
- Boyle, Robert (1978). James Joyce's Pauline Vision: A Catholic Exposition. Southern Illinois University Press. ISBN 0-8093-0861-4. OCLC 1150108528.
- Bulson, Eric (2006). The Cambridge Introduction to James Joyce. Cambridge University Press. ISBN 1-879373-30-0. OCLC 442719108.
- Caraher, Brian G. (2009). "Irish and European politics: nationalism, socialism, empire". In McCourt, John (ed.). James Joyce in Context. Cambridge University Press. pp. 285–298. ISBN 978-0-8018-2543-9. OCLC 1150093431.
- Callanan, Frank (2026). James Joyce: A Political Life. Princeton University Press. ISBN 978-0-6912-2797-9. OCLC 1534116993.
- Cheng, Vincent John (1995). Joyce, Race, and Empire. Cambridge University Press. ISBN 0-521-43118-2. OCLC 1150121186.
- Coolahan, John (2010). "Higher Education, 1908-84". In Hill, J. R. (ed.). A New History of Ireland Volume VII: Ireland, 1921-84. Oxford University Press. pp. 758–759. ISBN 978-0-19-959282-1. OCLC 701552783.
- Cope, Jackson I. (1981). Joyce's Cities: Archaeologies of the Soul. Johns Hopkins University. ISBN 978-0-521-88662-8. OCLC 900420355.
- Costello, Peter (1992). James Joyce: The Years of Growth. Roberts Rineheart. ISBN 1-879373-30-0. OCLC 856717658.
- Cunningham, Valentine (2007). "James Joyce". In Hass, Andrew; Jasper, David; Jay, Elizabeth (eds.). The Oxford Handbook of English Literature and Theology. Oxford University Press. pp. 499–422. ISBN 978-0199271979.
- Davies, Stan Gébler (1982). James Joyce: A Portrait of the Artist. Granada. ISBN 978-0-586-05639-4. OCLC 1194438647.
- Davison, Neil R. (1998). James Joyce, Ulysses, and the Construction of Jewish Identity: Culture, Biography, and 'the Jew' in Modernist Europe. Cambridge University Press. ISBN 978-0-511-58183-0. OCLC 939797702.
- Deane, Seamus (1997). "Joyce the Irishman". In Attridge, Derek (ed.). The Cambridge Companion to James Joyce. Cambridge University Press. pp. 31–53. ISBN 0-521-37673-4. OCLC 1148222842.
- Dettmar, Kevin J. H. (1992). Rereading the New: A Backward Glance at Modernism. University of Michigan Press. ISBN 978-0-586-05639-4. OCLC 1036833691.
- Dowling, Martin (2016). Recollections of James Joyce. Taylor & Francis. ISBN 978-1-317-00841-5. OCLC 953857290.
- Eco, Umberto (1982). The Aesthetics of Chaosmos: The Middle Ages of James Joyce. University of Tulsa. OCLC 644475452.
- Ellmann, Richard (1967). Miller, Liam (ed.). Joyce and Yeats. Dolman Press Yeats Centenary Papers MCMLXV. Vol. XI. Dolmen Press. OCLC 651978436.
- Ellmann, Richard (1977). The Consciousness of Joyce. Oxford University Press. ISBN 978-0-19-502898-0. OCLC 1028560217.
- Ellmann, Richard (1982) [1959]. James Joyce. Oxford University Press. ISBN 978-0-19-503103-4. OCLC 82514111.
- Fairhall, James (1993). James Joyce and the Question of History. Cambridge University Press. ISBN 0-521-40292-1. OCLC 1035904934.
- Fargnoli, A. Nicholas; Gillespie, Michael Patrick (1996). James Joyce A to Z: The Essential Reference to the Life and Work. Oxford University Press. ISBN 0-19-511029-3. OCLC 1200482993.
- Ferris, Kathleen (1995). James Joyce and the Burden of Disease. University of Kentucky. ISBN 978-0-8131-2664-7. OCLC 642824442.
- Fischer, Andreas (2021). James Joyce in Zurich: A Guide. Palgrave Macmillan. ISBN 978-3-030-51282-8. OCLC 1237733430.
- Fogarty, Anne (2014). "Forward". In Brazeau, Gladwin; Gladwin, Derek (eds.). Eco-Joyce: The Environmental Imagination of James Joyce. Cork University Press. pp. xv–xviii. ISBN 978-1-78205-072-8. OCLC 882713144.
- Gabler, Hans Walter (2018). Text Genetics in Literary Modernism and other Essays. Open Book Publishers. ISBN 978-1-78374-365-0. JSTOR j.ctv8j3xd. OCLC 1073823877.
- Gibson, Andrew (2002). Joyce's Revenge: History, Politics, and Aesthetics in Ulysses. Oxford University Press. ISBN 978-0-19-818495-9. OCLC 53971552.
- Gibson, Andrew (2006). James Joyce. Reaktion Books. ISBN 978-1-86189-277-5. OCLC 864255796.
- Groden, Michael (1984). "A Textual and Publishing History". In Bowen, Zack W.; Carens, James F. (eds.). A Companion to Joyce Studies. Greenwood Press. pp. 39–46. ISBN 0-313-22832-9. OCLC 1029292078.
- Hayden, Deborah (2003). Pox: Genius, Madness and the Mysteries of Syphilis. Basic Books. ISBN 0-465-02881-0. OCLC 472849913.
- Henke, Suzzette A. (1991). "Exagmining Beckett & Company". In Dunleavy, Janet Engleson (ed.). Re-viewing Classics of Joyce Criticism. University of Illinois Press. pp. 61–81. ISBN 978-0-252-01774-2. OCLC 463648199.
- Hutchins, Patricia (1950). James Joyce's Dublin. Grey Walls Press. OCLC 753237314.
- Hutchins, Patricia (2016) [1957]. James Joyce's World. Taylor & Francis. ISBN 978-1-317-23035-9. OCLC 1061144722.
- Hodgart, Matthew J. C.; Bauerle, Ruth (1997). Joyce's Grand Operoar: Opera in Finnegans Wake. University of Illinois Press. ISBN 0-252-02258-0. OCLC 1150108253.
- Hughs, Eamonn (1992). "Joyce and Catholicism". In Welch, Robert (ed.). Irish Writers and Religion. Rowman & Littlefield. pp. 116–137. ISBN 978-0-389-20963-8. OCLC 24431101.
- Jackson, John Wyse; Costello, Peter (1998). John Stanislaus Joyce: The Voluminous Life and Genius of James Joyce's Father. St. Martins Press. ISBN 0-312-18599-5. OCLC 1035929915.
- Jackson, John Wyse; McGinley, Bernard (1993). "Afterward: 'Clay'". Dubliners: An Annotated Edition. By James, Joyce. St. Martins Press. ISBN 978-1-85619-120-3. OCLC 1256246736.
- Jung, Carl Gustav (1949). "Ulysses": A monologue [photocopied typescript]. Analytical Psychology Club of New York.
- Jung, Carl Gustav (1975) [1952]. ""Ulysses": A monologue". In Read, Herbert; Fordham, Michael; Adler, Gerhard; McGuire, William (eds.). The Spirit in Man, Art, and Literature. Bollingen Series. Vol. XX. Translated by Hull, R. F. C. Princeton University Press. pp. 117–134. ISBN 0-691-09773-9. OCLC 1245812059.
- Kiberd, Declan (1996). "James Joyce and Mythic Realism". Inventing Ireland. Harvard University Press. pp. 327–358. ISBN 978-0-09-958221-2. OCLC 1035758855.
- Kenny, Colum (2020). The Enigma of Authur Griffith: Father of Us All. Merrion Press. ISBN 978-1-4411-0640-7. OCLC 741691064.
- Lang, Frederick K (1993). "Ulysses" and the Irish God. Lewisburg, London, Toronto: Bucknell University Press, Associated University Presses. ISBN 0-8387-5150-4.
- Latham, Sean (2009). "Twenty-First-Century Critical Contexts". In McCourt, John (ed.). James Joyce in Context. University of Washington Press. pp. 148–160. ISBN 978-0-521-88662-8. OCLC 900420355.
- Lernout, Geertz (2010). Help My Unbelief: James Joyce and Religion. Bloomsbury Publishing. ISBN 978-1-4411-0640-7. OCLC 741691064.
- Lernout, Geertz (1992). The French Joyce. University of Michigan. ISBN 978-0-472-10195-5. OCLC 980940048.
- Litz, Walton A. (1964). The Art of James Joyce: Method and Design in Ulysses and Finnegans Wake. Oxford University Press. OCLC 1147728131.
- Lyons, J. B. (1973). James Joyce and Medicine. Dolmen Press. ISBN 978-0-85105-229-8. OCLC 1194442101.
- MacCabe, Colin (2003). James Joyce and the Revolution of the Word. Palgrave. ISBN 978-0-333-53152-5. OCLC 506235724.
- Maddox, Brenda (1989). Nora: A Biography of Nora Joyce. Fawcett Columbine. ISBN 0-449-90410-5. OCLC 1036769821.
- Manganiello, Daniel (1980). Joyce's Politics. Routledge & Kegan Paul. ISBN 0-7100-0537-7. OCLC 1150084929.
- McCaffrey, Carmel (2006). In Search of Ireland's Heroes: The Story of the Irish from the English Invasion to the Present Day. Ivan R. Dee. ISBN 978-1-56663-615-5. OCLC 1149404907.
- McCourt, John (1999a). James Joyce: A Passionate Exile. Thomas Dunne Books. ISBN 0-312-26941-2. OCLC 566330961.
- McCourt, John (2000). The Years of Bloom: James Joyce in Trieste, 1904–1920. Lilliput Press. ISBN 1-901866-45-9. OCLC 1091015013.
- McCourt, John (2019). "After Ellman: The State of Joyce Biography". In Bradford, Richard (ed.). A Companion to Literary Biography. Wiley Blackwell. pp. 529–546. ISBN 978-1-118-89629-7. OCLC 1060993112.
- Melchiori, Georgio (1984a). "Introduction". In Melchiori, Giorgio (ed.). Joyce in Rome: The Genesis of Ulysses (PDF). Bulzone Editore. pp. 9–13. Archived from the original (PDF) on 9 February 2021.
- Melchiori, Georgio (1984b). "The Genesis of Ulysses". In Melchiori, Giorgio (ed.). Joyce in Rome: The Genesis of Ulysses (PDF). Bulzone Editore. pp. 37–50. Archived from the original (PDF) on 9 February 2021.
- Morse, J. Mitchell (1959). The Sympathetic Alien: James Joyce and Catholicism. New York University Press. OCLC 1151344010.
- Nolan, Emer (1995). James Joyce and Nationalism. ISBN 0-203-21312-2. OCLC 956639381.
- Noon, Thomas (1963) [1957]. Joyce and Aquinas. Yale University Press. OCLC 1150130940.
- O'Brien, Edna (2000) [2011]. James Joyce. Phoenix. ISBN 978-0-7538-1070-5. OCLC 1194438672.
- O'Callaghan, Katherine (2020). "The Art of Reading a Musical Novel: Literary Audiation and the Case of James Joyce". In van Hulle, Dirk; Silva, Emma-Louise; Slote, Sam (eds.). James Joyce and the Arts. Brill. ISBN 978-90-04-42619-1. OCLC 1247076920.
- * O'Connor, Ulick (1970). "Joyce and Gogarty". In Ryan, John (ed.). A Bash in the Tunnel: James Joyce by the Irish. Clifton Books. ISBN 978-0-901255-19-8. OCLC 964128395.
- Onorati, Franco (1984). "Bank Clerk in Rome". In Melchiori, Giorgio (ed.). Joyce in Rome: The Genesis of Ulysses (PDF). Bulzone Editore. pp. 24–31. Archived from the original (PDF) on 9 February 2021.
- Orr, Leonard (2008). "From High-Modern Aesthete to Postcolonial Subject: An Introduction to the Political Transformation of Joyce Studies". In Orr, Leonard (ed.). Joyce, Imperialism, Postcolonialism. Syracuse University Press. pp. 1–11. ISBN 978-0-8156-3188-0. OCLC 1244720169.
- Osteen, Mark (1995a). The Economy of Ulysses: Making Both Ends Meet. Syracuse University Press. ISBN 978-0-8156-2653-4. OCLC 1035657242.
- Potts, Willard (1979). "August Suter". In Potts, Willard (ed.). Portraits of the Artist in Exile: Recollections of James Joyce by Europeans. University of Washington Press. pp. 59–60. ISBN 0-295-95614-3. OCLC 1256510754.
- Rabaté, Jean-Michel (2001). James Joyce and the Politics of Egoism. Cambridge University Press. ISBN 978-0-521-00958-4. OCLC 1159835557.
- Riquelme, John Paul (1983). Teller and Tale in Joyce's Fictions: Oscillating Perspectives. Johns Hopkins University. ISBN 978-0-8018-2854-6. OCLC 803667971.
- Scholes, Robert E. (1992). In Search of James Joyce. University of Illinois Press. ISBN 978-0-252-06245-2. OCLC 1035657242.
- Segall, Jeffrey (1993). Joyce in America: Cultural Politics and the Trials of Ulysses. University of California Press. ISBN 978-0-520-91235-9. OCLC 45731264.
- Seidel, Michael (2008). James Joyce: A Short Introduction. John Wiley & Sons. ISBN 978-0-470-69290-5. OCLC 437218520.
- Sherry, Vincent B. (2004). James Joyce: Ulysses, A Student Guide. Cambridge University Press. ISBN 978-1-283-32913-2. OCLC 80247307.
- Shloss, Carol Loeb (2005). Lucia Joyce: To Dance in the Wake. Picador. ISBN 0-312-42269-5. OCLC 1150291846.
- Shockley, Alan (2009). "Playing the Square Circle: Musical Form and Polyphony in the Wake". In Friedman, Alan W.; Rossman, Charles (eds.). De-Familiarizing Readings: Essays from the Austin Joyce Conference. European Joyce Studies. Vol. 18. Amsterdam: Editions Rodopi. pp. 101–102. ISBN 978-90-420-2570-7. OCLC 907184947.
- Sollers, Phillippe (1978). "Joyce & Co.". In Hayman, David; Anderson, Elliott (eds.). In the Wake of the Wake. University of Wisconsin Press. pp. 107–122. ISBN 978-0-299-07600-9. OCLC 1150051810.
- Spender, Stephen (1970). "Stephen Spender, in Listener 1941". In Deming, Robert H. (ed.). James Joyce: The Critical Heritage. Vol. 2: 1928–1941. Barnes & Noble. ISBN 978-0-389-01023-4. OCLC 75268.
- Strong, L. A. G. (1949). The Sacred River: An Approach to James Joyce. Methuen. OCLC 1151157933.
- Sullivan, Kevin (1958). Joyce among the Jesuits. Columbia University Press. OCLC 1035932848.
- Sultan, Stanley (1987). Eliot, Joyce, and Company. Oxford University Press. ISBN 978-0-19-802156-8. OCLC 191953301.
- Vanderham, Paul (1997). James Joyce and Censorship: The Trials of Ulysses. New York University Press. ISBN 978-0-8147-8790-8. OCLC 1090993728.
- Van Mierlo, Chrissie (2017). James Joyce and Catholicism: The Apostate's Wake. Bloomsbury Publishing. ISBN 978-1-4725-8596-7. OCLC 1100839903.
- Watson, G. J. (1987). "The Politics of Ulysses". In Newman, Robert D.; Thornton, Weldon (eds.). Joyce's Ulysses: The Larger Perspective. University of Delaware Press. pp. 39–58. ISBN 978-0-87413-316-5. OCLC 1150083137.
- White, Tony (2001). Investing in People: Higher Education in Ireland from 1960 to 2000. Institute of Public Administration. ISBN 1-902448-55-3. OCLC 1153619624.
- Witen, Michelle (2018). James Joyce and Absolute Music. Bloomsbury. ISBN 978-1-350-01423-7. OCLC 1038573672.

=== Journal articles ===
- Attridge, Derek (2013). "Finnegans awake: The dream of interpretation". James Joyce Quarterly. 50 (1/2): 185–202. doi:10.1353/jjq.2012.0072. JSTOR 24598778. S2CID 170426109.
- Benstock, Bernard (1961). "The Final Apostacy: James Joyce and Finnegans Wake". ELH. 28 (4): 417–437. doi:10.2307/2871822. JSTOR 2871822.
- Berrone, Louis; Joyce, James (1976). "Two James Joyce essays unveiled: "The Centenary of Charles Dickens" and "L'influenza letteraria universale del rinascimento"". Journal of Modern Literature. 5 (1): 3–18. JSTOR 3830952.
- Bollettieri Bosinelli, Rosa Maria (2013). "Riders to the Sea/La Cavalcata al Mare by John Millington Synge, translated by James Joyce and Nicolò Vidacovich [Review]". James Joyce Quarterly. 50 (4): 1114–1118. doi:10.1353/jjq.2013.0072. JSTOR 24598738. S2CID 161160149.
- Borach, Georges (1954) [1931]. "Conversations with James Joyce". College English. 15 (6): 325–327. doi:10.2307/371650. JSTOR 371650.
- Bowker, Gordon (2011). "Joyce in England". James Joyce Quarterly. 48 (4): 667–681. doi:10.1353/jjq.2011.0093. JSTOR 24598884. S2CID 162310457.
- Briggs, Austin (2011). "Joyce's drinking". James Joyce Quarterly. 48 (4): 637–666. doi:10.1353/jjq.2011.0096. JSTOR 24598883. S2CID 162042715.
- Brivic, Sheldon R. (1968). "Structure and meaning in Joyce's Exiles". James Joyce Quarterly. 6 (1): 29–52. JSTOR 25486737.
- Carver, Craig (1978). "James Joyce and the theory of magic". James Joyce Quarterly. 15 (3): 201–214. JSTOR 25476132.
- Chun, Eunkyung (2015). "Finnegans Wake: A postmodern vision of world literature". Journal of Irish Studies. 30: 71–76. JSTOR 43737511.
- Clark, John Earl (1968). "James Joyce's Exiles". James Joyce Quarterly. 6 (1): 69–78. JSTOR 25486739.
- Crise, Stelio; Rocco-Bergera, Niny; Dalton, Jack P. (1969). "Ahab, pizdrool, quark". James Joyce Quarterly. 7 (1): 65–69. JSTOR 25486807.
- Dalton, Jack P. (1968). "A letter from T. S. Eliot". James Joyce Quarterly. 6 (1): 79–81. JSTOR 25486740.
- Davison, Neil R. (1994). "Joyce's homosocial reckoning: Italo Svevo, aesthetics, and A Portrait of the Artist as a Young Man". Modern Language Studies. 24 (3): 69–92. doi:10.2307/3194849. JSTOR 3194849.
- Dilks, Stephen John (2004). "Selling Work in Progress". James Joyce Quarterly. 41 (4): 719–744. JSTOR 25478104.
- Downes, Gareth Joseph (2003). "The heretical Auctoritas of Giordano Bruno: The significance of the brunonian presence in James Joyce's "The Day of the Rabblement" and Stephen Hero". Joyce Studies Annual. 14: 37–73. doi:10.1353/joy.2004.0003 (inactive 4 January 2026). JSTOR 26285203. S2CID 162878408.
- Doyle, Paul A. (1965). "Joyce's Miscellaneous Verse". James Joyce Quarterly. 2 (2): 90–96. JSTOR 25486486.
- Ellmann, Richard (1950). "Joyce and Yeats". Kenyon Review. 12 (1): 618–638. JSTOR 4333187.
- Ellmann, Richard (1958). "The Backgrounds of 'The Dead'". The Kenyon Review. 20 (4): 507–528. JSTOR 4333899.
- Emerson, Kent (2017). "Joyce's Ulysses: A database narrative". Joyce Studies Annual: 40–64. JSTOR 26798610.
- Fahy, Catherine (1993). "The James Joyce/Paul Léon Papers in the National Library of Ireland: Observations on their cataloguing and research potential". Joyce Studies Annual. 4 (4): 3–15. JSTOR 26283682.
- Fludernik, Monika (1986). ""Ulysses" and Joyce's change of artistic aims: external and internal evidence". James Joyce Quarterly. 23 (2): 173–186. JSTOR 25476719.
- Froula, Christine (1990). "History's nightmare, fiction's dream: Joyce and the psychohistory of Ulysses". Papers from the Joyce and History Conference at Yale, October 1990, Pp. 857–872. 28 (4): 857–872. JSTOR 25485215.
- Gabler, Hans Walter (1974). "Toward a critical text of James Joyce's Portrait of the Artist as a Young Man". Studies in Bibliography. 27: 1–53. JSTOR 40371587.
- Gerber, Richard J. (2010). ""James Joyce: A Concert of Music" by George Antheil, Othmar Schoeck, Mátyás Gyorgy Seiber, performed by the American Symphony Orchestra, conducted by Leon Botstein, with Collegiate Chorale Singers". James Joyce Quarterly. 47 (3): 478–484. doi:10.1353/jjq.2011.0016. JSTOR 23048756. S2CID 162186078.
- Grandt, Jürgen E. (2003). "Might be what you like, till you hear the words": Joyce in Zurich and the contrapuntal language of Ulysses". Joyce Studies Annual. 14: 74–91. doi:10.1353/joy.2004.0005 (inactive 4 January 2026). JSTOR 26285204. S2CID 153695047.
- del Greco Lobner, Corinna (1985). "James Joyce and Italian Futurism". Irish University Review. 15 (1): 73–92. JSTOR 25477575.
- Groden, Michael (2007). "Joyce at work on "Cyclops": Toward a biography of "Ulysses"". James Joyce Quarterly. 44 (2): 217–245. doi:10.1353/jjq.2007.0035. JSTOR 25571018. S2CID 162357164.
- Halper, Nathan (1979). "The life chronology of Dubliners (II)". James Joyce Quarterly. 16 (4): 473–477. JSTOR 25476225.
- Harrington, Judith (1998). "Eighteen way of seeing Joyce's Paris". James Joyce Quarterly. 36 (1): 841–849. JSTOR 25473958.
- Hederman, Mark Patrick (1982). "James Joyce, priest and poet". The Crane Bag. 6 (1): 20–30. JSTOR 30059526.
- Hegglund, Jon (2003). "Ulysses and the Rhetoric of Cartography". Twentieth Century Literature. 49 (2): 164–192. doi:10.2307/3176000. JSTOR 3176000.
- Hibbert, Jeffrey (2011). "Joyce's loss of faith". Journal of Modern Literature. 34 (2): 196–203. doi:10.2979/jmodelite.34.2.196. JSTOR 10.2979/jmodelite.34.2.196. S2CID 162597336.
- Humphreys, Susan L. (1979). "Ferrero Etc: James Joyce's Debt to Guglielmo Ferrero". James Joyce Quarterly. 16 (3): 239–251. JSTOR 25476189.
- Hutton, Clare (2003). "Chapters of moral history: Failing to publish Dubliners". James Joyce Quarterly. 97 (4): 495–519. JSTOR 24295682.
- Kelly, Joseph (1993). "Pound's Joyce". James Joyce Literary Supplement. 7 (1): 21–23. JSTOR 26635100.
- Kelly, Joseph (2011). "Joyce's exile: The prodigal son". Innovative Fiction. 48 (4): 603–635. doi:10.1353/jjq.2011.0075. JSTOR 24598882. S2CID 154371272.
- Kimpel, Ben D. (1975). "Joyce's exile: The voice of Ulysses". James Joyce Quarterly. 9 (3): 283–319. JSTOR 45108722.
- Kumar, Shiv K. (1957). "Space-time polarity in Finnegans Wake". Modern Philology. 53 (4): 230–233. doi:10.1086/389169. JSTOR 434978. S2CID 162207656.
- Levitt, Morton P. (2006). "Beyond Dublin: Joyce and Modernism". Journal of Modern Literature. 22 (2): 385–394. JSTOR 3831743.
- Livak, Leonid (Summer 2012). "A Thankless Occupation: James Joyce and his Translator Ludmila Savitzky" (PDF). Toronto Slavic Quarterly (41). Archived from the original (PDF) on 26 March 2021.
- Loukopoulou, Eleni (2011). "Joyce's progress through London: Conquering the English publishing market". James Joyce Quarterly. 48 (4): 683–710. doi:10.1353/jjq.2011.0089. JSTOR 24598885. S2CID 162194997.
- Loukopoulou, Eleni (2025). "James Joyce's Portrait in London's Greek Newspaper Hē Hesperia (1916–20)". Journal of European Periodical Studies. 9 (2): 91–107. doi:10.21825/jeps.90007.
- Lyons, J. B. (2000). "James Joyce: Steps towards a diagnosis". Journal of the History of the Neurosciences. 9 (3): 294–306. doi:10.1076/0964-704x(200012)9:3;1-#;ft294. PMID 11232371.
- Mahon, John W. (2004). "Joyce among the brothers". Christianity and Literature. 53 (3): 349–359. doi:10.1177/014833310405300304. JSTOR 44313324.
- Mamigonian, Marc A.; Turner, John Noel (2003). "Annotations for Stephen Hero". James Joyce Quarterly. 40 (3): 347–505, 507–518. JSTOR 25477965.
- Manglaviti, Leo M. (2000). "Sticking to the Jesuits: A revisit to Belvedere House". James Joyce Quarterly. 37 (1/2): 214–224. JSTOR 25474127.
- Martin, Timothy; Bauerle, Ruth (1990). "The voice from the prompt vox: Otto Luening remembers James Joyce in Zurich". Journal of Modern Literature. 17 (1): 34–48. JSTOR 3831401.
- Mason, Ellsworth (1956). "James Joyce's shrill note. The Piccolo della Seraarticles". Twentieth Century Literature. 2 (3): 115–139. doi:10.2307/440499. JSTOR 440499.
- McCourt, John (1999b). "James Joyce: Triestine Futurist?". James Joyce Quarterly. 36 (2): 85–105. JSTOR 25473995.
- Medina Casado, Carmelo (2000). "Sifting through Censorship: The British Home Office Ulysses Files (1922–1936)". James Joyce Quarterly. 37 (3/4): 479–508. JSTOR 25477754.
- Monnier, Adrienne (1946). "Joyce's Ulysses and the French public". Kenyon Review. 8 (3). Translated by Beach, Sylvia: 430–444. JSTOR 4332775.
- Maitra, Dipanjan (2016). "Of Contorted Politics: A Note on the VIII.A Notebooks of 1916". Genetic Joyce Studies (16): 1–10. ISSN 2031-9002.
- Nadel, Ira B. (1986). "Joyce and the Jews". Modern Judaism. 6 (3): 301–302. doi:10.1093/mj/6.3.301. JSTOR 1396219.
- Nadel, Ira B. (1989). "Joyce and Expressionism". Journal of Modern Literature. 16 (1): 141–160. JSTOR 3831378.
- Nadel, Ira B. (1990). "Anthologizing Joyce: the example of T. S. Eliot". James Joyce Quarterly. 27 (3): 509–515. JSTOR 25485058.
- Nadel, Ira B. (1991). "The incomplete joyce". Joyce Studies Annual. 2: 86–100. JSTOR 26283639.
- Nadel, Ira B. (2008). "Travesties: Tom Stoppard's Joyce and other Dadaist fantasies, or history in a hat". James Joyce Quarterly. 45 (3/4): 481–492. doi:10.1353/jjq.0.0086. JSTOR 30244390. S2CID 161243903.
- Osteen, Mark (1995b). ""A Splendid Bazaar": The shopper's guide to the New Dubliners" (PDF). Studies in Short Fiction. 32: 483–496. Archived from the original (PDF) on 22 September 2021 – via markosteen.files.wordpress.com.
- Pelaschiar, Laura (1999). "Stanislaus Joyce's Book of Days: The Triestine Diary". James Joyce Quarterly. 36 (2): 61–71. JSTOR 25473993.
- Petroski, Henry (1974). "What are pomes?". Journal of Modern Literature. 3 (4): 1021–1026. JSTOR 3830909.
- Platt, Len (2008). "Madame Blavatsky and theosophy in Finnegans Wake: An Annotated List" (PDF). James Joyce Quarterly. 45 (2): 281–300. doi:10.1353/jjq.0.0057. JSTOR 30244358. S2CID 162009870. Archived (PDF) from the original on 16 September 2019.
- Prescott, Joseph (1954). "James Joyce's Stephen Hero". The Journal of English and Germanic Philology. 53 (2): 214–223. JSTOR 27713665.
- Quillian, William H. (1974). "Shakespeare in Trieste: Joyce's 1912 'Hamlet' Lectures". James Joyce Quarterly. 12 (1/2): 7–63. JSTOR 25487170.
- Rabaté, Jean-Michele (1989). "Bruno no, Bruno ii: Note on a contradiction in Joyce". James Joyce Quarterly. 27 (1): 31–39. JSTOR 25485004.
- Rainey, Lawrence (1996). "Consuming investments: James Joyce's Ulysses". James Joyce Quarterly. 33 (4): 531–567. JSTOR 25473767.
- Rando, David P. (2016). "The future of Joyce's A Portrait: The Künstlerroman and hope". Dublin James Joyce Journal. 9: 47–67. doi:10.1353/djj.2016.0003. S2CID 29727253. Archived from the original on 7 March 2020.
- Robinson, Richard (2001). "A stranger in the House of Habsburg: Joyce's ramshackle empire". James Joyce Quarterly. 38 (3/4): 321–339. JSTOR 25477811.
- Rocco-Bergera, Ninny (1972). "James Joyce and Trieste". James Joyce Quarterly. 9 (3): 342–349. JSTOR 25486995.
- Ruff, Lillian M. (1969). "James Joyce and Arnold Dolmetsch". James Joyce Quarterly. 6 (3): 224–230. JSTOR 25486770.
- Rushing, Conrad (2000). "The English Players Incident: What really happened?". James Joyce Quarterly. 37 (3/4): 371–388. JSTOR 25477748.
- Schneider, Erik (2001). ""A Grievious Distemper": Joyce and the Rheumatic Fever Episode". James Joyce Quarterly. 38 (3/4): 453–475. JSTOR 25477818.
- Schork, R. J (1999). "James Joyce and the Eastern Orthodox Church". Journal of Modern Greek Studies. 17 (1): 107–124. doi:10.1353/mgs.1999.0018. ISSN 1086-3265.
- Schotter, Jesse (2010). "Verbivocovisuals: James Joyce and the Problem of Babel". James Joyce Quarterly. 48 (1): 89–109. doi:10.1353/jjq.2010.0045. JSTOR 41429838. S2CID 154293772.
- Sicker, Philip (2006). "Evenings at the Volta: Cinematic afterimiages in Joyce". Italica. 42/43 (1/4): 334–338. JSTOR 25570961. Archived from the original on 2 January 2026.
- Spielberg, Peter (1964). "Take a shaggy dog by the tale". James Joyce Quarterly. 1 (3): 42–44. JSTOR 25486441.
- Spoo, Robert (1986). ""Nestor" and the Nightmare: The presence of the Great War in Ulysses". Journal of Modern Literature. 14 (4): 481–497. JSTOR 3831561.
- Spoo, Robert (1988). "Joyce's Attitudes toward History: Rome, 1906–07". Twentieth Century Literature. 32 (2): 137–154. doi:10.2307/441379. JSTOR 441379. Archived from the original on 2 January 2026.
- de Sola Rodstein, Susan (1998). "Back to 1904: Joyce, Ireland, and nationalism". European Joyce Studies. 8: 145–185. JSTOR 44871195.
- Staley, Thomas F. (1963). "James Joyce and Italo Svevo". Italica. 40 (4): 334–338. doi:10.2307/476822. JSTOR 476822. Archived from the original on 2 January 2026.
- Staley, Thomas F. (1964). "The Search for Leopold Bloom: James Joyce and Italo Svevo". James Joyce Quarterly. 1 (4): 59–63. JSTOR 25486462.
- Stanzel, Frank K. (2001). "Austria's Surveillance of Joyce in Pola, Trieste, and Zurich". James Joyce Quarterly. 38 (3/4): 361–371. JSTOR 25477813.
- Steppe, Wolfhard (1995). "The Merry Greeks (With a Farewell to "epicleti")". James Joyce Quarterly. 32 (3/4): 597–617. ISSN 0021-4183.
- Sultan, Stanley (2000). "Joyceday". Joyce Studies Annual. 11: 27–48. JSTOR 26285213.
- Thompson, William Irwin (1964). "The language of Finnegans Wake". Sewanee Review. 72 (1): 78–90. JSTOR 27540957.
- Walkiewicz, E. P. (1982). "Joyce/Pound: Dublin '82". Paideuma: Modern and Contemporary Poetry and Poetics. 11 (3): 511–517. JSTOR 24725366.
- Walzl, Florence L. (1977). "The life chronology of Dubliners". James Joyce Quarterly. 14 (4): 408–415. JSTOR 25476081.
- Weir, David (2000). "What did he know and when did he know it: The Little Review,, Joyce, and Ulysses". James Joyce Quarterly. 37 (3/4): 389–412. JSTOR 25477749.
- Weisenfarth, Joseph (1991). "Fargobawlers: James Joyce and Ford Madox Ford". James Joyce Quarterly. 14 (2): 95–116. JSTOR 23539891.
- Witemeyer, Hugh (1995). ""He gave the name": Herbert Gorman's rectifications of James Joyce: His First Forty Years". James Joyce Quarterly. 32 (3/4): 523–532. JSTOR 25473660.
- Wykes, David (1968). "The Odyssey in Ulysses". Texas Studies in Literature and Language. 10 (2): 301–316. JSTOR 40753991.
- Zanotti, Serenella (2001). "An Italianate Irishman: Joyce and the Languages of Trieste". James Joyce Quarterly. 38 (3/4): 411–430. JSTOR 25477816.

=== Online sources ===
- Nastasi, Alison (2014). "10 Authors on James Joyce". Flavorwire. Archived from the original on 6 August 2020.
- "50 Writers Talk About James Joyce". Three Monkeys Online. n.d. Archived from the original on 21 October 2014.
- "11 – 19 Oct 1904 & June/July 1915". Zürich James Joyce Foundation. n.d. Archived from the original on 18 April 2017.
- Ellmann, Richard (2 February 1982b). "Joyce's Religion and Politics". Irish Times Supplement.
- "Exhibitions at MoLI". Museum of Literature Ireland. n.d. Archived from the original on 15 August 2021.
- "History of the Feis Ceoil Association". Feis Ceoil Association. n.d. Archived from the original on 1 April 2007.
- Hawley, Martha (producer); McCourt, John (2000). "James Joyce in Trieste". Radio Netherlands Worldwide (Podcast). Archived from the original on 2 January 2026.
- Horgan-Jones, Jack (14 October 2019). "James Joyce: Return writer's remains to Ireland, say Dublin councillors". The Irish Times. Archived from the original on 28 October 2019.
- Groden, Michael (n.d.). "Characters in Dubliners who reappear in Ulysses". Michael Groden: Notes on James Joyce's Ulysses. The University of Western Ontario. Archived from the original on 1 November 2005.
- Harnett, Rob (2019). "MoLI Makes weekend radio debut". Entertainment for business. Archived from the original on 16 May 2021.
- "The Irish Times view on James Joyce's remains: leave him be". The Irish Times. 26 October 2019. Archived from the original on 29 October 2019.
- "On this day ... 17 February". James Joyce Centre. 17 February 2014. Archived from the original on 24 April 2014.
- Jordan, Anthony (20 February 2012). "An Irishman's Diary". The Irish Times. Archived from the original on 28 February 2012.
- Jordan, Anthony (13 January 2018). "Remembering James Joyce, 77 years to the day after his death". The Irish Times. Archived from the original on 3 March 2020.
- Killeen, Terence (7 May 2012). "Joycean joy after library says 'yes'". The Irish Times. Archived from the original on 20 June 2016.
- Murphy, James S. (2014). "Bloomsday is a Travesty, but Not for the Reason You Think". Vanity Fair. Archived from the original on 19 December 2015.
- Mullin, Katherine (2014). "An Introduction to Ulysses". Discovering Literature: 20th Century. British Library. Archived from the original on 24 July 2016.
- "Prezioso Roberto – Joyce Museum". museojoycetrieste.it (in Italian).
- "Newman House, 86 St. Stephen's Green, Dublin 2, Dublin". National Inventory of Architectural Heritage. n.d. Archived from the original on 26 October 2021.
- Parsons, Michael (16 June 2014). "Michael Flatley confirms he owns medal won by James Joyce". The Irish Times. Archived from the original on 16 June 2014.
- "Pomes Penyeach by James Joyce". Collection Items. British Library. Archived from the original on 30 October 2021.
- "Residents of a house 8.1 in Royal Terrace (Clontarf West, Dublin)[1901 Census]". National Archives of Ireland. n.d. Archived from the original on 6 June 2010.
- "Song and Music in the Works of James Joyce". Music in the Works of James Joyce. n.d.
- UCL (2016). "James Joyce Collection". Library Services. Archived from the original on 15 December 2023.

Primary sources

- Anderson, Margaret (n.d.) [1921]. "Ulysses in Court (Little Review, January to March, 1921)". Famous Trials by Professor Douglas O. Linter. Archived from the original on 25 March 2021.
- Beach, Sylvia (1959). Shakespeare and Company. Shakespeare and Company. OCLC 1036948998.
- Budgen, Frank (1950) [1934]. James Joyce and the Making of Ulysses. Indiana University Press. OCLC 1035899317.
- Colum, Mary (1947). Life and the Dream. Doubleday & Co. OCLC 459369404.
- Delimata, Bozena Berta (1981). Moseley, Virginia (ed.). "Reminiscences of a Joyce Niece". James Joyce Quarterly. 19 (1): 408–415. JSTOR 25476405.
- Francini Bruni, Alessandro (1979) [1922]. "Joyce Stripped Naked in the Piazza". In Potts, Willard (ed.). Portraits of the Artist in Exile: Recollections of James Joyce by Europeans. University of Washington Press. pp. 7–38. ISBN 0-295-95614-3. OCLC 1256510754.
- Francini Bruni, Alessandro (1979) [1947]. "Recollections of Joyce". In Potts, Willard (ed.). Portraits of the Artist in Exile: Recollections of James Joyce by Europeans. University of Washington Press. pp. 39–46. ISBN 0-295-95614-3. OCLC 1256510754.
- Frank, Nino (1979) [1926]. "The Shadow That Had Lost Its Man". In Potts, Willard (ed.). Portraits of the Artist in Exile: Recollections of James Joyce by Europeans. University of Washington Press. pp. 74–105. ISBN 0-295-95614-3. OCLC 1256510754.
- Gogarty, Oliver St. John (1990) [1948]. "James Joyce: A Portrait of the Artist". In Mikhail, E. H. (ed.). James Joyce: Interviews and Recollections. Palgrave MacMillian. pp. 21–31. ISBN 978-1-349-09422-6. OCLC 1004381330.
- Gorman, Herbert Sherman (1948) [1939]. James Joyce. Rinehart. OCLC 1035888158. Gorman's biography was substantially edited by Joyce; see Nadel, 1991 and Witemeyer, 1995 cited above.
- Joyce, James (1901). "The Day of the Rabblement". Two essays: "A Forgotten Aspect of the University Question" by F. J. C. Skeffington and "The Day of the Rabblement by James A. Joyce. Gerrard Brothers. OCLC 1158075403.
- Joyce, James (1957). Gilbert, Stuart (ed.). Letters of James Joyce. Viking Press. OCLC 1035911799.
- Joyce, James (1966a). Ellmann, Richard (ed.). Letters of James Joyce. Vol. II. Faber and Faber. OCLC 1150247200.
- Joyce, James (1966b). Ellmann, Richard (ed.). Letters of James Joyce. Vol. III. Faber and Faber. OCLC 1035895293.
- Joyce, Stanislaus (1962) [1905b]. Dublin Diary. Cornell University Press. OCLC 18622314.
- Joyce, Stanislaus (1950) [1941]. "James Joyce: A Memoir". Hudson Review. 2 (4). Translated by Giovanelli, Felix: 485–514. doi:10.2307/3847704. JSTOR 3847704.
- Joyce, Stanislaus (1950). Recollections of James Joyce. James Joyce Society. OCLC 56703249.
- Joyce, Stanislaus (1958). My Brother's Keeper: James Joyce's Early Years. Viking Press. OCLC 1036750861.
- Joyce Schaurek, Eileen (1990) [1963]. "Pappy never spoke of Jim's books". In Mikhail, E. H. (ed.). James Joyce: Interviews and Recollections. Palgrave MacMillian. pp. 60–68. ISBN 978-1-349-09422-6. OCLC 1004381330.
- Larbaud, Valery (1922). "James Joyce" (PDF). Nouvelle Revue Française (in French) (103): 385–409. Archived from the original (PDF) on 6 October 2022.
- Luening, Otto (1980). Odyssey of an American Composer: The Autobiography of Otto Luening. Charles Scribner's Sons. ISBN 0-684-16496-5. OCLC 1236060136.
- Pound, Ezra Loomis (1967). Forrest, Read (ed.). Pound/Joyce: The Letters of Ezra Pound to James Joyce, with Pound's Essays on Joyce. New Directions. OCLC 1036797049.
- Quinn, John (2014) [24 February 1917]. "James Joyce, a new Irish novelist". Vanity Fair. Archived from the original on 12 April 2015.
- Suter, August (1979) [1926]. "The Shadow That Had Lost Its Man". In Potts, Willard (ed.). Portraits of the Artist in Exile: Recollections of James Joyce by Europeans. University of Washington Press. pp. 61–69. ISBN 0-295-95614-3. OCLC 1256510754.
- Svevo, Italo (1950) [1927]. James Joyce. City Lights Books. OCLC 1150089957.
- Zweig, Stephen (1964) [1941]. The World of Yesterday: An Autobiography. University of Nebraska Press. OCLC 978106414.

Literary works

- Joyce, James (1965) [1904]. "A Portrait of the Artist". In Scholes, Robert; Kain, Richard M. (eds.). The Workshop of Daedalus: James Joyce and the Raw Materials for A Portrait of the Artist as a Young Man. OCLC 763117800.
- Joyce, James (1904b). "The Holy Office". ricorso.net. Archived from the original on 10 December 2018.
- Joyce, James (1916b). Portrait of the Artist as a Young Man. B. W. Huebsch. OCLC 1050861001.
- Joyce, James (1922). Ulysses. The Egoist Press. OCLC 1158083156.
- Joyce, James (1990) [1939]. Szeliga, Tim; Theall, Donald (eds.). "Text of Finnegans Wake at Trent University, Peterborough, Ontario". Trent University. Archived from the original on 7 June 2011.
- Joyce, James (1989) [1959]. Mason, Ellsworth; Ellmann, Richard (eds.). The Critical Writings of James Joyce. Cornell University Press. ISBN 0-8014-9587-3. OCLC 756438802.
- Yeats, William Butler (1912) [1892]. "To Ireland in the Coming Times". Poems. T. Fisher Unwin. pp. 153–155. OCLC 1158571002.
