= Vincent Cheng =

Vincent Cheng may refer to:

- Vincent Cheng Hoi-Chuen (1948–2022), former chairman of The Hongkong and Shanghai Banking Corporation
- Vincent John Cheng, academic
- Vincent Cheng Kim Chuan, Singaporean Catholic social worker and dissent
- Vincent Cheng Wing-shun (born 1979), Hong Kong District Councillor
