= Stubbs' Gazette =

Irish publication detailing bankruptcies, insolvencies and judgements

Stubbs' Gazette is a publication that provides details of insolvencies and court actions taken against businesses and individuals in Ireland and Northern Ireland. First published in 1828, Stubbs' Gazette has been published continuously since 1836.

The events listed in the gazette include the administration of a company, its liquidation or similar. The publication also lists personal bankruptcies and sequestrations amongst other events. The name and address of debtors are listed along with the amounts of money involved in court actions.

The gazette is published weekly in the Republic of Ireland. In Northern Ireland it is published fortnightly. The gazette is available in PDF on Mondays and on paper on Fridays. Additionally, the publication maintains a searchable digital database. The publication is subscribed to by insolvency agencies and lawyers, debt and property management companies, credit and financial agencies, as well as local authorities, and others.

In the 2010s the gazette entered the debt recovery business, sending letters to debtors threatening legal action and the publication of their debts in the gazette.
