= Vincent John Cheng =

Vincent John Cheng (born 1951) is an literary academic, best known for his James Joyce, postcolonial theory, and race studies.

Cheng was raised in several countries. Including his native Taiwan, he also lived in Mexico, Brazil, Canada, Swaziland, and the United States. Cheng attended Harvard University from 1969 to 1973, earning a Bachelor of Arts, then completed his Master's of Arts at Boston University in 1974, followed by a PhD at Stanford University in 1979. He immediately joined the University of Southern California as an assistant professor, advancing to associate professor in 1985, and full professor in 1993.

Cheng started teaching at the University of Utah in 1999, as the Shirley Sutton Thomas Professor of English, and was named to a distinguished professorship in 2019.

== Books ==
- Shakespeare and Joyce: A Study of Finnegans Wake, Pennsylvania State University Press (1984)
- tr., Le Cid: A Translation in Rhymed Couplets, University of Delaware Press (1987)
- ed., with Timothy Martin. Joyce in Context, Cambridge University Press (1992)
- Joyce, Race and Empire, Cultural Margins No. 3, Cambridge University Press (1995)
- ed., with Margot Norris and Kimberly J. Devlin. Joycean Cultures/Culturing Joyces, University of Delaware Press (1998)
- Inauthentic: The Anxiety Over Culture and Identity, Rutgers University Press (2004)
- James Joyce, Race, and Colonialism, National Library of Ireland (2004)
- Amnesia and the Nation: History, Forgetting, and James Joyce, Palgrave Macmillan (2018)
