= The Sisters (short story) =

- Short story by James Joyce
- Country: Ireland
- Language: English
- Genre: short story

Publication
- Published in: Dubliners
- Publication type: Collection
- Media type: Print
- Publication date: 1914

Chronology
—	An Encounter

"The Sisters" is a short story by James Joyce, the first of a series of short stories called Dubliners. Originally published in the Irish Homestead on 13 August 1904, "The Sisters" was Joyce's first published work of fiction. Joyce later revised the story and had it, along with the rest of the series, published in book form in 1914. The story details a boy's connection with a local priest, in the context of the priest's death and reputation.

== Major characters ==
- The boy (narrator)
- James Flynn, retired priest
- Eliza Flynn, sister of James Flynn
- Nannie Flynn, sister of James Flynn
- Old Cotter
- Aunt of the boy
- Uncle of the boy

== Summary ==
Narrated in the first person, "The Sisters" deals with the death of a priest, Father James Flynn, who had a close association with a young boy. The story opens with the boy, who knows that the priest's death is imminent, outside the priest's home, repeating the word "paralysis" while looking up at the bedroom window for the sign that will tell him Flynn has died. When he returns home, a family friend is disparaging the priest, then informs the boy of the priest's death and proceeds to disparage their relationship. That night the boy dreams of the "paralytic" and, as the dream continues, he remembers the priest has died of "paralysis". The next day he finds himself unable to mourn, feeling instead that he has been freed. He is surprised and remembers that the priest instructed him in numerous subjects, especially the traditions of the Catholic Church. That evening he and his aunt visit the priest's home, where they are met by his sisters, Eliza and Nannie. After viewing the priest's corpse in the bedroom upstairs, they sit downstairs with the sisters while Eliza recounts the priest's decline. She says the duties of the priesthood had overwhelmed him, that he dropped a chalice, which broke, and afterwards was found in his confession-box laughing to himself.

== Evolution of the story ==
In summer of 1904, George Russell of the editorial department of the weekly paper The Irish Homestead wrote Joyce a letter in regards to a section of the journal called "Our Weekly Story":

Dear Joyce,

Look at the story in this paper The Irish Homestead. Could you write anything simple, rural?, livemaking?, pathos?, which could be inserted so as not to shock the readers. If you could furnish a short story about 1800 words suitable for insertion the editor will pay £1. It is easily earned money if you can write fluently and don't mind playing to the common understanding and liking for once in a way. You can sign it any name you like as a pseudonym. Yours sincerely

Geo. W. Russell (Letters 43)

Joyce took the offer, and "The Sisters" was published on 13 August 1904 using the pseudonym Stephen Dædalus, a name given to one of Joyce's semi-autobiographical literary characters in his later novels A Portrait of the Artist as a Young Man and Ulysses. "The Sisters" was the start of a series called Dubliners that he hoped the Homestead would continue to publish. In fact, Joyce would write two more stories for the Homestead, "Eveline" and "After the Race", before complaints stopped the paper from publishing any more of his stories. Joyce, nevertheless, continued to add more stories to the collection. But he had great difficulty getting Dubliners published, and it wasn't until 1914 that the first edition of the book came out. During that decade, "The Sisters" went through a number of revisions.

The two published versions have essentially the same plot. The romantic style of the original, however, has been transformed to produce a modernist text. The 1914 version, like the other Dubliners stories, is written in a style Joyce called "scrupulous meanness", the direct presentation of what is "seen and heard".

Other changes were made to characterisation and relationships. In particular, Joyce severely strengthened the relationship between the priest and the boy, making it stand out as a memorable feature of the story.

Father James Flynn may be "what [James] Joyce might have become as parish priest" had he not left Dublin.

Although Catholicism was a resource for Joyce, he felt animosity toward it as a belief system. On 29 August 1904, he wrote to Nora: "Six years ago I left the Catholic Church hating it most fervently. I found it impossible to remain in it on account of the impulses of my nature. ... Now I make open war upon it by what I write and say and do." In "Ireland, Isle of Saints and Sages", a lecture he gave in Trieste in 1907, Joyce said, "I confess that I do not see what good it does to fulminate against the English tyranny while the Roman tyranny occupies the place of the soul." In January 1904, in his essay "A Portrait of the Artist as a Young Man", Joyce said he had abandoned "open warfare" with the Church for what he called "urbanity in warfare", meaning "obliquity".

Joyce attacked the Church obliquely in both versions of "The Sisters." The original version parodies the Catholic mass and Joyce developed and sharpened the parody in his revision. In Catholicism, "Eucharist" refers both to the act of Consecration, or transubstantiation, and its product, the body and blood of Christ under the appearances of bread and wine. In "The Sisters", Father Flynn is said to have dropped his chalice, which "contained nothing", a way of saying that the spilt wine had not been changed into the blood of Christ. Flynn's "idle chalice" contradicts the doctrine of the Eucharist.

It has been noted that from Father Flynn in "The Sisters" to Father Purdon in "Grace" "there is not a single priest [in Dubliners] who is not somehow morally and intellectually compromised".

In Joyce's Stephen Hero, "an epiphany" is defined "as a sudden spiritual manifestation, whether in the vulgarity of speech or of gesture or in a memorable phase of the mind itself". Both forms are found in "The Sisters", in Eliza's conversation and in the boy's dream of Father Flynn.

== Reception ==
"The Sisters" has been a subject of scholarly debate, mostly in regard to the priest's illness. One analysis of Father Flynn's illness throughout the second version of the story shows that Joyce deliberately implied that Father Flynn had central nervous system syphilis. Joyce was interested and qualified enough in medicine to be able to describe a syphilitic and had definite reasons for doing so. The syphilitic nature of Father Flynn's illness is apparent in the author's use of paralysis, which was often used synonymously with paresis (general paralysis of the insane) when Joyce began his revisions in 1905.

The priest having suffered from a sexually transmitted infection would help account for the adult society's negative opinion and disdain for him.

But, on the other hand, the opening sentence of the story states unambiguously, "There was no hope for him this time: it was the third stroke." The paralysis is also perfectly explainable as a result of the series of strokes.

== Adaptations ==
- In February 2017, a short film adaptation of "The Sisters" was written and directed by Matthew Eberle.

== Online texts ==
- The Sisters (1904) – From the 13 August 1904 issue of The Irish Homestead.
- The Sisters (1914) – From the book Dubliners.

== Bibliography ==
- Albert, Leonard, "Gnomonology: Joyce's 'The Sisters,'" James Joyce Quarterly, vol. 27, no. 2 (winter 1990), pp. 353–364.
- Benstock, Bernard, "Joyce's 'The Sisters,'" Explicator, vol. 24 (September 1965), item 1.
- Benstock, Bernard, "'The Sisters' and the Critics," James Joyce Quarterly, vol. 4, no. 1 (Fall 1966), pp. 32–35.
- Boldrini, Lucia. "'The Sisters' and the 'Inferno': an intertextual network," Style, vol. 25, issue 3 (Fall 1991), pp. 453–465.
- Booker, M. K., "History and Language in Joyce's 'The Sisters,'" Criticism: A Quarterly for Literature and the Arts, vol. 33, no. 2 (Spring 1991), pp. 217–233.
- Bowen, Zack, "Joyce's Prophylactic Paralysis: Exposure in Dubliners," James Joyce Quarterly, vol. 19, no. 3 (Spring 1982), pp 257–273.
- Bremen, Brian A., "'He Was Too Scrupulous Always': A Re-examination of Joyce's 'The Sisters,'" James Joyce Quarterly, vol. 22, no. 1 (Fall 1984), pp. 55–66.
- Brandabur, Edward, "'The Sisters,'" pp. 333–343 in: Joyce, James, "Dubliners": Text, Criticism, and Notes, ed. Robert Scholes and A. Walton Litz, New York: Viking Press, 1969.
- Burman, Jack, "'A Rhetorician's Dream': Joyce's Revision of 'The Sisters'," Studies in Short Fiction, vol. 16, Issue 1 (Winter 1979), pp. 55–59.
- Chadwick, Joseph, "Silence in 'The Sisters,'" James Joyce Quarterly, vol. 21, no. 3 (Spring 1984), pp. 245–255.
- Connolly, Thomas E., "Joyce's 'The Sisters': A Pennyworth of Snuff," College English, vol.27, no. 3 (December 1965), pp. 189–195.
- Corrington, John William, "'The Sisters'" pp. 13–25 in: Hart, Clive (ed.), James Joyce's Dubliners: Critical Essays, London: Faber & Faber, 1969.
- Crawford, Claudia, "James Joyce's 'The Sisters': A Letter-L-Analysis," American Imago: Studies in Psychoanalysis and Culture, vol. 41, no. 2 (Summer 1984), pp. 181–199.
- Cronin, Edward J., "James Joyce's Trilogy and Epilogue: 'The Sisters,' 'An Encounter,' 'Araby,' and 'The Dead,'" Renascence: Essays on Value in Literature, vol. 31 (1979), pp. 229–248.
- Dædalus, Stephen (Joyce pseudonym), "The Sisters," The Irish Homestead, 13 August 1904, pp. 676–7
- Dettmar, Kevin J. H., "From Interpretation to 'Intrepidation': Joyce's 'The Sisters' as a Precursor of the Postmodern Mystery," pp. 149–165 in: Walker, Ronald G. (ed.) and Frazer, June M. (ed.), The Cunning Craft: Original Essays on Detective Fiction and Contemporary Literary Theory, Macomb: Western Illinois Univ.; 1990.
- Dilworth, Thomas, "Not 'too much noise': Joyce's 'The Sisters' in Irish Catholic Perspective", Twentieth Century Literature, vol. 39, no. 1 (Spring 1993) pp. 99–112.
- Doherty, G., "The Art of Confessing: Silence and Secrecy in James Joyce's The 'Sisters'", James Joyce Quarterly, vols. 35/36, nos. 4/1 (Summer/Fall 1998), pp. 657–664.
- Doherty, Paul C., "Words as Idols: The Epiphany in James Joyce's 'The Sisters,'" CEA Critic, vol. 32 (October 1969), pp. 10–11.
- Duffy, Edward, "'The Sisters' as the Introduction to Dubliners," Papers on Language & Literature, vol. 22, Issue 4 (Fall 1986), p417–428.
- Fabian, David R., "Joyce's 'The Sisters': Gnomon, Gnomic, Gnome," Studies in Short Fiction, vol. 5 (Winter 1968), pp. 187–189.
- Fahey, William, "Joyce's 'The Sisters,'" Explicator, vol. 17 (January 1959), item 26.
- Ferguson, Suzanne, "A Sherlook at Dubliners: Structural and Thematic Analogues in Detective Stories and the Modern Short Story," James Joyce Quarterly, vol. 16, nos. 1/2 (Fall 1978/1979), pp. 111–121.
- Fischer, Therese, "From Reliable to Unreliable Narrator: Rhetorical Changes in Joyce's 'The Sisters,'" James Joyce Quarterly, vol. 9, no. 1 (Fall 1971), pp. 85–92.
- French, Marilyn, "Joyce and Language," James Joyce Quarterly, vol. 19, no.3 (Spring 1982), pp. 239–255.
- Geary, Edward A. "Undecidability in Joyce's 'The Sisters,'" Studies in Short Fiction, vol. 26 (Summer 1989), pp. 305–310.
- Gleeson, W. F., jr., "Joyce's 'The Sisters,'" Explicator, vol. 22 (December 1963), item 30.
- Harty, John, "The Doubling of Dublin Messages in 'The Sisters,'" Notes on Modern Irish Literature, vol. 4 (1992), pp. 42–44.
- Herring, Phillip, "Structure and Meaning in Joyce's 'The Sisters,'" pp. 131–144 in: Benstock, Bernard (ed.), The Seventh of Joyce, Bloomington: Indiana University Press, 1982.
- Kennedy, Eileen, "'Lying Still': Another Look at 'The Sisters,'" James Joyce Quarterly, vol. 12, no. 4 (Summer 1975), pp. 362–370.
- Kuehl, John, "a la joyce: The Sisters Fitzgerald's Absolution," James Joyce Quarterly, vol. 2, no. 1 (Fall 1964), pp. 2–6.
- Lachtman, Howard, "The Magic-Lantern Business: James Joyce's Ecclesiastical Satire in Dubliners," James Joyce Quarterly, vol. 7, no. 2 (Winter 1970), pp. 82–92.
- Lercaro, Giacomo (1959). A Small Liturgical Dictionary. London: Burns & Oates.
- Leonard, G. M., "The Free Man's Journal: The Making of History in Joyce's 'The Sisters,'" Modern Fiction Studies, vol 36, no.4 (Winter 1990), pp. 455–482.
- Lyons, J. B., "Animadversions on Paralysis as a Symbol in 'The Sisters,'" James Joyce Quarterly, vol. 11, no. 3 (Spring 1974), pp. 257–265.
- Magalaner, Marvin, "'The Sisters' of James Joyce," University of Kansas City Review, vol. 18 (Summer 1952), pp. 255–261.
- McDermott, John V., "Joyce's 'The Sisters'," The Explicator vol. 51, no. 4 (Summer 1993), pp. 236–237.
- Morrissey, L. J., "Joyce's Revision of 'The Sisters': From Epicleti to Modern Fiction," James Joyce Quarterly, vol. 24, no. 1 (Fall 1986), pp. 33–54.
- Murphy, T. P., "James Joyce and narrative territory: The distinct functions of lost time in 'An Encounter' and 'The Sisters,'" Journal of Literary Semantics, vol. 33, no. 2 (2004), pp. 131–154.
- Newell, Kenneth B., "The Sin of Knowledge in Joyce's 'The Sisters,'" Ball State University Forum, vol. 20, no. 3 (1979), pp. 44–53.
- Reynolds, Michael S., "The Feast of the Most Precious Blood and Joyce's 'The Sisters'" Studies in Short Fiction, vol. 6 (Spring 1969), p. 336.
- Robinson, David W., "The Narration of Reading in Joyce's 'The Sisters', 'An Encounter', and 'Araby,'" Texas Studies in Literature and Language, vol. 29, no. 4 (Winter 1987), pp. 377–396.
- Roughley, Alan, "Writing Disgust: Joyce's Articulation of the Abject in The Sisters," Mattoid, vol. 48 (1994), pp. 213–224.
- San Juan, Epifanio, jr., "Method and Meaning in Joyce's 'The Sisters,'" Die Neueren Sprachen, vol. 20 (1971), pp. 490–496.
- Senn, Fritz, "'He was too scrupulous always': Joyce's 'The Sisters,'" James Joyce Quarterly, vol. 2, no. 2 (Winter 1965), pp. 66–72.
- Schork, R. J., "Liturgical Irony in Joyce's 'The Sisters,'" Studies in Short fiction, vol. 26, no. 2 (Spring 1989), pp. 193–197.
- Spielberg, Peter, "'The Sisters': No Christ at Bethany," James Joyce Quarterly, vol. 3, no. 3 (Spring 1966), pp. 192–195.
- Staley, T. F., "A Beginning: Signification, Story, and Discourse in Joyce's 'The Sisters,'" Genre, vol. 12, no. 4 (Winter 1979), pp. 533–549.
- Stein, William Bysshe, "Joyce's 'The Sisters,'" Explicator, vol. 20 (March 1962), item 61.
- Stein, William Bysshe, "Joyce's 'The Sisters,'" Explicator, vol. 21 (September 1962), item 2.
- Swartzlander, S. "James Joyce's 'The sisters': chalices and umbrellas, Ptolemaic Memphis and Victorian Dublin," Studies in Short Fiction, vol. 32, no. 3 (Summ 1995), pp. 295–306.
- Torchiana, Donald T., "The Opening of Dubliners: A Reconsideration," Irish University Review, vol. 1 (Spring 1971), pp. 149–160.
- Waisbren, Burton A. and Walzl, Florence L., "Paresis and the Priest: James Joyce's Symbolic Use of Syphilis in 'The Sisters,'" Annals of Internal Medicine, vol. 80, no. 6 (June 1974), pp. 758–762.
- Walzl, Florence L., "A Date in Joyce's 'The Sisters,'" Texas Studies in Literature and Language, vol. 4 (Summer 1962), pp. 183–187.
- Walzl, Florence L., "Joyce's 'The Sisters': A Development," James Joyce Quarterly, vol. 10, no. 4 (Summer 1973), pp. 375–421.
- Walzl, Florence L., "The Life Chronology of Dubliners," James Joyce Quarterly, vol. 14, no. 4 (Summer 1977), pp. 408–415.
- West, Michael, "Old Cotter and the Enigma of Joyce's 'The Sisters,'" Modern Philology, vol. 67, no. 4 (May 1970), pp. 370–372.
- Wohlpart, A. James, "Laughing in the Confession-Box: Vows of Silence in Joyce's 'The Sisters,'" James Joyce Quarterly, vol. 30, no. 3 (Spring 1993), pp. 409–417.
- Zlotnick, Joan, "Dubliners in Winesburg, Ohio: A Note on Joyce's 'The Sisters' and Anderson's 'The Philosopher'," Studies in Short Fiction, vol. 12, issue 412 (Fall 1975), pp. 405–407.
