= The Bohemian Girl (disambiguation) =

The Bohemian Girl is an opera composed by Michael Balfe.

The Bohemian Girl may also refer to:

- The Bohemian Girl (1922 film), a British film
- The Bohemian Girl (1936 film), a 1936 feature film version of the opera
- The Bohemian Girl (short story), a short story by Willa Cather
