= I Dreamt I Dwelt in Marble Halls =

Popular aria

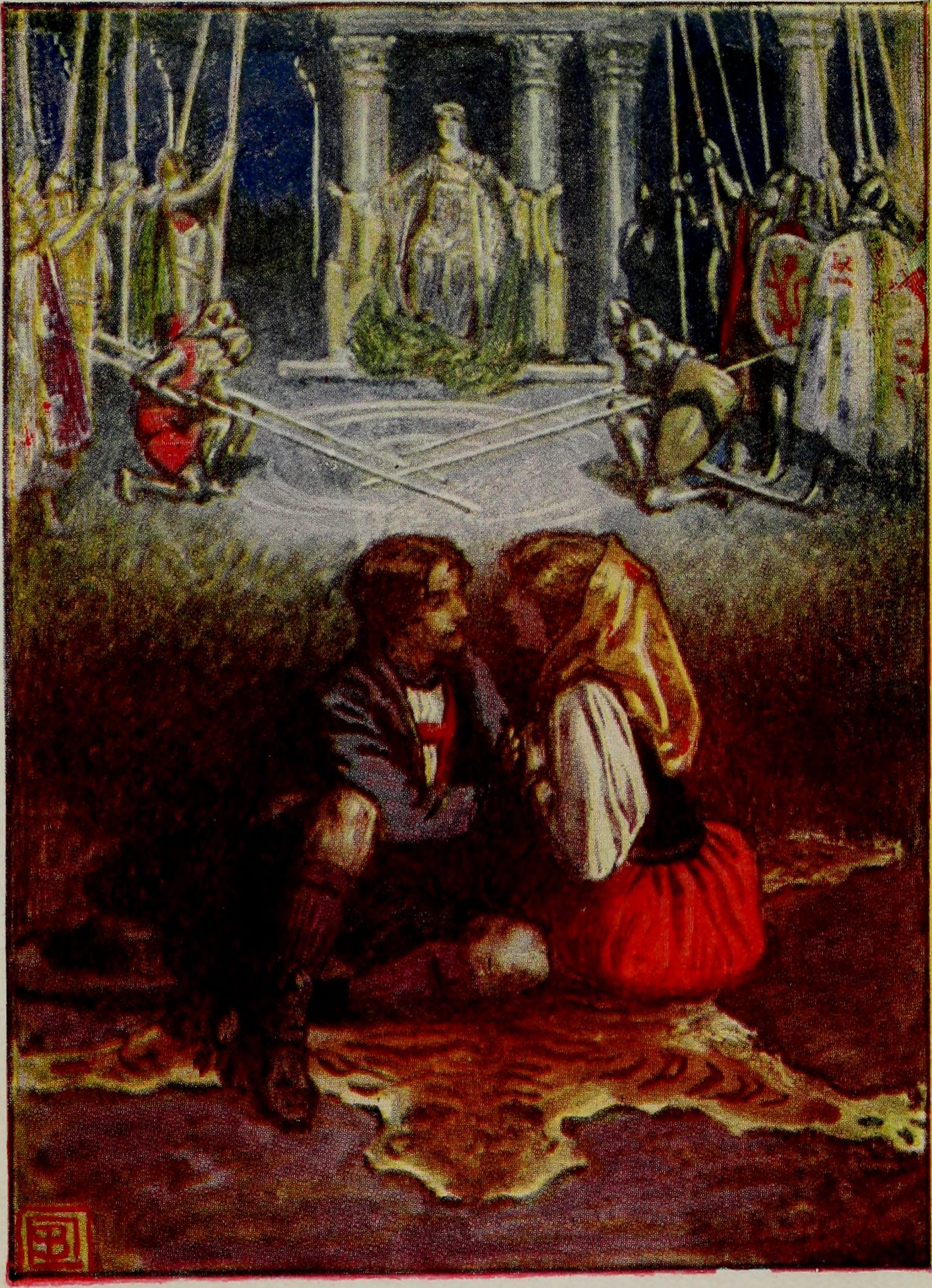
Illustration of the song by Byam Shaw

"I Dreamt I Dwelt in Marble Halls", or "The Gipsy Girl's Dream", is a popular aria from The Bohemian Girl, an 1843 opera by Michael William Balfe, with lyrics by Alfred Bunn. It is sung in the opera by the character Arline, who is in love with Thaddeus, a Polish nobleman and political exile.

== In popular culture ==
The song was popular in the 19th and 20th centuries, and has been recorded many times by musicians. It has also been parodied.

- Lewis Carroll's parody of the lyrics was published in Lays of Mystery, Imagination and Humour in 1855:
  I dreamt I dwelt in marble halls,
  And each damp thing that creeps and crawls
  went wobble-wobble on the walls...
- The opera is featured in two short stories from James Joyce's 1914 collection Dubliners: "Clay" and "Eveline".
- The opera was made into a 1936 Laurel and Hardy film, The Bohemian Girl, which featured an 18-year old Arline singing the song to her adoptive gypsy father, Oliver.
- The 1941 Glenn Miller song "I Dreamt I Dwelt in Harlem" is an allusion to the song.
- The Irish singer Enya recorded an ambient, ethereal cover version for her third studio album, Shepherd Moons, released in 1994 as the fourth single for the album; this version was featured on the soundtrack of the 1993 Martin Scorsese film, The Age of Innocence.
- The tune was used as the introductory music to the 1972 TV comedy series “In for a penny”.
