= An Encounter =

- Short story by James Joyce
- Country: Ireland
- Language: English
- Genre: short story

Publication
- Published in: Dubliners
- Publication type: Collection
- Media type: Print
- Publication date: 1914

Chronology
The Sisters	Araby

"An Encounter" is a short story by James Joyce. It is second in a collection of Joyce's short stories called Dubliners. In the story, two young boys experience an eerie encounter with a strange, old man. It deals with themes such as routine and wanderlust.

== The story ==
The story, narrated in the first person, is about a boy and his friend Mahony taking a day off from school to seek adventure in their dull lives. The boy has sought escape from his daily routine in stories of the Wild West and American detective stories and in make-believe warfare with his schoolmates. However, "The mimic warfare of the evening became at last as wearisome to me as the routine of school in the morning because I wanted real adventures to happen to myself. But real adventures, I reflected, do not happen to people who remain at home: they must be sought abroad." His plan is to play truant, walk to the docks along the Liffey, Dublin's river, cross it by ferry, and walk toward the Pigeon House, Dublin's power station. The story describes the boys' excursion and the people they see. They get a glimpse of the world outside Dublin in the foreign sailors at the docks and are exposed to the city's social diversity. They become too tired to go to the Pigeon House and stop to rest. An older man approaches them and begins talk of such mundane subjects as reading Sir Walter Scott and boys having young sweethearts. At one point, the man excuses himself and it is implied that he masturbates. His friend Mahony leaves the boy alone. The man returns and begins a drawn-out monologue on the need to whip boys who misbehave. Deeply unsettled, the boy gets up to leave and calls to Mahony. He's relieved when his friend comes to him, but also ashamed for having looked down on him.

Joyce's brother Stanislaus wrote that the story was based on their encounter with an "elderly pederast" while playing truant.

The boys' journey to the Pigeon House has been interpreted as a futile quest for Ireland's Church, like the visit to the bazaar "Araby", and the pervert they encounter has been taken as a counterpart to Father Flynn in "The Sisters".

== Adaptation ==
In 2021, an eponymous modern short film adaptation, written by Mark O'Halloran, was released.

== Online texts ==
- An Encounter – From the book Dubliners.
