= A Painful Case =

- Short story by James Joyce
- Country: Ireland
- Language: English
- Genre: short story

Publication
- Published in: Dubliners
- Publication type: Collection
- Media type: Print
- Publication date: 1914

Chronology
Clay	Ivy Day in the Committee Room

"A Painful Case" is a short story by Irish author James Joyce published in his 1914 collection Dubliners. The story details a platonic affair between an isolated man and a married woman, the breaking off of the affair, and its aftermath.

== Plot ==
Mr Duffy, a middle-aged bank cashier, deliberately lives in an isolated suburb of Dublin. He is characterized as very meticulous and ordered, and has little social contact. At a concert one night, Duffy makes the acquaintance of Mrs Emily Sinico, a married mother. They start up a relationship that is innocent enough to be condoned by Mrs Sinico's husband, who believes the two's discussions revolve mostly around his daughter and the possibility of a relationship between her and Duffy. The two draw closer together, and one night Mrs Sinico impulsively takes his hand and presses it to her cheek, but Duffy is not pleased at the development and ends their meetings. Four years later he reads that Mrs Sinico has been struck by a train and killed. The newspaper article, the title of which provides the title of the story, contains an account by her husband, who states that she began drinking two years earlier. The details of the accident suggest that she may have caused her own death. Duffy reacts at first with revulsion, concluding that some inherent weakness led to her drinking and the accident, but he slowly comes to believe that it was his rejection that condemned her to solitude and death. He reflects on his own loneliness: "No one wanted him; he was outcast from life's feast." The story ends with Duffy listening to the silence of the surrounding night on a hill overlooking Dublin where he and Mrs Sinico used to sit and talk, where he realizes just how lonely he really is.

Stanislaus Joyce believed that "A Painful Case" was based on an entry in his diary describing two encounters with a young woman when he was eighteen—his brother, writing the story in Trieste, having given her a Triestine name—and that James Duffy was "intended to be a portrait of what my brother imagined I should become in middle age". There is also the possibility that James Duffy is "what [James] Joyce... might have been as bank clerk" had he remained in Dublin.
