= The Bohemian Girl =

1843 romantic opera

- Romantic opera by Michael William Balfe
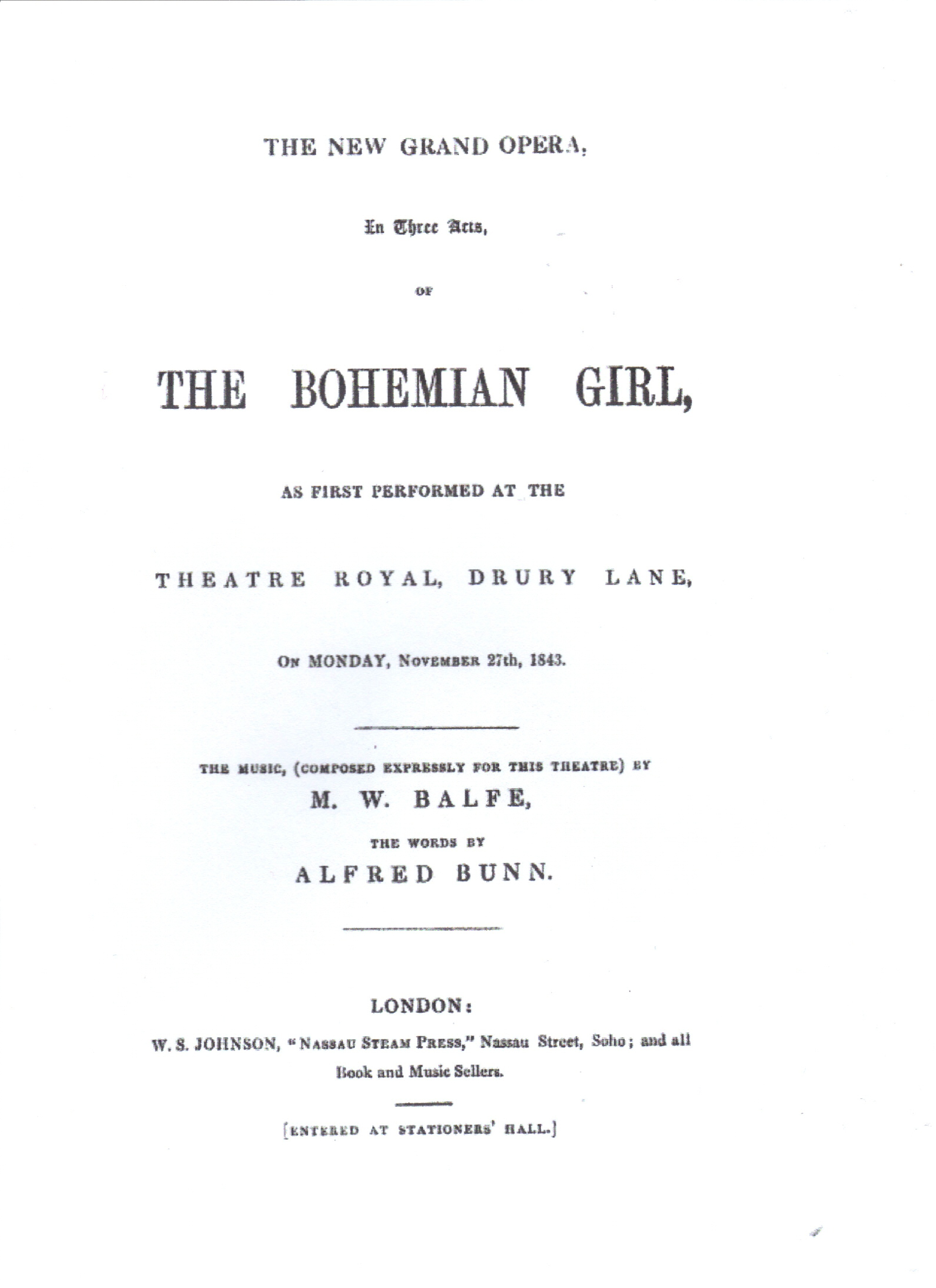
- Title page of the original libretto
- Librettist: Alfred Bunn
- Language: English
- Based on: La gitanilla by Miguel de Cervantes
- Premiere: 27 November 1843; Drury Lane Theatre, London

The Bohemian Girl is an English language Romantic opera composed by Michael William Balfe with a libretto by Alfred Bunn. The plot is loosely based on a Miguel de Cervantes' tale, La gitanilla.

The best-known aria from the piece is "I Dreamt I Dwelt in Marble Halls" in which the main character, Arline, describes her vague memories of her childhood. It has been recorded by many artists, most famously by Dame Joan Sutherland, and also by the Norwegian soprano Sissel Kyrkjebø and Irish singer Enya.

== Performance history ==
The opera was first produced in London at the Drury Lane Theatre on 27 November 1843. Abigail Betts played the Gypsy Queen which was not the main role but she was known for this performance. The production ran for more than 100 nights and enjoyed many revivals worldwide including: New York City (25 November 1844), Dublin (1844) and Philadelphia (1844).

Several versions in different languages were also staged during Balfe's lifetime. The German version, Die Zigeunerin, premiered in Vienna in 1846, the Italian adaptation and translation, titled La zingara, was originally staged in Trieste in 1854, and finally a four-act French version, La Bohémienne, was mounted in Rouen in 1862, conducted by composer Jules Massenet, then aged only 20, and with the celebrated mezzo-soprano Célestine Galli-Marié in the role of the Gypsy Queen. If Die Zigeunerin enjoyed fairly widespread circulation in the countries of German language or culture, La zingara was often revived also in English-speaking cities, such as London, Dublin, New York, Boston and San Francisco. The very successful 1858 run of La zingara at Her Majesty's Theatre in London, for which Balfe was rewarded with an extra cheque for fifty pounds, starred Marietta Piccolomini, Marietta Alboni and Antonio Giuglini.

The opera "remained in the repertories of British touring companies until the 1930s and was revived in 1932 at Sadler's Wells". Since World War II, it has been staged in a production by Dennis Arundell at Covent Garden in 1951 with Beecham conducting and a cast consisting of Roberta Peters, Anthony Marlowe, Jess Walters, Edith Coates, Howell Glynne and Murray Dickie, by the Belfast Operatic Society at the 1978 Waterford International Festival of Light Opera, in Ireland, by Castleward Opera, Strangford, in Northern Ireland in 2006 and by Opera South, Haslemere, in England in 2008.

== Roles ==
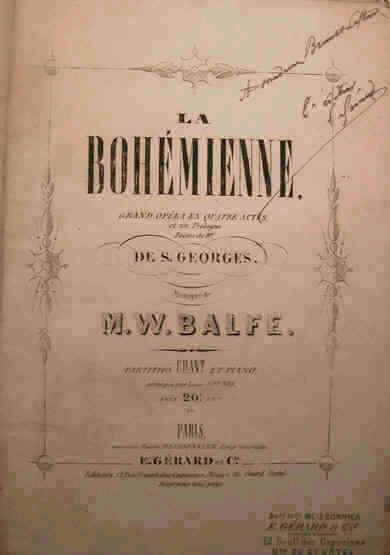
Title page of a French printed score (1869)

Role	Voice type	Premiere cast, 27 November 1843 (Conductor: Michael William Balfe )
Arline, daughter of Count Arnheim	soprano	Miss Payne (Act 1); Elizabeth Rainforth (Acts 2–3)
Thaddeus, a Polish fugitive	tenor	William Harrison
Count Arnheim	baritone	Conrado Borrani
Queen of the Gypsies	contralto	Abigail Betts
Devilshoof, chief of the gypsies	bass	George Stretton
Florestein, nephew of the Count	tenor	James Hudson
Buda, Arline's attendant	soprano	Miss Payne
Captain of the Guard	bass	Howell
Officer	tenor	John Binge
First Gypsy		Birt
Second Gypsy		T. Ridgway

== Synopsis ==
=== Act 1 ===
A Polish noble, Thaddeus, in exile in Austria, joins a band of gypsies. He saves Arline, the infant daughter of Count Arnheim, from being killed by a deer. The count, in gratitude, invites him to a banquet, where Thaddeus refuses to toast a statue of the Austrian Emperor, instead splashing it with wine, and escapes from his enraged host with the help of his gypsy friend Devilshoof, who kidnaps Arline.

=== Act 2 ===
Twelve years have elapsed. Arline can only vaguely remember her noble upbringing. She and Thaddeus are sweethearts, but the Gypsy Queen is also in love with him. Arnheim's nephew Florestein falls in love with Arline (not recognising her), but the Queen plants a medallion stolen from Florestein on Arline. Florestein recognises the medallion and has her arrested. She is tried before the Count who recognises the scar left on her arm from the deer attack.

=== Act 3 ===
Arline is at a ball in her father's castle, where she feels nostalgic for her Romany upbringing and for her true love. Thaddeus breaks into the castle through a window and pleads for her hand. He eventually wins the trust of the count whom he insulted twelve years ago, and the Count gives them his blessing. The Gypsy Queen stalks Thaddeus to the castle and tries to break in through the same window to kill Arline with a musket and kidnap Thaddeus. Before she can execute her plan, however, Devilshoof tries to wrest the weapon from her hands and she is accidentally killed in the scuffle.

== Musical numbers ==
Overture (one in A major for the 1843 production, and a completely different one in C major for the 1867 Paris production conducted by Jules Pasdeloup)

Act 1

1. "Up with the Banner, and Down with the Slave"
2. "'Tis Sad to Leave Our Fatherland"
3. "In the Gypsy's Life"
4. "Is No Succour Near at Hand?"
5. "Down with the Daring Slave"
6. "What Sound Breaks on the Ear?"
7. "Follow, Follow"

Act 2

8. "Silence, Silence"
9. "Wine, Wine!"
10. "I Dreamt I Dwelt in Marble Halls"
11. "The Secret of Her Birth"
12. "Happy and Light of Heart Are Those"
13. "'Tis Gone, the Past Was All a Dream"
14. "Come with the Gipsy Bride"
15. "Life Itself Is, at the Best"
16. "To the Hall!"
17. "The Heart Bow'd Down"
18. "Hold! Hold! We Cannot Give the Life We Take"

Act 3

19. "When Other Lips" (otherwise known as "Then You'll Remember Me")
20. "Through the World Wilt Thou Fly, Love"
21. "Welcome the Present"
22. "Oh, What Full Delight"

== Film versions ==
A silent movie version was made in Britain in 1922. Ellen Terry, much better known as a stage actress, made her last screen appearance as Buda the nursemaid. Ivor Novello plays Thaddeus, Gladys Cooper plays Arline, and C. Aubrey Smith plays Devilshoof.

An early sound short subject version of the opera was filmed in Britain in 1927, starring Pauline Johnson as Arline and Herbert Langley as Thaddeus.

The best-known version is undoubtedly the 1936 full-length Laurel and Hardy film, described in the opening credits as "A Comedy Version of The Bohemian Girl". The characters played by Laurel and Hardy do not appear in the stage opera, nor does Thaddeus appear in the film.

La gitanilla itself has been filmed three times, but never in English.

== Other references ==
The Bohemian Girl is mentioned in the short stories "Clay" and "Eveline" by James Joyce, which are both parts of Dubliners. In "Clay", the character Maria sings some lines from "I Dreamt I Dwelt in Marble Halls". The aria is quoted again in Joyce's novel Finnegans Wake.

In the P. G. Wodehouse short story "Without the Option", Oliver Randolph Sipperley, mainly referred to by Bertram Wooster as "Sippy", greets Wooster with the quote "the heart bowed down by weight of woe to weakest hope will cling".

George Orwell recalls "a little poem" he wrote in his essay "Why I Write". The poem's final verse runs: "I dreamt I dwelt in marble halls, / And woke to find it true..."

Booth Tarkington mentions the opera, though not by name, in The Two Vanrevels, and quotes a line of the aria "I Dreamt I Dwelt in Marble Halls".

The opera is mentioned, and the aria is referred to several times, in the novel Dragonwyck, by Anya Seton, set in 1844. The song also appears in the movie version of the book.

Willa Cather has referenced the work. One of her short stories, entitled "The Bohemian Girl", incorporates quotes from some of the arias (again including "I Dreamt I Dwelt in Marble Halls"). The plot of the story also has some substantial parallels to the original.

The aria "I Dreamt I Dwelt in Marble Halls" is sung in the film The Age of Innocence. The aria was played and sung by the character Clementina Cavendish in the 1998 film The Governess.

The opera is mentioned in Gone with the Wind when Melanie heads the Saturday Night Music Circle in Atlanta.

In the 1948 film “An Apartment For Peggy”, the aria is played on the piano by Peggy when she shows her landlord how she and her husband have turned his attic into a livable space.

== Recordings ==
Several recordings exist of "I Dreamt I Dwelt in Marble Halls"; one is included on Sutherland's compilation disc La Stupenda. Sutherland's husband, conductor Richard Bonynge, recorded a complete version of The Bohemian Girl with his protégée, Nova Thomas, singing the title role. It is one of the only complete recordings of the entire opera and still in print via ArkivMusic.

Balfe: The Bohemian Girl, National Symphony Orchestra of Ireland, RTÉ Philharmonic Choir

- Conductor: Richard Bonynge
- Principal singers: Nova Thomas (Arline), Patrick Power (Thaddeus), Jonathan Summers (Count Arnheim), Bernadette Cullen (Queen of the Gipsies), John del Carlo (Devilshoof), Timothy German (Florestein)
- Recording date and location: January 1991, National Concert Hall, Dublin
- Label: Argo, 433 324-2 (2 CDs)

Arthur Fiedler and the Boston Pops Orchestra recorded the opera's overture for RCA Victor in 1958 for an album titled Boston Tea Party. It was released on LP in stereo, and later reissued on CD.
