= Ivy Day in the Committee Room =

- Short story by James Joyce
- Country: Ireland
- Language: English
- Genre: short story

Publication
- Published in: Dubliners
- Publication type: Collection
- Media type: Print
- Publication date: 1914

Chronology
A Painful Case	A Mother

"Ivy Day in the Committee Room" is a short story by James Joyce published in his 1914 collection Dubliners. Taking place in a political party office after a day of canvassing, the story depicts various campaigners discussing the political candidates and issues of Irish nationalism and Home Rule. "Ivy Day" refers to an Irish holiday that commemorated Charles Stewart Parnell, an important Irish nationalist figure.

== Plot summary ==
In a committee room, Mat O'Connor, a canvasser for Richard Tierney, a candidate in an upcoming municipal election, discusses child-rearing with Old Jack, who tries to keep a fire going. Joe Hynes, another canvasser, arrives and needles O’Connor on whether he’s been paid for his work yet. He proceeds to defend rival candidate Colgan's working-class background and maintains that Tierney, although a Nationalist, will likely present a welcome address at the upcoming visit of King Edward VII.

When Hynes points out that it is Ivy Day (October 6), a commemoration of Charles Stewart Parnell, a nostalgic silence fills the room. Another canvasser, John Henchy, enters and derides Tierney for not having paid him yet. When Hynes leaves, Henchy voices a suspicion that the man is a spy for Colgan. Henchy badmouths another canvasser, Crofton, just before Crofton himself enters with Bantam Lyons. Crofton had worked for the Conservative candidate until the party withdrew and gave their support to Tierney.

The talk of politics drifts to Charles Stewart Parnell, who has his defenders and detractors in the room. Hynes returns and is encouraged to read his sentimental poem dedicated to Parnell. The poem is highly critical of those who betrayed him, including the Catholic Church, and places Parnell among the ancient heroes of Ireland. All applaud the performance and seem to forget their differences for the moment.

== Background ==
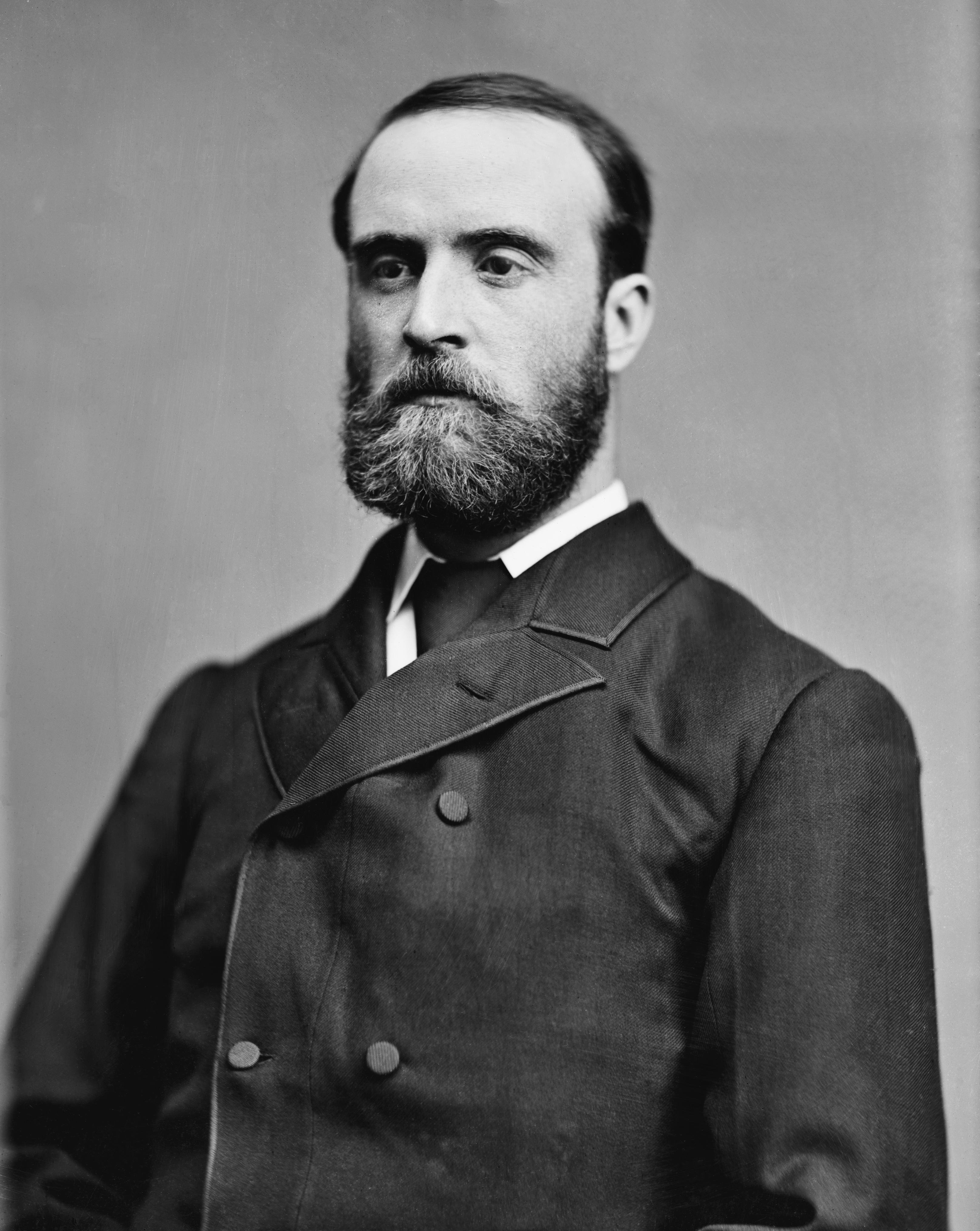
Charles Stewart Parnell

James Joyce attributed the ideas for both "The Dead" and "Ivy Day" to Anatole France, although the latter story also owes something to his brother Stanislaus's account of their father at work during a Dublin by-election three years earlier.

After being rejected by Arthur Symons's publishers, Joyce sent a twelve-story version of Dubliners to another publisher, Grant Richards in 1905. After their agreement collapsed, Joyce shopped the collection to Maunsel & Company, who agreed to publish the book in 1909. Dubliners now had fifteen stories, and the publisher balked at the passages about King Edward VII in "Ivy Day in the Committee Room". During arguments about the passage, Joyce actually wrote King George V to inquire if the text caused offense. The dispute could not be resolved, and Maunsel dropped the book. When Joyce sold the book back to Richards, the page proofs Maunsel created became the copy text.

Ireland had been under the rule of Great Britain since the sixteenth century. A movement for home rule, greater autonomy, began in the late nineteenth century. In "Ivy Day in the Committee Room," Joyce touches on the deep-rooted political struggle by noting nationalist Charles Stewart Parnell and his role in Irish politics. His representation in "Ivy Day" is clear from the title of the story: Ivy Day is the anniversary of the death of Parnell, the "uncrowned king of Ireland." Parnell wanted to give the Irish people a greater role in the management of their own affairs.

Parnell's ousting from power served to delay Irish independence. In "Ivy Day in the Committee Room", the campaigners for Tierney are not campaigning for him to get into office, but rather as a way for them to earn money. One of the characters acknowledges, however, that “Some of those hillsiders and Fenians are a bit too clever if you ask me... Do you know what my private and candid opinion is about some of those little jokers? I believe half of them are in the pay of the Castle” (i.e. Protestant officials). “Fenian” was a nickname given to those conspiring in a revolutionary movement to free Ireland from Britain, in other words radical nationalists. The inactivity in “Ivy Day in the Committee Room” serves to show Joyce’s view of Irish nationalism. The stagnant conversations speak to Ireland’s paralytic nature. Nothing being accomplished in this story reflects the fact that nothing was being done about obtaining Ireland’s independence.

The loss of political cohesion after Parnell's death prompted a Celtic Revival which attempted to establish a new Irish culture. Citizens tried to work out what it meant to live in Ireland with strong Irish roots. Ireland was split into segregated religious groups (Catholics versus Protestants), but most Irish were Catholic and wanted independence from Britain, as opposed to the mostly Protestant conservatives, who were in favour of staying under British rule. The two pillars of this Irish nationalism were the Catholic faith and pride in Ireland's Gaelic cultural heritage, which led to a renewed interest in the Irish language.
