= Ivy Day =

- Ivy Day (Ireland), October 6 in memory of the prominent nationalist politician Charles Stewart Parnell
- Ivy Day (United States), ceremonial occasion at older colleges when a class memorial stone is unveiled
