= The Boarding House =

- Short story by James Joyce
- Country: Ireland
- Language: English
- Genre: short story

Publication
- Published in: Dubliners
- Publication type: Collection
- Media type: Print
- Publication date: 1914

Chronology
Two Gallants	A Little Cloud

"The Boarding House" is a short story by James Joyce published in his 1914 collection Dubliners.

== Plot summary ==
Characters

- Mrs. Mooney – determined, clever, and brave daughter of the Butcher
- The Butcher – father of Mrs. Mooney
- Mr. Mooney – husband of Mrs. Mooney, works first for the Butcher, then failed butcher and drunkard
- Polly Mooney – beautiful and slim girl, daughter of Mr. and Mrs. Mooney
- Jack Mooney – son of Mrs. and Mr. Mooney
- Mr. Doran – highly educated clerk, is in a relationship with Polly Mooney

Mrs. Mooney looks forward to her confrontation, which she intends to "win" by defending her daughter's honor and convincing Mr. Doran to offer his hand in marriage. Waiting for the time to pass, Mrs. Mooney figures the odds are in her favor, considering that Mr. Doran, who has worked for a wine merchant for thirteen years and garnered much respect, will choose the option that least harms his career.

Meanwhile, Mr. Doran anguishes over the impending meeting with Mrs. Mooney. As he clumsily grooms himself for the appointment, he reviews the difficult confession to his priest that he made on Saturday evening, in which he was harshly reproved for his romantic affair. He knows he can either marry Polly or run away, the latter an option that would ruin his sound reputation. Convincing himself that he has been duped, Mr. Doran bemoans Polly's unimpressive family, her ill manners, and her poor grammar, and wonders how he can remain free and unmarried. In this vexed moment Polly enters the room and threatens to end her life out of unhappiness. In her presence, Mr. Doran begins to remember how he was bewitched by Polly's beauty and kindness, but he still wavers about his decision.

Bob Doran's subsequent annual drinking binge is referred to several times in Ulysses.

== Interpretation ==
It is noted that one of the songs Polly sings is "I'm a naughty girl", which Joyce scholar Zack Bowen suggested foreshadows Polly's affair with Mr. Doran.
