= Glasnevin Cemetery =

Cemetery in Dublin, Ireland

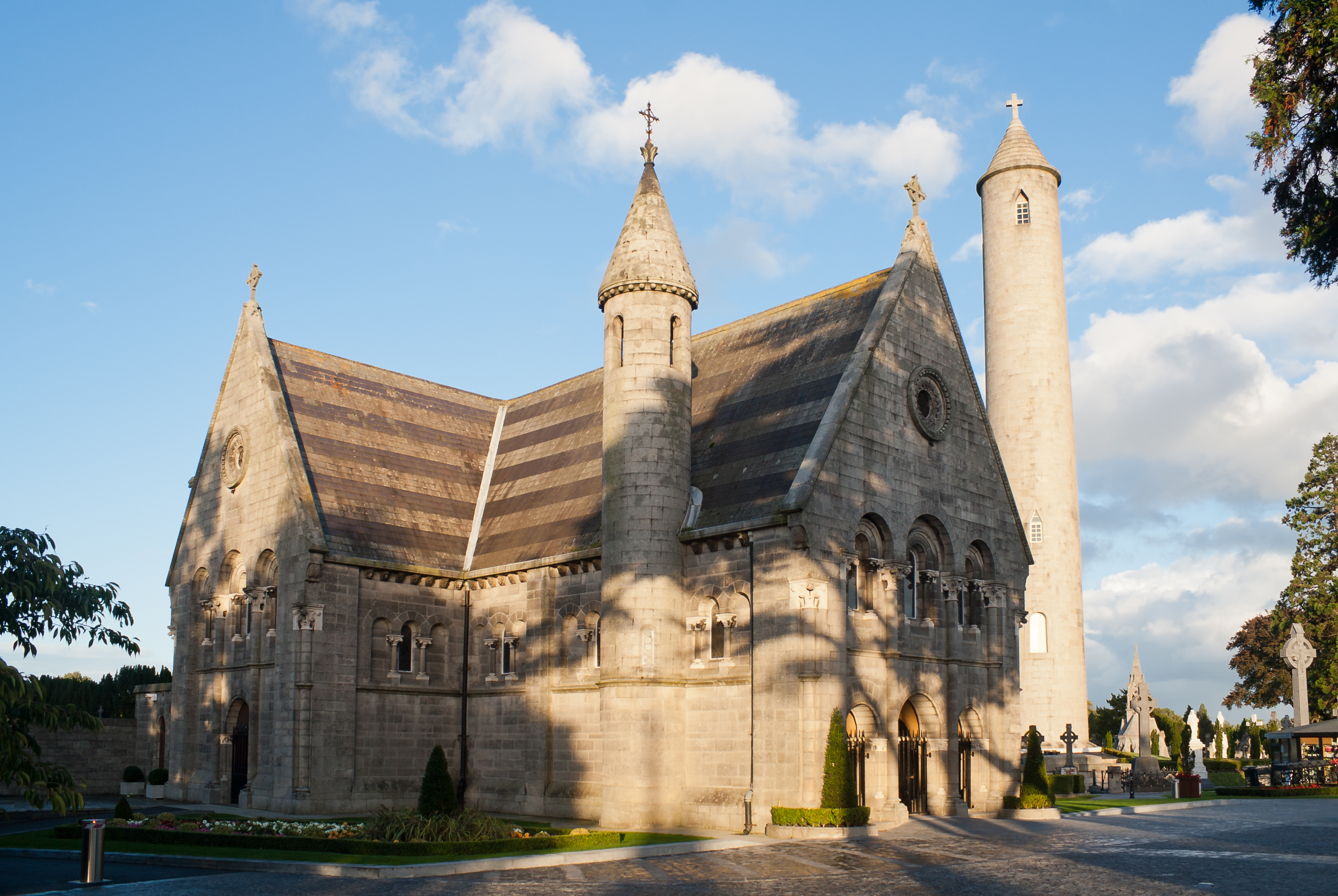
- The Glasnevin Mortuary Chapel alongside the O'Connell Tower
- Interactive map of Glasnevin Cemetery

Details
- Established: 1832
- Location: Glasnevin, Dublin
- Country: Ireland
- Coordinates: 53°22′20″N 6°16′40″W
- Type: Public
- Owned by: Dublin Cemeteries Trust
- Size: 124 acres (50 ha)
- No. of interments: 1.5 million
- Website: dctrust.ie/location/glasnevin.html

Glasnevin Cemetery (Irish: Reilig Ghlas Naíon) is the national cemetery of Ireland, located on the Northside of Dublin. More than 1.5 million people are buried in the cemetery, including a number of notable historical figures.

Established as a non-denominational garden cemetery by Daniel O'Connell in 1832, the cemetery is 124 acres (50 ha) in size and contains the gravesites of a number of historical figures, including Charles Stewart Parnell, Éamon de Valera, Constance Markievicz and Michael Collins.

Overseen by Dublin Cemeteries Trust, Glasnevin remains an active cemetery and cremation site. The cemetery contains a visitor centre, the landmark O'Connell Tower, and runs guided tours of the grounds.

== History ==
=== Founding ===
Prior to the establishment of Glasnevin Cemetery, Irish Catholics had no cemeteries of their own in which to bury their dead and, as the repressive Penal Laws of the eighteenth century placed many restrictions on the public performance of Catholic services, it had become normal practice for Catholics to conduct a limited version of their own funeral services in Protestant churchyards or graveyards.

This situation continued until an incident at a funeral held at St. Kevin's Churchyard in 1823 provoked public outcry when a Protestant sexton reprimanded a Catholic priest for proceeding to perform a limited version of a funeral mass.

The outcry prompted Daniel O'Connell, champion of Catholic rights, to push for the opening of a burial ground in which both Irish Catholics and Protestants could give their dead dignified burial. Due to the limited space for burials at Goldenbridge Cemetery in Inchicore, the nine-acre plot of land was purchased at Glasnevin, subsequently consecrated and opened to the public for the first time on 21 February 1832. The first burial, that of eleven-year-old Michael Carey from Francis Street in Dublin, took place on the following day in a section of the cemetery known as Curran's Square.

=== 19th century ===
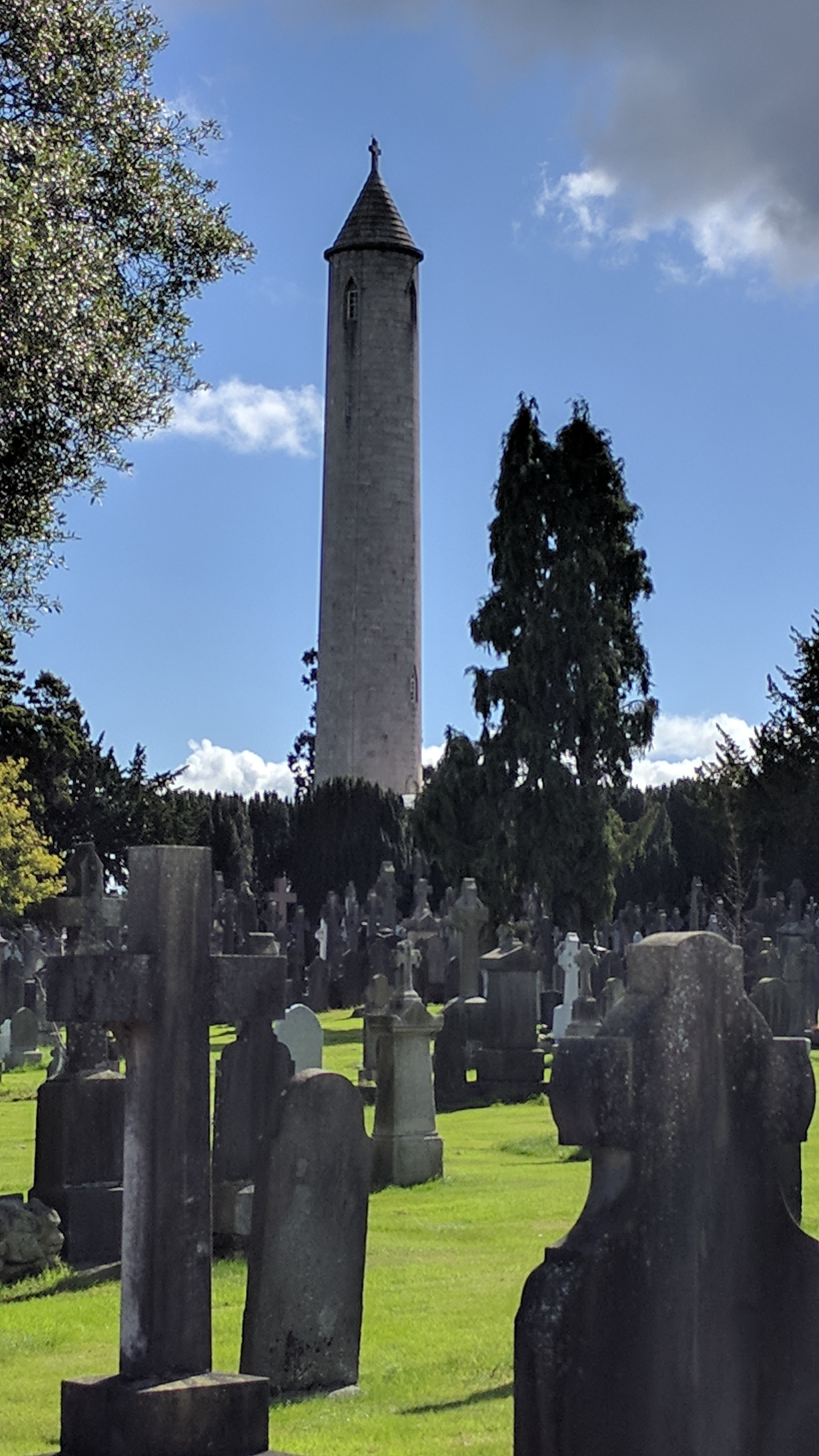
The O'Connell Tower stands over the tomb of the cemetery's founder, Daniel O'Connell

The cemetery was initially known as Prospect Cemetery, a name chosen from the townland of Prospect, which surrounded the cemetery lands. Besides the famous interred at Glasnevin, nearly 800,000 people have been buried in Glasnevin in unmarked mass graves due to the death toll from the Great Famine of the 1840s and a later cholera epidemic.

The high wall with watchtowers surrounding the main part of the cemetery was built to deter bodysnatchers, who were active in Dublin in the 18th and early 19th centuries. The watchmen also had a pack of bloodhounds who roamed the cemetery at night.

Following his death in 1847, Daniel O'Connell was initially buried in an area of the cemetery now known as the Old O'Connell Circle. In 1869, after the completion of the 55-metre tall O'Connell Tower, his remains were reinterred in a crypt located at the base of the monument.

Throughout the 19th century, the cemetery played host to a number of large funerals and commemorations. This included the funeral of Charles Stewart Parnell in October 1891, which has subsequently been marked annually as "Ivy Day".

=== 20th century ===
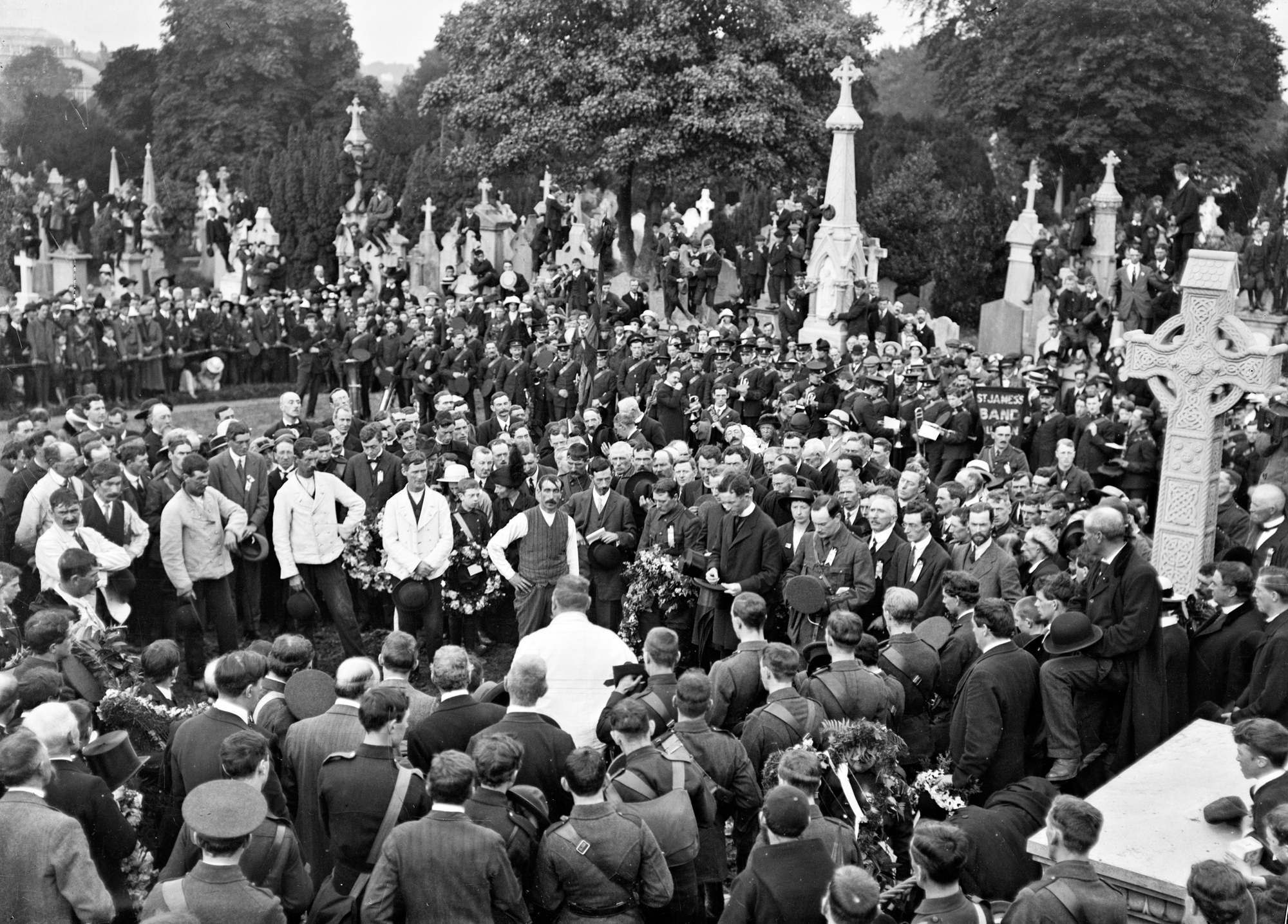
Crowds gathered at the graveside of Jeremiah O'Donovan Rossa in Glasnevin Cemetery on 1 August 1915.

Originally covering nine acres of ground, the area of the cemetery expanded throughout the 19th and 20th centuries, to approximately 124 acres, including St. Paul's section on the southern side of the Finglas Road, which opened in 1908.

During the Irish revolutionary period, Glasnevin Cemetery was the site of the funeral of Jeremiah O'Donovan Rossa. The graveside oration, delivered by Patrick Pearse at O'Donovan Rossa's funeral on 1 August 1915, had an impact on the mobilisation of Irish republicans and set the stage for the Easter Rising eight months later.

The funeral procession of Michael Collins to Glasnevin Cemetery on 28 August 1922 was the largest in the cemetery's history, with an estimated 500,000 people, one-fifth of the population of Ireland, lining the streets of Dublin to pay tribute.

In January 1971, a gelignite bomb was planted at the base of the O'Connell Tower, demolishing the original staircase and causing minor damage to the structure and the O'Connell crypt. The bombing was later attributed to Ulster loyalists in retaliation for the destruction of Nelson's Pillar on O'Connell Street in 1966.

In March 1982, the first crematorium in the Republic of Ireland was opened within the grounds of the cemetery. In subsequent decades, cremation services have grown in popularity.

=== 21st century ===
Over the latter decades of the 20th century, due to lack of funding, the cemetery entered a period of decline, which was reversed following the beginning of a restoration project intended on restoring the cemetery as both a visitor attraction and a centre for national remembrance. As part of the restoration programme, Glasnevin Cemetery Museum, designed by A&D Wejchert & Partners Architects was opened in March 2010, hosting guided tours, themed exhibitions and support for genealogists and those studying family history.

In 2009, Glasnevin Trust in co-operation with the Commonwealth War Graves Commission began identifying the graves of Irish service personnel who died while serving in the Commonwealth forces during the two world wars. These names were inscribed on two memorials, rededicated and relocated in 2011 to near the main entrance. A Cross of Sacrifice was erected in the cemetery, in a joint Irish-British commemoration ceremony, to mark the First World War centenary. As of October 2026, there were 234 service personnel of the Commonwealth of both wars identified as buried here.

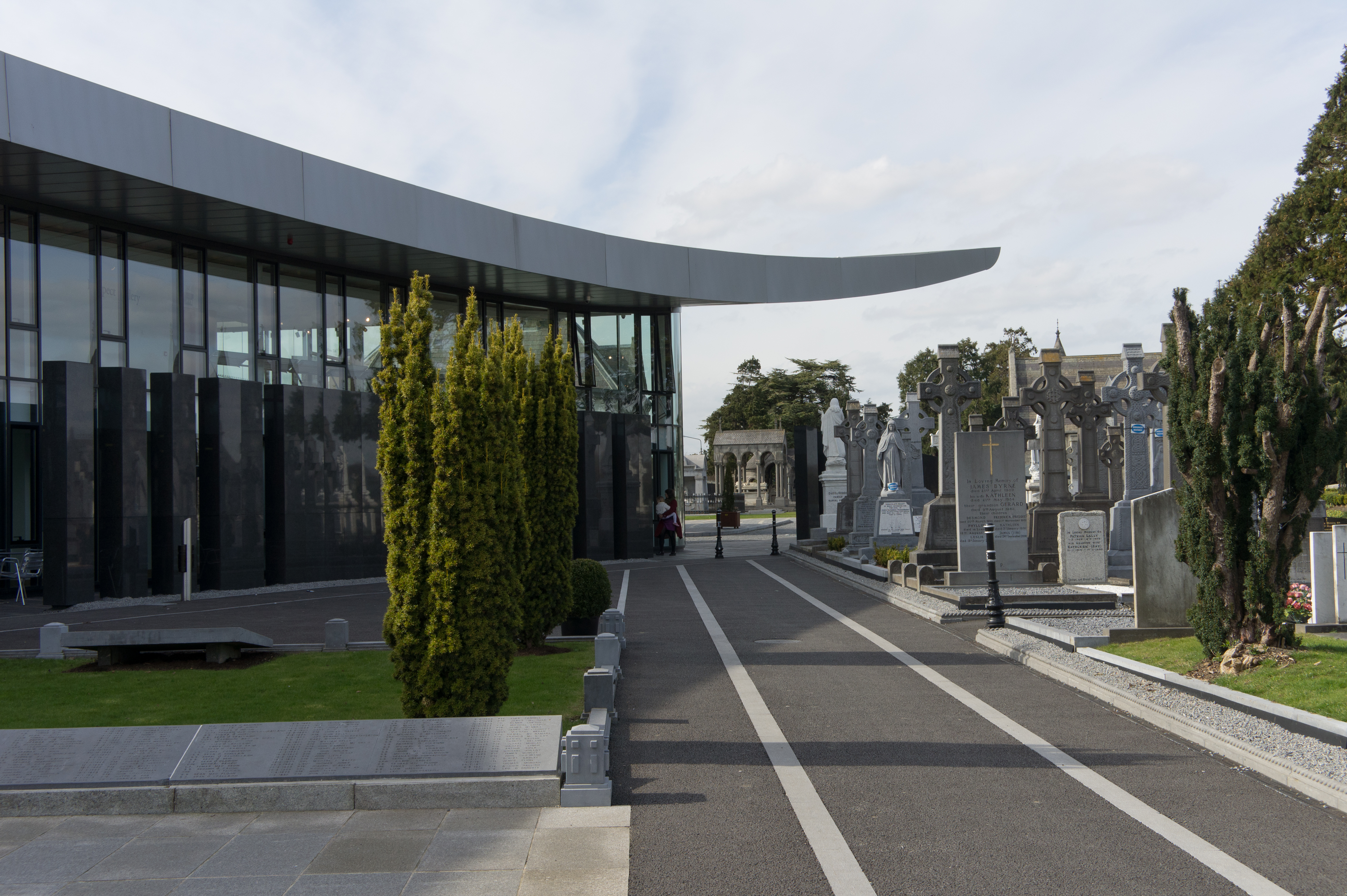
Glasnevin Cemetery Museum opened in March 2010

Glasnevin Cemetery was a focal point of national commemoration during the decade of centenaries between 2012 and 2022, including a state ceremony marking the centenary of the Easter Rising, and a visit by then-Prince Charles in 2017 to acknowledge those buried in the cemetery who were killed in the World Wars and the struggle for Irish independence.

As part of the cemetery's restoration project, the staircase of the O'Connell Tower was rebuilt using the structure's original plans, and was officially reopened to visitors in April 2018.

== Location ==
The cemetery is located in Glasnevin, Dublin, in two parts. The main part, with its high walls and watchtowers, is located on one side of the road from Finglas to the city centre, while the other part, St. Paul's, is located across the road and beyond a green space, between two railway lines. A gateway into the National Botanic Gardens, adjacent to the cemetery, was reopened in recent years.

== Features ==
=== Memorials and graves ===
The cemetery contains the graves of a number of Ireland's most prominent national figures. These include the graves of Daniel O'Connell, Charles Stewart Parnell, Michael Collins, Éamon de Valera, Arthur Griffith, Maude Gonne, Kevin Barry, Roger Casement, Constance Markievicz, Seán MacBride, Jeremiah O'Donovan Rossa, James Larkin, Brendan Behan, Christy Brown and Luke Kelly of the Dubliners.

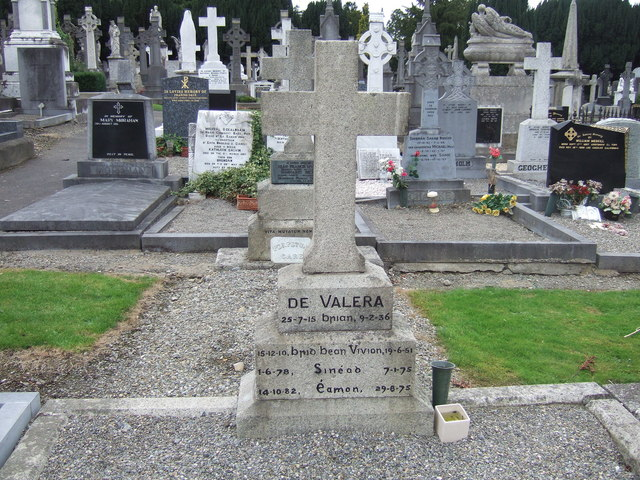
Grave of Éamon de Valera

The grave of Michael Collins, the nationalist leader who was killed in the Irish Civil War in 1922, is among the most visited sites in Glasnevin. Around him were buried at least 183 soldiers of the Irish Free State. In 1967, their names were recorded on a memorial around Collin's grave.

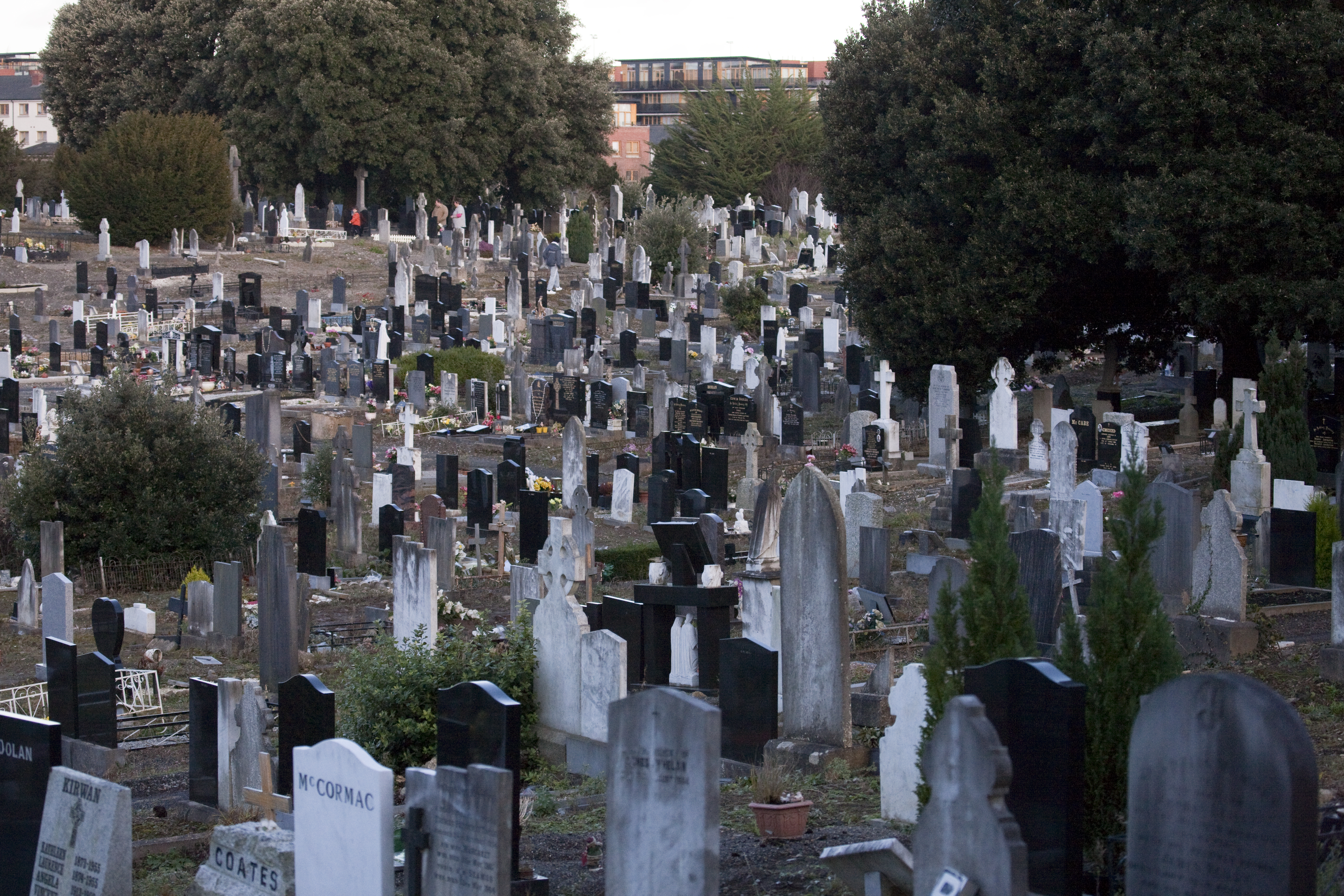
20th century gravestones.

In 1993, a mass grave at the site of a Magdalene laundry, institutions used to house "fallen women", was discovered after the convent which ran the laundry sold the land to a property developer. The remains were cremated and reburied in a mass grave at Glasnevin Cemetery, with the cost of the reburial split between the religious institutions involved and the developer who had bought the land.

=== Angels plot ===
Glasnevin is one of a small number of cemeteries that allowed stillborn babies to be buried in consecrated ground and contains an area called the Angels Plot.

=== Crematorium ===
In 1982, a crematorium was constructed within the cemetery grounds by Glasnevin Trust. Since then, the service has been used for people of various religious denominations who wished to be cremated.

=== Religious services ===
Catholic Mass is celebrated by members of the local parish clergy every Sunday. An annual blessing of the graves takes place each summer as it has done since the foundation of the cemetery in 1832.

== In popular culture ==
Glasnevin Cemetery is the setting for the "Hades" episode in James Joyce's 1922 novel Ulysses, and is mentioned by Idris Davies in his poem Eire. Portions of the 1967 film Ulysses, directed by Joseph Strick, were filmed at Glasnevin Cemetery.

The gate of the cemetery, as well as the nearby pub John Kavanagh's 'The Gravediggers', were featured in the 1970 comedy film Quackser Fortune Has a Cousin in the Bronx.

Shane MacThomais, the cemetery's historian, was the author and contributor to a number of published works on the cemetery, prior to his death in March 2014.

The documentary One Million Dubliners was released in 2014, featuring stories about the history and operation of the cemetery.
