= Clay (short story) =

- Short story by James Joyce
- Country: Ireland
- Language: English
- Genre: short story

Publication
- Published in: Dubliners
- Publication type: Collection
- Media type: Print
- Publication date: 1914

Chronology
Counterparts	A Painful Case

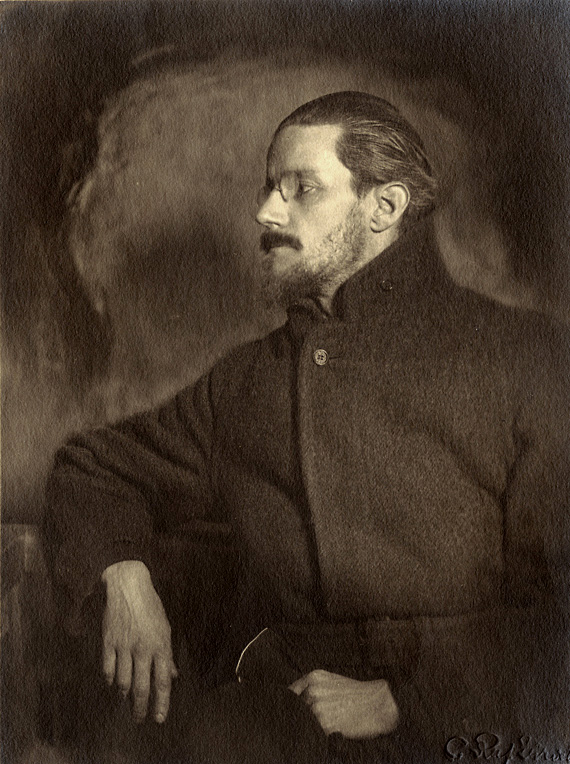
James Joyce c. 1918

"Clay" is a short story by James Joyce published in his 1914 collection Dubliners. It deals with the reflections of a middle-aged, unmarried woman during the course of her day.

== Plot ==
Maria, a tiny, middle-aged, well-loved, and peacemaking woman with a job in Dublin by Lamplight, a rescue mission for wayward women, is looking forward to a holiday evening at the house of Joe, whom she nursed when he was a boy, along with his brother Alphy, and of whom she is still very fond. She departs for Joe's after attending a tea service with her fellow laundresses, stopping to buy cakes for the Halloween party on the way. At the bakery, Maria is somewhat teased by the clerk, who asks whether she wishes to buy a wedding cake, mirroring a similar joke made at the earlier tea. On a tram, Maria has a bashful encounter with an elderly and drunken man who chats with her.

She is welcomed warmly at the house by Joe's family, but is saddened and ashamed to realize that she has left the plumcake she bought for Joe and his wife on the tram, probably due to "flirting" with the elderly man. Maria is soon enticed into playing a traditional Hallow Eve game with the children in which objects are placed in saucers and a blindfolded player has to pick among them. Each object is supposed to have a prophetic significance. One of the objects in the game is a ring, standing for marriage, which Maria failed to get during a similar game (in which objects were baked into pieces of barmbrack) back at the laundry. At Joe's, Maria once again misses the ring and instead chooses what is implied to be a lump of clay. Everyone goes quiet.

Maria is allowed to choose again, and this time fetches the prayer-book, indicating a life of spiritual vocation (service at a convent, suggests Joe's wife). After drinking some wine, Maria sings the aria "I Dreamt I Dwelt in Marble Halls" from the opera The Bohemian Girl by Michael Balfe. She makes what the text refers to as "a mistake" by singing the first verse twice, but nobody corrects her. She omits the second verse of the song; this omission is significant, as the missing verse imagines suitors the likes of whom Maria has not had:

I dreamt that suitors sought my hand,
That knights upon bended knee,
And with vows no maiden heart could withstand,
They pledg'd their faith to me.
And I dreamt that one of that noble host
Came forth my hand to claim;
But I also dreamt, which charm'd me most,
That you lov'd me still the same.

The story ends with a description of how Joe, who earlier was angry at Alphy but relented, has been "very much moved" by her song, so moved that he needs to ask his wife to find the corkscrew for him.

== Context ==
The story, like all others in Dubliners, was written in a time of religious and political turmoil in Ireland. The status of an unmarried woman of an advanced age was uncomfortable in the Dublin of the collection. The story refers several times to Maria's life of spinsterhood, devoted to others, with no hope of change. The title suggests that one of the children surreptitiously placed a lump of clay in one of the saucers from which the children have to choose their fate, representing death, meaning that the person will die soon. Alcoholism and its hold on Irish life is also repeatedly referenced. The narrator, through Maria's eyes, mistakenly confuses Joe's interest in further drinking with affection for her singing.
