= Counterparts (short story) =

Short story by James Joyce

- Short story by James Joyce
- Country: Ireland
- Language: English
- Genre: short story

Publication
- Published in: Dubliners
- Publication type: Collection
- Media type: Print
- Publication date: 1914

Chronology
A Little Cloud	Clay

"Counterparts" is a short story by James Joyce published in his 1914 collection Dubliners. The story follows a day in the life of an alcoholic scrivener who is unsuccessful in his professional and personal life.

== Plot ==
The story recounts an evening in the life of a man named Farrington, frequently referred to simply as "the man". Farrington's difficulties begin at his clerical job when his boss — whom he addresses as "Mr. Alleyne" — berates him for not having finished an assignment. Instead of applying himself immediately to the task, the alcoholic Farrington slips out of the office for a glass of porter. When Alleyne yells at Farrington again, Farrington replies with an impertinent remark and has to apologize. It becomes evident that Farrington's relationship with his superior has never been good, partly due to Alleyne's having overheard Farrington mocking his Ulster accent.

After work, Farrington pawns his watch-chain for drinking money and joins his friends for a night of drinking. Farrington's account of his standing up to his boss earns him some respect. However, his revelries end in two humiliations: a perceived slight by an elegant young woman and defeat in an arm-wrestling contest. Farrington goes home in a foul mood to discover that his wife is out at chapel. He tells his youngest son, Tom, to make dinner but the child had let the fire in the kitchen go out. Farrington's rage explodes and he starts beating the little child with a walking stick. The story ends with Tom pleading for mercy.

== Background and story title ==
For Joyce's contemporaneous audience, the term "counterparts" could be expected to suggest (hand-written) duplicate copies of legal documents. At the story's end, Farrington, “the man” is seen as the "counterpart" of Mr. Alleyne, his superior at his workplace, since he abuses his child at home, just as Mr. Alleyne abuses him at the office.
