= Two Gallants (short story) =

- Short story by James Joyce
- Country: Ireland
- Language: English
- Genre: short story

Publication
- Published in: Dubliners
- Publication type: Collection
- Media type: Print
- Publication date: 1914

Chronology
After the Race	The Boarding House

"Two Gallants" is a short story by James Joyce published in his 1914 collection Dubliners. It tells the story of two Irishmen who are frustrated with their lack of achievement in life and rely on the exploitation of others to live. Joyce considered the story to be one of the most important in Dubliners.

== Publication history ==
The London house of Grant Richards agreed to publish Dubliners in 1905, but there were printing complications and concerns of obscenity. One of the stories with passages in question was "Two Gallants." Joyce questioned Richard's reluctance to publish by asking: "Is it the small gold coin in the former story or the code of honour which the two gallants live by which shocks him?" In another letter to Richards, Joyce expressed his fondness for the story by writing: "to omit the story from the book would really be disastrous. It is one of the most important stories in the book. I would rather sacrifice five of the other stories (which I could name) than this one." Joyce redacted some words, but the story was kept in the collection, which was published by Richards nine years after Joyce submitted it in 1905.

== Plot summary ==
In the evening, a young man named Corley is walking with his friend Lenehan and telling him about a woman he has seduced. A rendezvous has been arranged between the woman and Corley, during which Lenehan wanders around Dublin before stopping at a refreshment house for a supper of peas and a bottle of ginger beer. During his solitude, Lenehan contemplates his current state; he is at the age of thirty-one, and is thoroughly unsatisfied with his life of leeching and "chasing the devil by his tail." He dreams of settling down with a "simple-minded" woman, who could provide him with money. After eating, Lenehan wanders around the streets aimlessly, hoping Corley will meet him at the previously arranged time. Corley presents him with a gold coin from the woman. The reader is never told how the woman acquired it, but it is implied that she either stole it from her employer on his behalf, or that it is the sum of her savings. This contrasts with Corley's descriptions of past relationships he had had, in which he spent money on women.
