= Susan Langstaff Mitchell =

Irish writer and poet

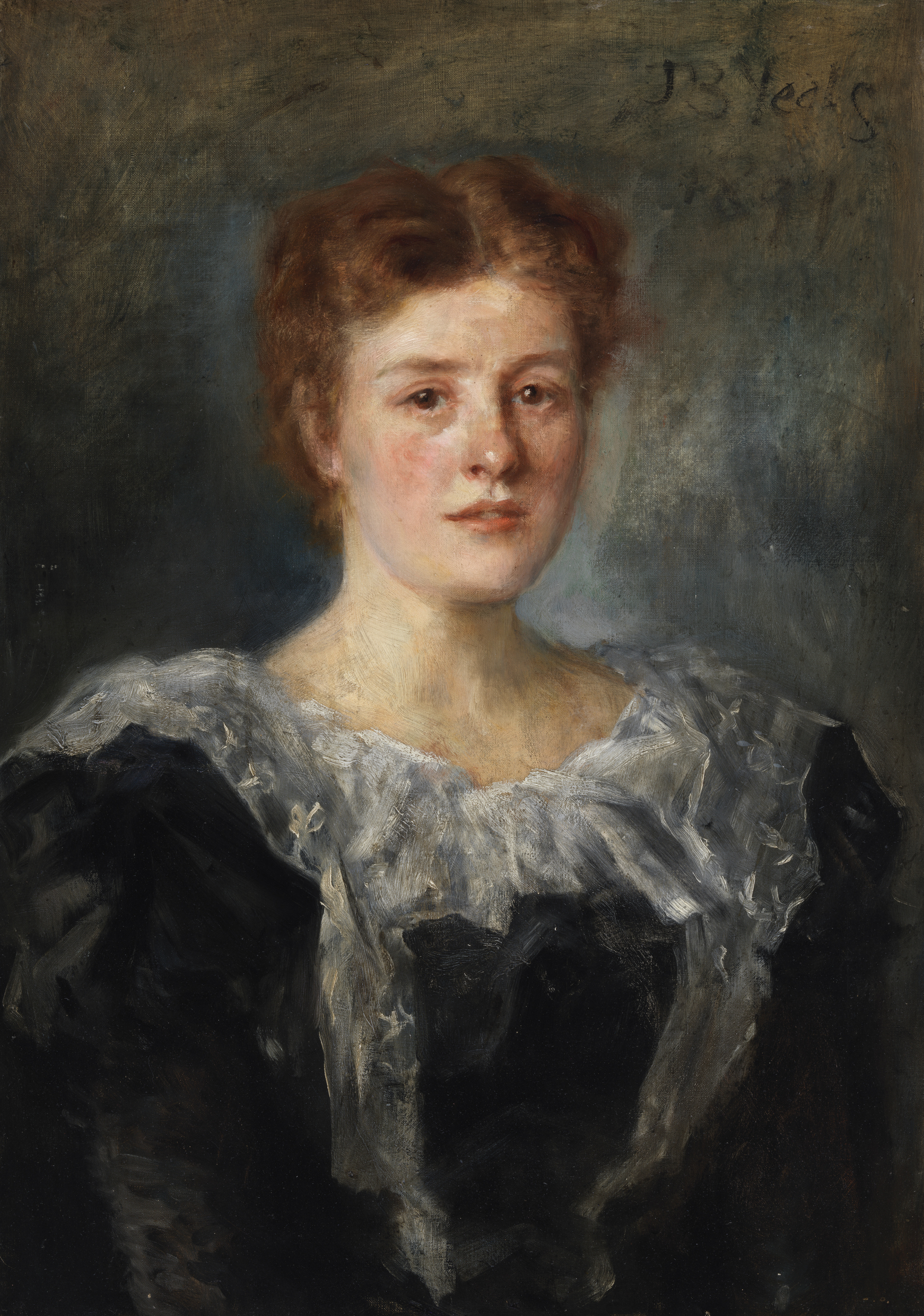
- by Jack Butler Yeats, 1899

Susan Langstaff Mitchell (5 December 1866 – 4 March 1926) was an Irish writer and poet, known for her satirical verse.

== Biography ==
Susan Langstaff Mitchell was born in Carrick-on-Shannon, County Leitrim, the fifth of seven children of Michael Thomas Mitchell and Kate (née Catherine Theresa Cullen. Her father was manager of the Provincial Bank there. He died when she was six years old and she was sent to Dublin to live with aunts on Dublin's Wellington Road, while her mother, Kate moved to Sligo to have her sons educated there. In Dublin, Mitchell lived next door to the artist Sarah Purser and her family, and she attended a private school on Morehampton Road run by Harriett Abbott. Mitchell later attended Trinity College Dublin, taking the TCD women's examination with honours.

In 1884, she moved to Birr, in Offaly, to be with her aunts but, although a Protestant, she soon rebelled against their unionist beliefs and became a supporter of Home Rule. During her visits to her mother in Sligo she encountered William Butler Yeats, and they quickly became friends. In 1897 she began teaching in Sligo, but it was an unhappy time for her as her fiancé George Douglas Crooke died and she was diagnosed with tuberculosis.

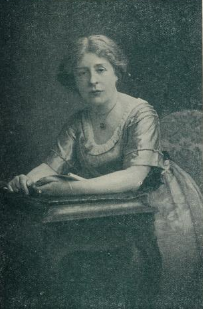
Susan Langstaff Mitchell

In 1899, she travelled to London for treatment of a hearing problem associated with tuberculosis. While there, she stayed with the Yeats family, and sat for her portrait painted by John B. Yeats.

The illness was to remain with her all of her life. After her return to Dublin she worked as a journalist and became assistant editor of the Irish Homestead, under George Russell. Thus began a close friendship and professional relationship that would last until her death. She contributed essays, reviews, drama notes and poems, many pseudonymously. Her poems first appeared in the holiday feature of the Homestead each year, entitled "A Celtic Christmas." Some of her lyrics were contained in New Songs (1904), a collection edited by Russell which also contained pieces by Padraic Colum and Alice Milligan.

A ballad which she wrote in 1905, "The Ballad of Shawe-Taylor and Hugh Lane", dealing with a controversy involving Hugh Lane, was described by Thomas Bodkin as "a delicious comic ballad, which she sang herself, in a pleasant throaty voice, at many gatherings in Dublin drawing-rooms and studios." She became acquainted with William Butler Yeats, Padraic Colum, George Moore and others. She also contributed verse for several cards produced by the Cuala Press between 1909 and 1946, some of which are held at the National Library of Ireland. Although she always had a touch of humour in her writing, she wrote a book-length study of Moore and his work that was not a little acerbic.

She lived with her sister Jane, an actress, and mother in Rathgar. Her mother dictated her memoirs to her, which were later published. She published her first book of poems, Aids to the Immortality of Certain Persons in Ireland, in 1908. Its most successful piece was a parody of Rudyard Kipling's Recessional, entitled "Ode to the British Empire". This book was re-issued in an enlarged edition in 1913, followed by The Living Chalice.

From 1923, she was sub-editor at the Irish Statesman, again under George Russell. In the last two and a half years of her life, she wrote over two hundred pieces for this publication. She died 4 March 1926 age 60 from cancer. She was buried in Mount Jerome Cemetery.

== Legacy ==
- In 2016, a monument was erected in Carrick-on-Shannon, County Leitrim to commemorate the 150th anniversary of her birth, and the 90th anniversary of her death.

== Selected works ==
- 1907, The Abbey Row (contributor)
- 1908, Aids to the immortality of certain persons in Ireland charitably administered
- 1908, The living chalice and other poems
- 1912, Frankinscense and myrrh
- 1916, George Moore
- 1918, Secret springs of Dublin song (contributor)
