= A Little Cloud =

- Short story by James Joyce
- Country: Ireland
- Language: English
- Genre: short story

Publication
- Published in: Dubliners
- Publication type: Collection
- Media type: Print
- Publication date: 1914

Chronology
The Boarding House	Counterparts

"A Little Cloud" is a short story by James Joyce, first published in his 1914 collection Dubliners. It contrasts the life of the protagonist, Little Chandler, a Dubliner, who remained in the city and married, with the life of his old friend Ignatius Gallaher, who had left Ireland to find success and excitement as a journalist and bachelor in London.

== Characters ==
- Thomas Malone Chandler, an aspiring poet known by the nickname Little Chandler
- Ignatius Gallaher, a boisterous travelling journalist
- Annie Chandler, Little Chandler's wife
- Unnamed child Chandler (of Little Chandler and Annie Chandler)

== Summary ==
The story follows Thomas Malone Chandler, or "Little Chandler" as he is known, through a portion of his day. The story begins in medias res through Little Chandler's life when he is at work, where he cannot focus because he is preoccupied with the thought of a visit later that day. He anxiously awaits this visit with his old friend Ignatius Gallaher. Gallaher is now a "brilliant figure" in the London Press and Little Chandler has not seen him in eight years. As Little Chandler thinks about his old friend and the success that has come to him, he begins to reflect upon his own life. This reflection gives the reader insight to Little Chandler's character. The reader sees Little Chandler as a mere observer of life, a reluctant character. He is timid, because he enjoys poetry yet is too "shy" to read it to his wife.

Little Chandler likes to think that he himself could have been a writer if only he had put his mind to it. All of the "different moods and impressions he wished to express in verse" could still be achieved if he could just express himself. But as much as Little Chandler covers up his true feelings with these thoughts that seem to "comfort" him, the reader can see past this.

These feelings are more clearly exposed to the reader in the bar where Little Chandler actually meets Gallaher. Here, Gallaher tells enchanting stories of his vast traveling. His life is the exact opposite of Little Chandler's and Little Chandler begins to feel that his wife is holding him back from success as a result of Gallaher's glorification of his travels and freedoms. Without his wife, without his little boy, he would be free to prosper. Deep envy sets into Little Chandler. It seems as though the more they drink, and the longer they talk, the more inferior Chandler feels. Still, he tries to hide his envy of Gallaher's life by saying how one day Gallaher will get married and start a family too.

Joyce shifts the scene to Little Chandler's home. We find Little Chandler with his child in his arms. He is sitting at a table looking at a picture of his wife, Annie. He looks into her eyes searching for answers to his now confused state of mind. All he finds is coldness. He sees a pretty girl, but he can see no life in her, and he compares her unfavourably to the rich, exotic women Gallaher says are available to him. He wonders why he married Annie. He then opens a book of Byron's poetry and begins to read On the Death of a Young Lady until the child begins to cry and Little Chandler finds he cannot comfort him. Little Chandler snaps at his son. The frightened baby cries harder and harder until Annie comes. Through her interaction with Little Chandler and the child, it becomes apparent that Little Chandler is not her main priority.

Little Chandler feels trapped. All feelings of hope that existed at the beginning of the day are now gone. It is at this moment that Little Chandler reaches a deep moment of recognition. He finally sees the truth that the reader has known all along. His own reluctance is the only thing responsible for his feelings of incompleteness, and he can now only blame himself. Tears come to Little Chandler's eyes, and the story is cut off.

== Analysis ==
And it came to pass at the seventh time, that he said, Behold, there ariseth a little cloud out of the sea, like a man's hand. And he said, Go up, say unto Ahab, Prepare thy chariot, and get thee down that the rain stop thee not.

— I Kings 18:44 King James Version (KJV)

In an analysis of "A Little Cloud", Harold Mosher wrote that, in Dubliners, Joyce uses, and perhaps abuses, both repetition and cliché in order to give the writing a feeling of insignificance. He pointed out there is a legitimate lack of action in many of the stories, certainly in "A Little Cloud", and this "content of lack" is mirrored by the language Joyce used. Mosher believes the talking about nothing, in the way that many Joyce characters do, is actually rather important, and argued that, in terms of the language, this style actually portrays an abundance of creativity and quality, rather than the lack of fresh thought that could be implied by the cliché nature of the writing. Thematically, Mosher said this is important in an ironic way, because, though it shows creativity on the part of Joyce, it shows little on the part of Chandler: he thinks and speaks in this way because, as he says in the end to Annie, he "couldn't... didn't do anything".

It’s been remarked that "a central theme" of Dubliners is expressed in Little Chandler's conclusion that "If you wanted to succeed you had to go away."

=== Title ===
Thomas O'Grady has argued that the somewhat ambiguous title "A Little Cloud" can be attributed to William Blake's "Infant Sorrow". He points out that Blake was an influential artist for Joyce and that Joyce gave a lecture on Blake once. O'Grady believes this connection is logical, because it lends structural and thematic significance to the title. This story is Little Chandler's "song of experience" according to O'Grady because the "infant hope" carried by Chandler's child is overwhelmed with the sorrow and remorse he feels.

Terence Brown, meanwhile, has suggested that the title may be an allusion to the Biblical tale of Elijah and the prophets of Baal and, more particularly, to I Kings 18:44.
