= Grace (short story) =

- Short story by James Joyce
- Country: Ireland
- Language: English
- Genre: short story

Publication
- Published in: Dubliners
- Publication type: Collection
- Media type: Print
- Publication date: 1914

Chronology
A Mother	The Dead

"Grace" is a short story by James Joyce written toward the end of 1905 and published in his 1914 collection Dubliners.

== Plot summary ==
The story begins with a man unconscious after falling down the stairs in a pub after heavy drinking. A friend of his, Mr. Power, finds him, reveals he is named Tom Kernan, and takes him home to his wife. Kernan is a salesman who once possessed an easy charm and manner but has since descended into alcoholism. An injury to his tongue sustained during the fall keeps Kernan in bed.

Two days later, he is visited by his friends Power, M'Coy, and Cunningham. The friends have concocted a plan to get Kernan to attend a Catholic retreat with them. The four discuss many matters and finally settle upon religion. The friends mention attending a confessional retreat at a Jesuit church and invite Kernan along. He does not respond to the idea at first. The conversation shows a superficial understanding of the Catholic faith, and the friends make many comical errors about the Church.

The scene shifts to the Jesuit church in Gardiner Street where all listen to a priest's sermon.

== Analysis ==
Kernan's gin-drinking in the novel Ulysses (which is set on 16 June 1904) indicates the failure of his friends' plan. Hugh Kenner found "Grace" "as subversive a story as any Dubliners contains: the story against which Irish Catholic opinion should have expended its animus". According to Stanislaus Joyce, the three parts of the story recall the tripartite structure of Dante's Divine Comedy ("inferno-purgatorio-paradiso"). The word "grace" is used in each part, but not in the religious sense until the last sentence of the story, and it has been argued that Joyce initially suppresses the doctrine only to have it equated with a business practice by a priest in a church, to ridicule the belief that divine grace is available there.
