= Araby (short story) =

1914 short story by James Joyce

- Short story by James Joyce
- Country: Ireland
- Language: English
- Genre: Short story

Publication
- Published in: Dubliners
- Publication type: Collection
- Media type: Print (Hardback)
- Publication date: 1914

Chronology
An Encounter	Eveline

"Araby" is a short story by James Joyce published as the third entry in his 1914 collection Dubliners. The story traces a young boy's infatuation with his friend's sister.

== Characters ==
- A young boy, protagonist and narrator
- Mangan's sister, object of his infatuation
- Mangan
- The boy's friends
- The boy's uncle
- The boy's aunt
- Mrs Mercer
- Shopkeepers at Araby
- Customers at Araby

The story is unique in that almost no characters are specifically named.

== Plot ==
Through first-person narration, the reader is immersed at the start of the story in the drab life that people live on North Richmond Street, which seems to be illuminated only by the verve and imagination of the children who, despite the growing darkness that comes during the winter months, insist on playing "until [their] bodies glowed". Even though the conditions of this neighbourhood leave much to be desired, the children's play is infused with their almost magical way of perceiving the world, which the narrator dutifully conveys to the reader:

Our shouts echoed in the silent street. The career of our play brought us through the dark muddy lanes behind the houses where we ran the gauntlet of the rough tribes from the cottages, to the back doors of the dark dripping gardens where odours arose from the ashpits, to the dark odorous stables where a coachman smoothed and combed the horse or shook music from the buckled harness.

But though these boys "career" around the neighbourhood in a very childlike way, they are also aware of and interested in the adult world, as represented by their spying on the narrator's uncle as he comes home from work and, more importantly, on Mangan's sister, whose dress "swung as she moved" and whose "soft rope of hair tossed from side to side". These boys are on the brink of sexual awareness and, awed by the mystery of another sex, are hungry for knowledge.

On one rainy evening, the boy secludes himself in a soundless, dark drawing-room and gives his feelings for her full release: "I pressed the palms of my hands together until they trembled, murmuring: O love! O love! many times." This scene is the culmination of the narrator's increasingly romantic idealization of Mangan's sister. By the time he actually speaks to her, he has built up such an unrealistic idea of her that he can barely put sentences together: "When she addressed the first words to me I was so confused that I did not know what to answer. She asked me if I was going to Araby. I forget whether I answered yes or no." But the narrator recovers splendidly: when Mangan's sister dolefully states that she will not be able to go to Araby, he gallantly offers to bring something back for her.

The narrator now cannot wait to go to the Araby bazaar and procure for his beloved some grand gift that will endear him to her. And though his aunt frets, hoping that it is not "some Freemason affair", and though his uncle, perhaps intoxicated, perhaps stingy, arrives so late from work and equivocates so much that he almost keeps the narrator from being able to go, the intrepid yet frustrated narrator heads out of the house, tightly clenching a florin, in spite of the late hour, toward the bazaar.

But the Araby market turns out not to be the fantastic place he had hoped it would be. It is late; most of the stalls are closed. The only sound is "the fall of the coins" as men count their money. Worst of all, however, is the vision of sexuality—of his future—that he receives when he stops at one of the few remaining open stalls. The young woman minding the stall is engaged in a conversation with two young men. Though he is potentially a customer, she only grudgingly and briefly waits on him before returning to her frivolous conversation. His idealized vision of Araby is destroyed, along with his idealized vision of Mangan's sister—and of love: "Gazing up into the darkness I saw myself as a creature driven and derided by vanity; and my eyes burned with anguish and anger."

== Themes ==
William York Tindall, noting the story's religious allusions, and finding in its ending the suggestion of an emptying church, sees the boy's journey to Araby as a futile quest for Ireland's Church. Another critic, expanding on the idea, has argued that Joyce drew upon the Church's iconography to depict Mangan's sister and its liturgy to render the bazaar's closing, and that the story should be read as a parody of the Eucharist akin to "The Sisters".

== Romantic elements ==
In "The Structure of 'Araby'", Jerome Mandel notes the shared plot archetypes between "Araby" and traditional medieval romantic literature, positing that Joyce deliberately "structured with rigorous precision upon a paradigm of medieval romance". There is also an intermingling of romantic motifs with religious symbolism. When Mangan's sister ultimately talked to the narrator, "The light from the lamp opposite our door caught the white curve of her neck, lit up her hair that rested there and, falling, lit up the hand..." indicating that a part of her remained in the dark while her neck, hair and hands lit up. This is an allusion to several images of Madonna or the Virgin Mary where she is partially illuminated.

== Later influence ==
Among later writers influenced by "Araby" was John Updike, whose oft-anthologized short story "A&P" is a 1960s American reimagining of Joyce's tale of a young man, lately the wiser for his frustrating infatuation with a beautiful but inaccessible girl. Her allure has excited him into confusing his emergent sexual impulses for those of honor and chivalry, and brought about disillusionment and a loss of innocence.

== Media adaptations ==
- In 1985, the Austin, Texas-based alternative rock group The Reivers released their Translate Slowly album, whose lead track "Araby" was a literary adaptation of the story.
- In 1999, a short film adaptation of "Araby" was produced and directed by Dennis Courtney with screenplay by Joseph Bierman.
