= After the Race =

1914 short story by James Joyce

- Short story by James Joyce
- Country: Ireland
- Language: English
- Genre: short story

Publication
- Published in: Dubliners
- Publication type: Collection
- Media type: Print
- Publication date: 1914

Chronology
Eveline	Two Gallants

"After the Race" is a short story by James Joyce published in his 1914 collection Dubliners. The story had appeared under his pseudonym Stephen Daedalus before it was dropped by Irish Homestead for not being proper for the magazine's readership. After "Eveline", it is the second shortest story in the collection.

== The story ==
As many flashy cars drive toward Dublin, crowds gather and cheer. A race has just finished, and though the French have placed second and third after the German–Belgian team, the local sightseers loudly support them. Jimmy Doyle rides in one of the cars with his wealthy French friend, Charles Ségouin, whom he met while studying at Cambridge. Two other men ride with them as well: Ségouin's Canadian cousin, André Rivière, and a Hungarian pianist, Villona. Driving back into Dublin, the young men rejoice about the victory, and Jimmy enjoys the prestige of the ride. He fondly thinks about his recent investment in Ségouin's motor-company business venture, a financial backing that his father, a successful butcher, approves and supports. Jimmy savors the notoriety of being surrounded by and seen with such glamorous company, and in such a luxurious car.

Ségouin drops Jimmy and Villona off in Dublin so they can return to Jimmy's home, where Villona is staying, to change into formal dress for dinner at Ségouin's hotel. Jimmy's proud parents dote on their smartly dressed and well-connected son. At the dinner, the reunited party joins an Englishman, Routh, and conversation energetically moves from music to cars to politics, under the direction of Ségouin. Jimmy, turning to Irish–English relations, rouses an angry response from Routh, but Ségouin expertly snuffs any potential for argument with a toast.

After the meal, the young men stroll through Dublin and run into another acquaintance, an American named Farley, who invites them to his yacht. The party grows merrier, and they sing a French marching song as they make their way to the harbor. Once on board, the men proceed to dance and drink as Villona plays the piano. Jimmy makes a speech that his companions loudly applaud, and then the men settle down to play cards. Drunk and giddy, Jimmy plays game after game, losing more and more money. He yearns for the playing to stop, but goes along nevertheless. A final game leaves Routh the champion. Even as the biggest loser alongside Farley, Jimmy's spirits never dwindle. He knows he will feel remorse the next day, but assures himself of his happiness just as Villona opens the cabin door and announces that daybreak has come.

== Themes ==
At the beginning of the story, before the characters are introduced, the cars speed through Inchicore, and the writer's own voice remarks that "through this channel of poverty and inaction the Continent sped its wealth and industry" and the Irish onlookers raise "the cheer of the gratefully oppressed."

Motor cars at the early 1900s were generally considered a luxury item, here serving as the symbol of the richer, wider world beyond the confines of backward Ireland. The protagonist Jimmy Doyle seeks to enter this wider cosmopolitan society and carve an equal place for himself, but this ends in failure: he finds himself out of his depth, becomes drunk and unable to keep track of the card game, and ends up losing heavily to the Englishman, Routh, whom he earlier challenged. The story can thus be seen as skeptical about the aspirations of Irish nationalism to make an independent Ireland the equal of other countries.
