= A Mother =

1914 short story by James Joyce

- Short story by James Joyce
- Country: Ireland
- Language: English
- Genre: Short story

Publication
- Published in: Dubliners
- Publication type: Short story collection
- Media type: Print (Hardback & Paperback)
- Publication date: 1914

Chronology
| Ivy Day in the Committee Room | Grace |

"A Mother" is a short story by James Joyce published in his 1914 collection Dubliners. The story centers around a mother who secures a role for her daughter in a series of concerts.

== Plot summary ==
The story starts with a brief description of Mr. Holohan, who works for an Irish cultural society and has been arranging a series of concerts. Holohan's bad leg is a prominent feature. We are then introduced to Mrs. Kearney, who was very accomplished at a young age but found that the young men of her class were intimidated by her, which prompted her to marry the working class Mr. Kearney "out of spite." Her daughter Kathleen goes to good schools and learns to play the piano. Mrs. Kearney decides to use the Irish Revival as a means of improving the family's social position. She is successful enough that Kathleen gets the attention of Holohan, who hires the girl as an accompanist at four vocal concerts put on by his society. Holohan and Mrs. Kearney develop a flirtatious relationship as Mrs. Kearney takes on the planning of the performances due to Holohan's inability.

The first concert is sparsely attended after the society decides it has got in over its head and shuffled around Mrs. Kearney's plan so that all the talent will perform at the final concert only. The second one has more patrons, but Mrs. Kearney is bothered by the behaviour of the audience and the casual attitude of the society's secretary, Mr. Fitzpatrick. The third concert is cancelled. Mrs. Kearney is concerned that her daughter will not be paid the full contracted price but is unable to get a straight answer on the matter from Holohan or Fitzpatrick. She brings her husband to the final concert, anticipating a confrontation.

On the night of the final concert, Mrs. Kearney is unable to get a proper answer on her request for full payment and insists her daughter will not play until paid. The dispute holds up the beginning of the performance until Fitzpatrick pays Mrs. Kearney less than half the agreed amount, promising the rest at the interval. Although the first half of the concert is successful, the description of the performers, either too immature or past their prime, is not flattering. At the interval, Mrs. Kearney is told the rest of the money will be paid in three days. An indignant Mrs. Kearney refuses to let her daughter play. Another accompanist is found, and Mrs. Kearney and her family, roundly condemned by all at this point, leave. The story presents the mother's briefly rekindled romantic ideals dashed by the ineptitude and condescension of the society's members.
