= Araby (1999 film) =

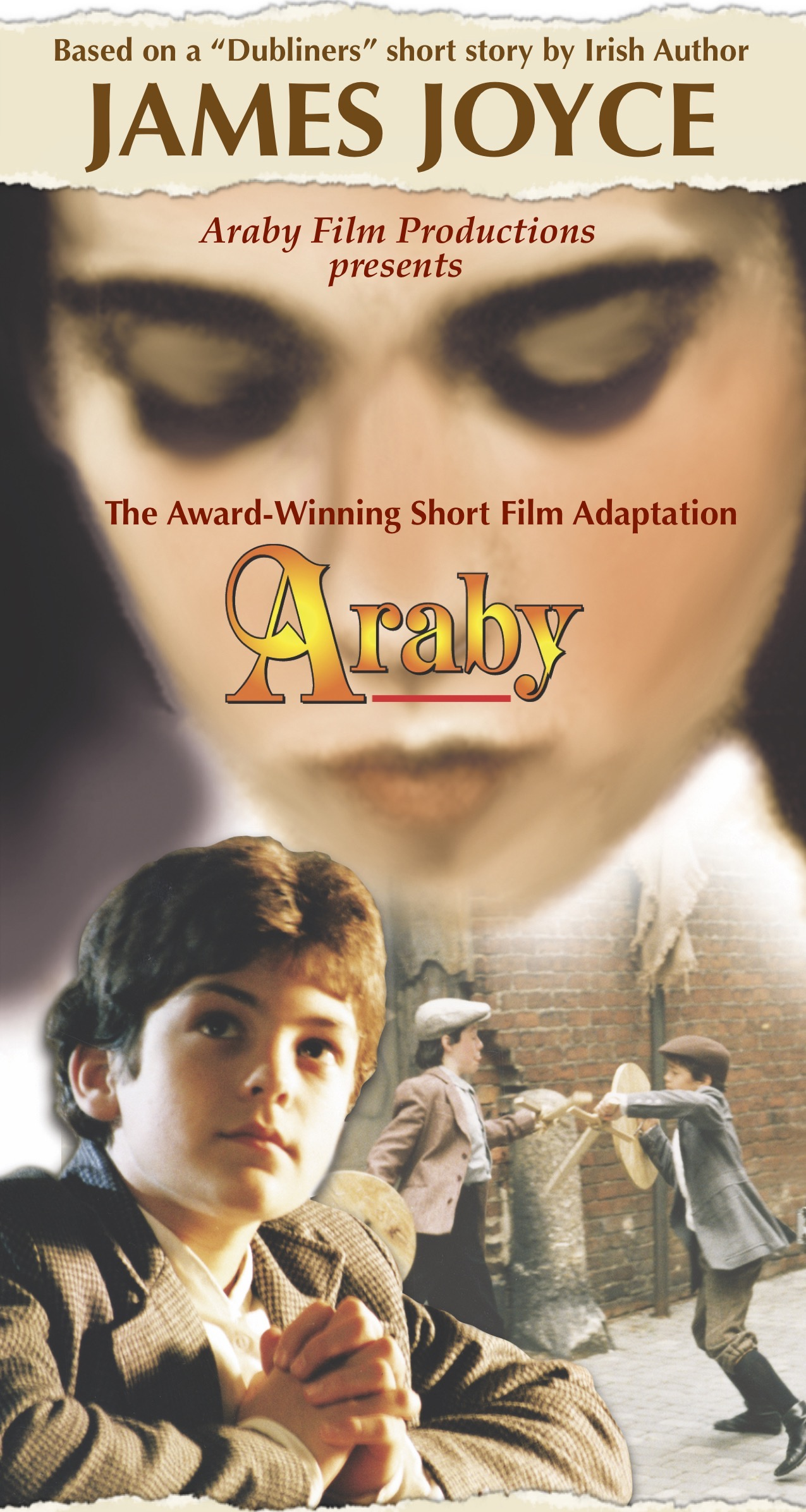
- Film Poster
- Directed by: Dennis Courtney
- Screenplay by: Dennis Courtney; Joseph Bierman
- Based on: Araby by James Joyce
- Starring: Van Hughes; Joanna Canton
- Narrated by: James Turner
- Cinematography: Ron Baldwin
- Edited by: Dennis Courtney; Joseph Bierman
- Music by: Seamaisin; Kila
- Release date: May 24, 1999
- Running time: 21 minutes
- Country: United States
- Language: English

Araby is an independent short film directed by Dennis Courtney, starring Van Hughes. It was adapted from the short story "Araby" by James Joyce, which was included in his short works collection Dubliners.

== Plot ==
Based on the short story by Irish author James Joyce, Araby is the bittersweet tale of a young boy's confused affection for his friend's older sister. Taught by Jesuits in turn-of-the-century Dublin, and raised in a strict Catholic family, the boy worships her from afar. When she finally notices him, the girl expresses her sadness in not being able to attend the enchanting Araby bazaar. The boy nobly sets out to attain a gift for the girl, but instead meets with a harsh revelation. The boy's romantic quest through the streets of Dublin becomes a religious pilgrimage, merging the sensual and the sacred.

== Film adaptation ==
The filmmakers make several adroit additions to Joyce's text, including an episode in the schoolroom where a Christian Brother instructs the boys about the young martyr Tarsicius, whose exploit of carrying the Eucharist to Christian prisoners in Rome is only alluded to in Joyce's text. In fact, Tarsicius is not even named in the story when the narrator records: “I bore my chalice safely through a throng of foes." A second emendation is the expansion of the role of Mrs. Mercer, whom Joyce only mentioned in the story. In the film she confers with the protagonist's aunt over the tea-table. For this dialogue, missing from the "Araby" text, the filmmakers went to ‘‘The Sisters,’’ the first story in Dubliners, as well as utilizing narration from "Araby" itself. Another significant change from the story in the handling of the Caroline Norton poem ‘‘The Arab's Farewell to His Steed.’’ Joyce merely alludes to the poem, but in the film, the uncle in voice-over recites lines from it, which indisputably link the verses with the young man as he races down Buckingham Street to the special train at Westland Row Station that will take him to Araby.

== Production ==
The production was completed in 8 days with a cast and crew of 40 people and a budget of $30,000. It was filmed in Richmond, Virginia, Portsmouth, Virginia, New Hope, Pennsylvania and Asbury Park, New Jersey. Seamaisin, a group of musicians from University of Notre Dame recorded traditional Irish music for the film and the Dublin-based traditional group Kila also provided two songs for the soundtrack.

== Cast and crew ==
- Executive Producer: Andrew Quicke
- Producer/Director: Dennis Courtney
- Adaptation: Dennis Courtney & Joseph Bierman
- Director of Photography: Ron Baldwin
- Production Designer: Charles Currier & William English
- Art Direction: Ammee Copper
- Costumes: Michael Klefeker
- Editing: Dennis Courtney & Joseph Bierman
- Music: Seamaisin & Kila
- Cast: Van Michael Hughes, Joanna Canton, Gillette Elvgren, Mimi Eisman, Mary Christine Danner
- Narrator: James Turner

== Reception ==
The Irish Edition wrote, "The film subtly reveals the deep feelings that weave their way through the boy's consciousness, from his romantic preoccupation with the girl, the initial hope and anticipation of receipt of the money from his uncle so he can buy a gift and on through to the ultimate failure of his efforts. Joyce would be absolutely delighted with the beauty and magical power of this 21-minute film." “The filmmakers tell the story in a cinematic language that is brisk and impressionistic - like the experiences of a child - but pensive and mature at the same time.” “The film ultimately helps us to get at what Joyce critic Donald Torchiana calls the "mythic, religious and legendary patterns that Joyce seems to place so frequently at the very center of each story".”

== Awards ==
- 1999 Academy of Motion Picture Arts and Sciences - Student Academy Awards - Regional Winner and Finalist
- 2000 Producer Guild of America - Santa Clarita Film Festival - Grand Award Drama
- 2000 Broadcast Education Association - BEA 2000 - 1st Place Narrative Award
- 2000 Saguaro Film Festival - Favorite Short Award
- 2000 Angelus Awards - Mole-Richard Award
- 2000 Hardacre Film Festival - Best Student Film
- 2000 Magnolia Film Festival - Best Short - 2nd Place
- 2000 Cine Eagle Award
- 2000 Atlantic City Film Festival
- 2000 Burbank Intl. Film Festival
- 2000 Rochester Intl. Film Festival
- 1996 Virginia Museum of Fine Arts Graduate Fellowship Grant
