= Lenehan and Corley =

Characters appearing in works by James Joyce

Lenehan and Corley appear in at least two works by James Joyce:

- In the story "Two Gallants" from Dubliners

Lenehan:

- In the "Aeolus", "The Wandering Rocks" "Sirens", "Cyclops", "Oxen of the Sun" and "Circe" episodes of Ulysses

Corley:

- In the "Eumaeus" episode of Ulysses

Lenehan, as well as being described as a 'leech', is a writer of 'flimsies' (horse racing tip sheets) and apparently does some freelance journalist hack work, notably at the Freeman's Journal newspaper. He considers himself witty.

Corley (who pronounces his name 'Horley') is of an undefined occupation. He is shown in "Two Gallants" to be conning an infatuated servant girl out of money, possibly her master's, and also may be a police informer (Joyce is deliberately obscure on this point). Frequently short of money, he is prepared to beg.

The two are friends, with Lenehan appearing as the remora to Corley's shark in "Two Gallants".
