= Ivy Day (Ireland) =

Irish holiday

- Observed by: Ireland
- Date: 6 October
- Frequency: annual

Ivy Day (Irish: Lá an Eidhneáin) was formerly observed on 6 October in Ireland, in memory of the prominent nationalist politician Charles Stewart Parnell who died on that date in 1891. James Joyce's short story "Ivy Day in the Committee Room" features several Irish canvassers discussing Parnell's memory.

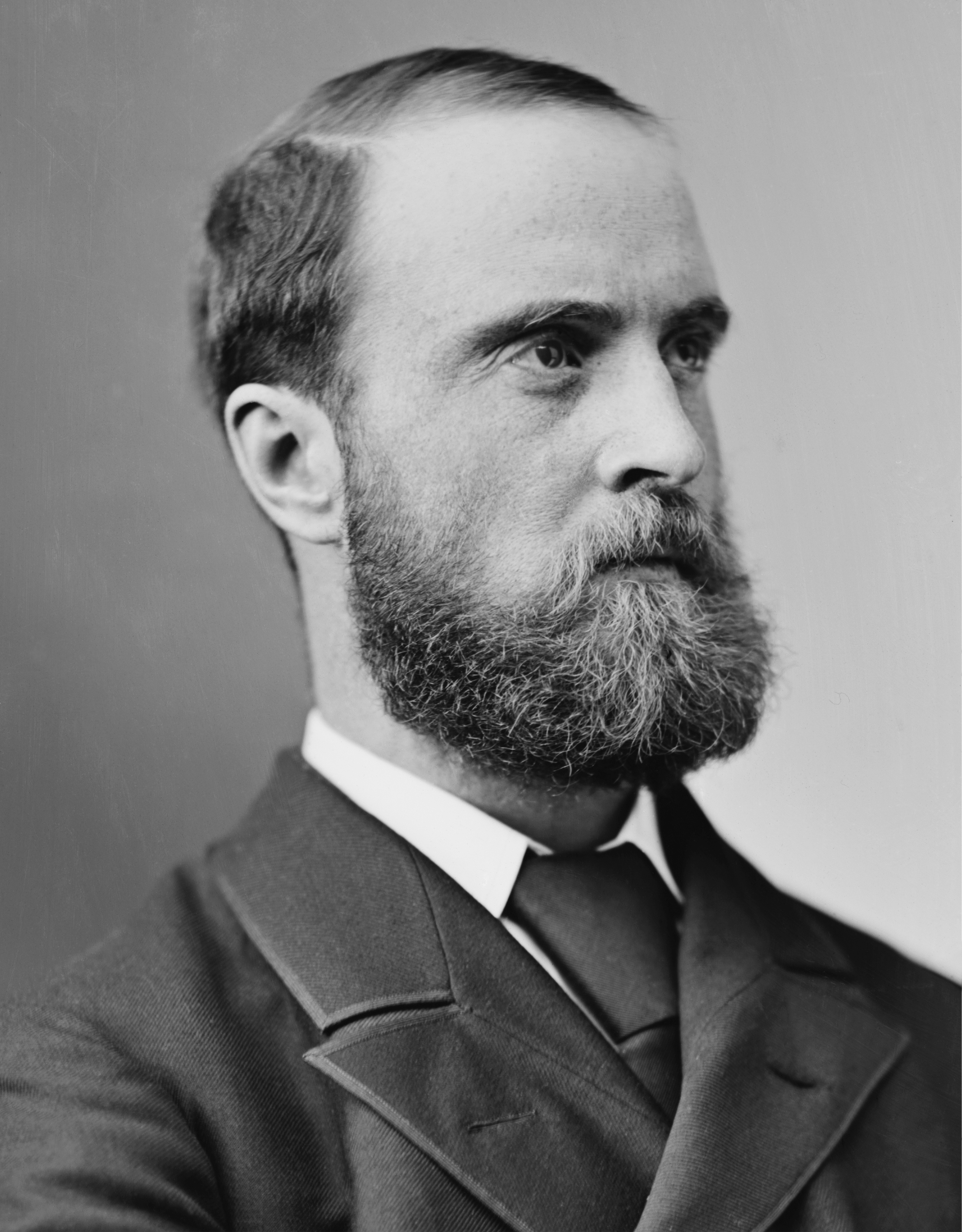
Charles Stewart Parnell

A report of the 6 October 1900 procession from central Dublin past the foundation stone of the yet-incomplete Parnell Monument to Glasnevin Cemetery described the scene at the grave:

As the cemetery was approached, the bands substituted dirgeful music for the National airs which they had been playing. At Glasnevin there was a period of great impressiveness as the procession filed round the Parnell circle, the crowds standing round remaining with their hands uncovered. The grave itself was in very good order. Numerous wreaths and other floral offerings of tasteful design were freshly deposited on it, although there were by no means the same abundance of these tributes that was noticeable in previous years.

A small ceremony still takes place at Parnell's graveside in Glasnevin Cemetery on the Sunday nearest 6 October. It is attended by a small number of devotees of Parnell and a brief oration is delivered in his honour at midday.
