= The Bohemian Girl (short story) =

1912 short story by Willa Cather

- Short story by Willa Cather
- Country: United States
- Language: English
- Genre: Short story

Publication
- Published in: McClure's
- Publication type: Magazine
- Publication date: August 1912

"The Bohemian Girl" is a short story by Willa Cather. It was written when Cather was living in Cherry Valley, New York, with Isabelle McClung whilst Alexander's Bridge was being serialised in McClure's. It was first published in McClure's in August 1912.

== Plot summary ==
Nils Ericson gets off a train in his hometown. He gets a ride in a carriage to his family home, where his mother greets him after many years apart. He goes for a walk with his little brother, Eric. The next day, the two brothers talk about Lou Sandberg's suicide - Nils dismisses the old man for his folly.

Nils visits Clara, who asks him if he has the second will his father wrote that bequeathed him some land. His mother drives him home and expresses her disapproval of Clara's father, Joe, for being a saloon-keeper. Later, Clara meets Nils outside the saloon. He tells her he came back to see her because he loves her. She gallops off. Some time later, her father invites her and Nils along for wine and music. Later, at the Ericsons's barnraising, Nils follows Clara down to the cellar, then dances with her and says they should run away together. On her way back home from her father's one night, the two lovers run away.

A year after the couple's departure, Eric is on a train bound for New York City where he is to board a ship to join his brother and Clara in Bergen, Norway. Nils has been corresponding with Clara's father, Joe. However, Eric decides to stop at Red Oak, Iowa and return home to his mother, as he doesn't want to leave her alone in the house. Once he is back, she says she has been milking the cows instead of asking a local boy to do the job for her: she did not want people to talk. Mother and son are happily reunited.

== Characters ==
- Nils Ericson
- The agent at the train station
- A driver in a carriage
- Preacher Ericson, Nils' late father
- Lady Ericson, Nil's mother
- Olaf Ericson, Cousin Henrick's son's guardian. He farms his land and 'puts the proceeds out at compound interest for them'.
- Mrs Otto
- Hilda
- Eric, Nils' little brother
- Cousin Henrick
- Peter
- Anders
- Lou Sandberg, a local who committed suicide
- Clara Olaf, Olaf's wife. Her maiden name is Vavrika. She doesn't get out of bed until 8 a.m., which is considered late in this community.
- Johanna Vavrika, Clara's aunt, fifty years old
- Joe Vavrika, a saloon-keeper and Clara's father
- Evelina Oleson, a girl who went to school with Nils and Clara
- Peter Oleson
- Yense Nelson
- Eli Swanson
- Nick Hermanson
- Fritz Sweiheart, a German carpenter
- Olena Yenson
- Fritz Oberlie

== Allusions to other works ==
- The Bible is briefly mentioned.
- Cather included lines from Michael Balfe's The Bohemian Girl.

== Literary significance and criticism ==
It has been suggested that the story was influenced by Gustave Flaubert's Madame Bovary, as the barn-raising bears similarities to the wedding scene in Flaubert's novel.
