= The Irish Homestead =

Publication of the Irish Agricultural Organisation Society, 1895 to 1918

Irish Homestead
- Front page, 9 January 1904
- Categories: agriculture, country living, self-help
- Frequency: weekly
- First issue: 1895
- Final issue: 1918 (amalgamated with the Irish Statesman)
- Country: Ireland
- Based in: Dublin
- Language: English

The Irish Homestead was the weekly publication of the Irish Agricultural Organisation Society (IAOS). It was founded in 1895 by Horace Plunkett.

== History ==
The aim of the paper was to publicise and propagate the objectives of the IAOS, which set up dairy co-operative societies and co-operative banks, and introduced co-operation among Irish farmers by proving the benefits obtainable through more economical and efficient management. Its headquarters were initially in the IAOS building in Dublin, 84 Merrion Square. The newspaper's first editor was Thomas A. Finlay, followed by T. P. Gill and H. F. Norman. In 1905, George William Russell became editor. A major contributor of articles and essays was Susan L. Mitchell, who became assistant editor. It was the first publication to publish James Joyce, with his short story "The Sisters" in 1904.

It ceased publication in 1918, but was afterwards revived in October 1921. In 1923 it was amalgamated with the Irish Statesman, and in this format it continued, under the editorship of George William Russell, until 1930.

== References and sources ==
=== Sources ===
- Barbara Hayley and Enda McKay (ed.), Three Hundred Years of Irish Periodicals, Dublin : Lilliput Press, 1987
