= Dubliners =

1914 short story collection by James Joyce

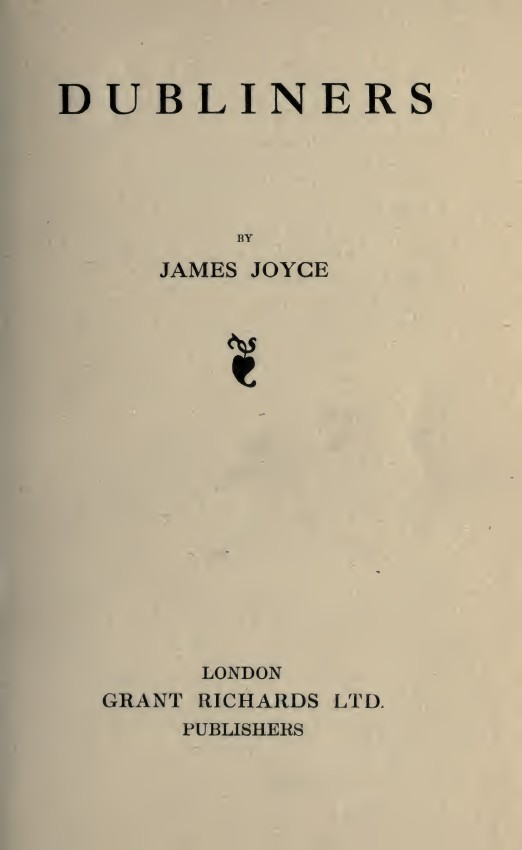
- Title page of the 1914 first edition of Dubliners
- Author: James Joyce
- Language: English
- Genre: Short story collection
- Publisher: Grant Richards Ltd., London
- Publication date: 15 June 1914
- Pages: 152
- OCLC: 23211235
- Dewey Decimal: 823/.912 20
- LC Class: PR6019.O9 D8 1991
- Text: Dubliners at Wikisource

Dubliners is a collection of fifteen short stories by James Joyce, written from 1904 to 1907. First published in 1914, Dubliners presents a naturalistic depiction of Irish middle-class life in and around Dublin in the early twentieth century.

The stories were written when Irish nationalism was at its peak, and a search for a national identity and purpose was raging; at a crossroads of history and culture, Ireland was jolted by various converging ideas and influences. Joyce felt Irish nationalism, like Catholicism and British rule of Ireland, was responsible for a collective paralysis—a theme permeating much of the work. He conceived of Dubliners as a "nicely polished looking-glass" held up to the Irish and a "first step towards [their] spiritual liberation".

Joyce's concept of epiphany is exemplified in the moment a character experiences self-understanding or illumination. The first three stories in the collection are narrated by young boy protagonists; the subsequent stories are written in the third person and deal with the lives and concerns of progressively older people, in line with Joyce's division of the collection into "childhood, adolescence, maturity, and public life". Many of the characters in Dubliners later appeared in minor roles in Joyce's novel Ulysses.

== Publication history ==
Between 1905, when Joyce first sent a manuscript to a publisher, and 1914, when the book was finally published (on 15 June), Joyce submitted the book eighteen times to a total of fifteen publishers. The London house of Grant Richards agreed to publish it in 1905. Its printer, however, refused to set one of the stories ("Two Gallants"), and Richards then began to press Joyce to remove a number of other passages that he claimed the printer also refused to set. Under protest, Joyce eventually agreed to some of the requested changes, but Richards ended up backing out of the deal.

Joyce submitted the manuscript to other publishers, and, about three years later (1909), he found a willing candidate in Maunsel & Roberts of Dublin. A similar controversy developed, and Maunsel too refused to publish the collection, even threatening to sue Joyce for printing costs already incurred. Joyce offered to pay the printing costs himself if the sheets were turned over to him and he was allowed to complete the job elsewhere and distribute the book, but, when he arrived at the printers, they refused to surrender the sheets and burned them the next day, though Joyce managed to save one copy, which he obtained 'by ruse'. He returned to submitting the manuscript to other publishers, and in 1914 Grant Richards once again agreed to publish the book, using the page proofs saved from Maunsel as copy.

== Stories ==
- "The Sisters" – After the death of Father James Flynn, a young boy close to him hears incredible stories about the priest.
- "An Encounter" – Two schoolboys playing truant encounter a perverted, middle-aged man.
- "Araby" – A boy, infatuated with the sister of his friend Mangan, fails in his quest to buy her a worthy gift from the Araby Bazaar.
- "Eveline" – The young Eveline Hill weighs her decision to flee Ireland with a sailor, Frank, to "Buenos Ayres".
- "After the Race" – College student Jimmy Doyle tries to fit in with his wealthy friends.
- "Two Gallants" – Lenehan wanders around Dublin to kill time while waiting to hear if his friend Corley was able to con a maid out of some money.
- "The Boarding House" – Mrs Mooney successfully manœuvres her daughter Polly into an upwardly mobile marriage with her lodger, Bob Doran.
- "A Little Cloud" – Thomas Malone "Little" Chandler's dinner with his old friend Ignatius Gallaher, who left home to become a journalist in London, casts fresh light on his own failed literary dreams.
- "Counterparts" – Farrington, a lumbering alcoholic scrivener, takes out his frustration in pubs and on his son Tom.
- "Clay" – Maria, a spinster who works in the kitchen at a large Magdalene laundry, celebrates Halloween with a man she cared for, Joe, as a child and his family, the Donnellys.
- "A Painful Case" – James Duffy rebuffs the advances of his friend Emily Sinico, and, four years later, discovers he condemned her to loneliness and death.
- "Ivy Day in the Committee Room" – Several paid canvassers for a minor politician, Richard Tierney, discuss the memory of Charles Stewart Parnell.
- "A Mother" – To win a place of pride for her daughter Kathleen in the Irish Revival, Mrs Kearney arranges for the girl to be accompanist at a series of poorly planned concerts, but her efforts backfire.
- "Grace" – Tom Kernan passes out and falls down the stairs at a bar, so his friends attempt to convince him to come to a Catholic retreat to help him reform.
- "The Dead" – After a holiday party thrown by his aunts and cousin, the Morkans, Gabriel Conroy's wife, Gretta, tells him about a boyfriend, Michael Furey, from her youth, and he has an epiphany about life and death and human connection. (At 15–16,000 words, this story has been classified as a novella.)

Also originally considered for the Dubliners collection was a short story called "Christmas Eve". It was rejected by the author, though a sentence from it was later reincorporated into "Clay".

== Style ==
Besides first-person and third-person narration, Dubliners employs free indirect discourse and shifts in narrative point of view. The collection progresses chronologically, beginning with stories of youth and progressing in age to culminate in "The Dead". Throughout, Joyce can be said to maintain "invisibility", to use his own term for authorial effacement. He wrote the stories "in a style of scrupulous meanness", withholding comment on what is "seen and heard". Dubliners can be seen as a preface to the two novels that will follow, and like them it "seeks a presentation so sharp that comment by the author would be interference".

Joyce's modernist style entailed using dashes for dialogue rather than quotation marks. He asked that they be used in the printed text, but was refused. Dubliners was the only work by Joyce to use quotation marks; dashes, however, are present in all critical and most popular editions.

The impersonal narration doesn't mean that Joyce is undetectable in Dubliners. There are autobiographical elements and possible versions of Joyce had he not left Dublin. The Dublin he remembers is recreated in the specific geographic details, including road names, buildings, and businesses. Joyce freely admitted that his characters and places were closely based on reality. (Because of these details, at least one potential publisher, Maunsel and Company, rejected the book for fear of libel lawsuits.) Ezra Pound argued that, with the necessary changes, "these stories could be retold of any town", that Joyce "gives us things as they are... for any city", by "getting at the universal element beneath" particulars.

Joyce referred to the collection as "a series of epicleti", alluding to the transubstantiation of bread and wine into the body and blood of Christ. He is said to have "often agreed... that 'imagination is nothing but the working over of what is remembered'". But he used the eucharist as a metaphor, characterizing the artist as "a priest of the eternal imagination, transmuting the daily bread of experience into the radiant body of everliving life".

The theme of Dubliners, "what holds [the stories] together and makes them a book [is] hinted on the first page", the "paralysis" or "living death" of which Joyce spoke in a letter of 1904.

The concept of "epiphany", defined in Stephen Hero as "a sudden spiritual manifestation", has been adapted as a narrative device in five stories in Dubliners, in the form of a character's self-realization at the end of the narrative. One critic has suggested that the concept is the basis of an overall narrative strategy, "the commonplace things of Dublin [becoming] embodiments or symbols . . . of paralysis". A later critic, avoiding the term "epiphany", but apparently not the concept, has examined in considerable detail how "church and state manifest themselves in Dubliners" as agents of paralysis. There are numerous such "manifestations".

What immediately distinguishes the stories from Joyce's later works is their apparent simplicity and transparency. Some critics have been led into drawing facile conclusions. The stories have been pigeonholed, seen as realist or naturalist, or instead labeled symbolist. The term "epiphany" has been taken as synonymous with symbol. Critical analysis of elements of stories or stories in their entirety has been problematic. Dubliners may have occasioned more conflicting interpretations than any other modern literary work.

It's been said that Dubliners is unique, defying any form of classification, and perhaps no interpretation can ever be conclusive. The only certainty is that it's a "masterpiece" in its own right and "a significant stepping-stone . . . into the modernist structure of Joyce's mature work".

=== Christ in Dubliners ===
On 10 June 1904, Joyce met Nora Barnacle for the first time. They met again on 16 June. On both days, the Feast of the Sacred Heart was celebrated in Irish Catholic churches. The feast originated on another 16 June, in 1675. A young nun, Margaret Mary Alacoque, had visions of Christ exposing his heart. During the so-called "great apparition" on that date, he asked that a new feast be established to commemorate his suffering. (In the Library episode, Mulligan calls the nun "Blessed Margaret Mary Anycock!") The Feast of the Sacred Heart was formally approved in the same year. The Jesuits popularized the devotion, and Ireland was the first nation to dedicate itself to the Sacred Heart.

The young nun claimed that Christ had made 12 promises to all who would dedicate themselves to the Sacred Heart. The 12th promise offers "salvation to the one who receives communion on nine consecutive First Fridays". Mrs. Kiernan in the Dubliners story "Grace" and Mr. Kearney in "A Mother" try to take advantage of this promise, as did Stephen's mother. A colored print of the 12 promises hangs on Eveline's wall, and there are resemblances between her and Margaret Mary Alacoque and between Frank, her "open-hearted" suitor, and the Sacred Heart. Both young women have been made a promise of salvation by a man professing love. Hugh Kenner argues that Frank has no intention of taking Eveline to Buenos Aires and will seduce and abandon her in Liverpool, where the boat is actually headed. Since "going to Buenos Aires" was slang for "taking up a life of prostitution", it appears that Frank does intend to take Eveline to Buenos Aires, but not to make her his wife. That Eveline's print of the 12 promises made by the Sacred Heart hangs over a "broken" harmonium confirms the close similarity between the two suitors. In "Circe", the Sacred Heart devotion is concisely parodied in the apparition of Martha Clifford, Bloom's pen pal. She calls Bloom a "heartless flirt" and accuses him of "breach of promise".

== Media adaptations ==
- Hugh Leonard adapted six stories as Dublin One, which was staged at the Gate Theatre, Dublin, in 1963.
- In 1987, John Huston directed a film adaptation of "The Dead", written for the screen by his son Tony and starring his daughter Anjelica as Mrs. Conroy.
- In October 1998, BBC Radio 4 broadcast dramatisations by various writers of "A Painful Case", "After the Race", "Two Gallants", "The Boarding House", "A Little Cloud", and "Counterparts". The series ended with a dramatization of "The Dead", which was first broadcast in 1994 under the title "Distant Music". The broadcasts were accompanied by nighttime abridged readings of other stories from Dubliners, starting with "Ivy Day in the Committee Room" (in two parts, read by T. P. McKenna), and continuing with "The Sisters", "An Encounter", "Araby", "Eveline", and "Clay" (all read by Barry McGovern).
- In 1999, a short film adaptation of "Araby" was produced and directed by Dennis Courtney.
- In 2000, a Tony Award-winning musical adaptation of "The Dead" premiered, written by Richard Nelson and Shaun Davey and directed by Nelson.
- In April 2012, Stephen Rea read "The Dead" on RTÉ Radio 1.
- In February 2014, Stephen Rea read all fifteen stories spread across twenty 13-minute segments of Book at Bedtime on BBC Radio 4.
- In June 2014, WNYC's Jerome L. Greene Performance Space presented "Dubliners: A Quartet," an audio play by Arthur Yorinks. This event celebrated the 100th anniversary of the publication of Joyce's book.
- In July 2014, Irish actor Carl Finnegan released a modern retelling of "Two Gallants" as a short film. Finnegan wrote the script with Darren McGrath and also produced, directed, and performed the role of Corley in the film.
- In May 2023, Irish folk music act Hibsen released the album The Stern Task of Living, inspired by Dubliners. The 15-track album by duo Gráinne Hunt and Jim Murphy follows the sequence of the stories in the novel, with each song based on the story after which it is named.

== Sources ==
- Atherton, James (1966). "The Joyce of Dubliners". In Staley, Thomas (ed.). James Joyce Today: Essays on the Major Works. Bloomington: Indiana University Press.
- Lang, Frederick K. (1993). "Ulysses" and the Irish God. Lewisburg, London, Toronto: Bucknell University Press, Associated University Presses. ISBN 0838751504.
- Ryan, Sean Michael (2015). Pezzoli-Olgiati, Daria (ed.). "Heart of Europe: The Sacred Heart Image and Irish-Catholic Self-identity": Religion in Cultural Imaginary: Explorations in Visual and Material Practices. Nomos Verlag. ISBN 978-3845264066.
- Tindall, William York (1959). A Reader's Guide to James Joyce. London: Thames and Hudson. Reprinted 1995 as ISBN 0815603207.
