= Eveline (short story) =

1904 short story by James Joyce

- Short story by James Joyce
- Country: Ireland
- Language: English
- Genre: Short story

Publication
- Published in: Irish Homestead
- Publication type: Journal
- Media type: Print
- Publication date: 1904

Chronology
Araby	After the Race

"Eveline" is a short story by the Irish writer James Joyce. It was first published in 1904 by the journal Irish Homestead and later featured in his 1914 collection of short stories Dubliners. It tells the story of Eveline, a teenager who plans to leave Dublin for Argentina with her "lover".

== Plot ==
A young woman, Eveline, of about nineteen years of age sits by her window, waiting to leave home. She muses on the aspects of her life that are driving her away, while "in her nostrils was the odor of dusty cretonne". Her mother has died as has her older brother Ernest. Her remaining brother, Harry, is on the road "in the church decorating business". She fears that her father will beat her as he used to beat her brothers and she has little loyalty for her sales job. She has fallen for a sailor named Frank who promises to take her with him to Buenos Aires. Before leaving to meet Frank, she hears an organ grinder outside, which reminds her of a melody that played on an organ on the day her mother died and the promise she made to her mother to look after the home. At the dock where she and Frank are ready to embark on a ship together, Eveline becomes paralyzed.

When Frank is referred to as Eveline's "lover", it is only in the sense that they are romantically involved: the word didn't have its current, more clandestine meaning until the 1920s (OED).

Joyce said that his intention in writing the stories was to reveal the "paralysis" suffered by Dubliners of the period. William York Tindall finds Eveline's inability to leave Dublin with Frank to start a new life "the most nearly straightforward expression of paralysis" in the collection. Hugh Kenner finds Frank's success story improbable, his name to be ironic, and argues that his leaving Eveline alone at the dock shows he didn't intend to take her to Buenos Aires, but rather to seduce her in Liverpool, where the ship is actually headed. It has been noted that "'going to Buenos Ayres' was turn-of-the-century slang for 'taking up a life of prostitution'"; a further possible reading is that Frank does intend to bring Eveline to Buenos Aires, but not to make her his wife.
