= Stanislaus Joyce =

Irish teacher, scholar, diarist and writer; brother of James Joyce

John Stanislaus Joyce (17 December 1884 – 16 June 1955) was an Irish teacher, scholar, diarist and writer who lived for many years in Trieste. He was the younger brother of James Joyce. He was generally known as Stanislaus Joyce to distinguish him from his father, who shared the same name.

== Early life ==
Born in County Dublin, Stanislaus was considered a "whetstone" by his more famous brother, who shared his ideas and his books with him. He was three years younger than James, and a constant boyhood companion. Stanislaus rebelled against his native Ireland as his brother had done, and, in 1905, he joined James's household in Trieste on Via Santa Caterina, 1.

== Career ==
Joyce worked as an English-language teacher in the Berlitz School alongside his brother. In 1903, he had already begun to keep a diary that recorded his own thoughts on philosophical and literary matters as well as those of his brother; he later resumed this diary in Trieste. This Book of Days, as he called it, sheds light on James Joyce's life between the years 1906 and 1909. The diary indicates that Stanislaus, truly "his brother's keeper", was called upon to rescue his brother from financial difficulties time and time again. After 1908, he maintained his own address, although he may have lived with his brother again for a time in 1909.

Arrested as a subversive on 28 December 1914, at the beginning of World War I, he was interned by the Austrians at Katzenau, near Linz. After his release, he moved in with his sister Eileen's family. Stanislaus took his brother's teaching position at Trieste's Scuola Superiore di Commercio "Revoltella" in 1920; this school later became assimilated into the University of Trieste and he continued on as a non-tenured professor of English until his death. Due to his anti-Fascist views, Stanislaus moved to Florence sometime in 1941, where he may have been protected from the Germans by various wealthy Italian and American families.

== Books ==
Joyce later published Recollections of James Joyce (1950); published after his death on 16 June ("Bloomsday") were My Brother's Keeper (1957), Dublin Diary (1962), and Complete Dublin Diary (1971). In the 1950s, Stanislaus had also assisted Richard Ellmann, his brother's biographer, with Ellmann's monumental James Joyce (1959). He also wrote an introduction for the translated version of Italo Svevo's As A Man Grows Older.

Stanislaus often fought with his brother, as well as with his brother's wife Nora Barnacle, but they shared a common literary philosophy despite the fact that Stanislaus had received less advanced schooling than his brother. Stanislaus, however, channelled these instincts into sober academic study rather than wild flights of literary fancy. Of his brother, Stanislaus wrote,

It seems to me little short of a miracle that anyone should have striven to cultivate poetry or cared to get in touch with the current of European thought while living in a household such as ours, typical as it was of the squalor of a drunken generation. Some inner purpose transfigured him.

== Personal life ==
On 13 August 1928 Stanislaus married Nelly Lichtensteiger. They had one son, James, who was born in February 1943.

== Death ==
Stanislaus died in the Free Territory of Trieste, and is buried in Trieste at the Via della Pace cemetery.

== Sources ==
- My Brother's Keeper
- My Brother's Keeper: James Joyce's Early Years, Stanislaus Joyce, The Viking Press, New York (1958)
- The Complete Dublin Diary of Stanislaus Joyce, George H. Healey (editor), Cornell University Press, Ithaca, New York (1971)
