= George Dempsey =

George Dempsey may refer to:

- George Dempsey (basketball) (1929–2017), American basketball player
- George Dempsey (cyclist) (1905–1985), Australian Olympic cyclist
- George Dempsey (diplomat), American diplomat
- George Dempsey (teacher), Irish teacher
