= Epiphany (literature) =

Moment of profound insight for a character

Epiphany in literature refers generally to a visionary moment when a character has a sudden insight or realization that changes their understanding of themselves or their comprehension of the world. The term has a more specialized sense as a literary device distinct to modernist fiction. Author James Joyce first borrowed the Christian term "Epiphany" and adopted it into a profane literary context in Stephen Hero (1904–1906), an early version of A Portrait of the Artist as a Young Man. In that manuscript, Stephen Daedalus defines epiphany as "a sudden spiritual manifestation, whether in the vulgarity of speech or of gesture or in a memorable phase of the mind itself." Stephen's epiphanies are moments of heightened poetic perception in the trivial aspects of everyday Dublin life. They become the basis of Stephen's theory of aesthetic perception as well as his writing. In similar terms, Joyce experimented with epiphany throughout his career, from the short stories he wrote between 1898 and 1904 which were central to his early work, to his late novel Finnegans Wake (1939). Scholars used Joyce's term to describe a common feature of the modernist novel, with authors as varied as Virginia Woolf, Marcel Proust, Ezra Pound, and Katherine Mansfield all featuring these sudden moments of vision as an aspect of the contemporary mind. Joycean or modernist epiphany has its roots in nineteenth-century lyric poetry, especially the Wordsworthian "spots of time," as well as the sudden spiritual insights that formed the basis of traditional spiritual autobiography. Philosopher Charles Taylor explains the rise of epiphany in modernist art as a reaction against the rise of a "commercial-industrial-capitalist society" during the early twentieth century.

== Etymology ==
The word "epiphany" descends from the ancient Greek ἐπῐφᾰ́νειᾰ (epipháneia), meaning a "manifestation or appearance." The word is built from the Greek words "pha" (to shine), "phanein" (to show, to cause to shine), and "epiphanein" (to manifest, to bring to light). In ancient Greek usage, the term often describes the visible manifestation of a god or goddess to mortal eyes, a form of theophany. Early Christians adopted the term to describe the manifestation of the child, Jesus to the Magi, which was understood figuratively as the revelation of Christ to the Gentiles and commemorated in the Catholic Feast of Epiphany, celebrated January 6. In the Greek New Testament manuscripts, epiphaneia refers also to Christ's second coming.

== Epiphanies in Dubliners ==
Dubliners
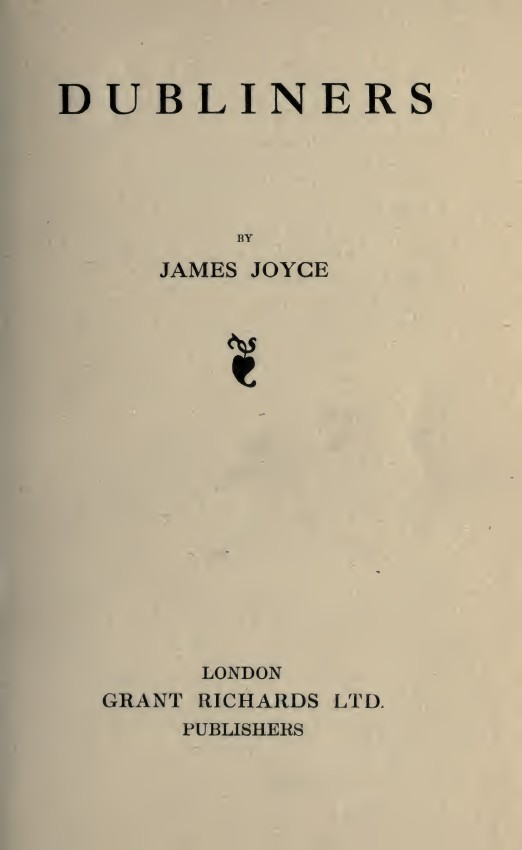
- The title page of the 1914 first edition of Dubliners.
- Author: James Joyce
- Language: English
- Genre: Short story
- Publisher: Grant Richards Ltd., London
- Publication date: June 1914
- Pages: 152

Dubliners by James Joyce is a collection of short stories published in June 1914. The short stories, set in Dublin, capture some of the most unhappy moments in life. Dublin, to Joyce, seemed to be the centre of paralysis, which he explains in a letter to Grant Richards, who was the publisher of Dubliners. Joyce explains his purpose and intention behind writing the collection:

"My intention was to write a chapter of the moral history of my country and I chose Dublin for the scene because that city seemed to me the centre of paralysis. I have tried to present it to the indifferent public under four of its aspects: childhood, adolescence, maturity, and public life. The stories are arranged in this order. I have written it for the most part in a style of scrupulous meanness and with the conviction that he is a very bold man who dares to alter in the presentment, still more to deform, whatever he has seen and heard."

Joyce introduced the concept of "epiphany" in Stephen Hero to preface a discussion of Aquinas's three criteria of beauty, wholeness, harmony, and radiance: when the object "seems to us radiant, [it] achieves its epiphany". The term isn't used when Stephen Dedalus covers the same ground in A Portrait of the Artist as a Young Man. In Stephen Hero the protagonist thinks of recording epiphanies in a book, and there's a reference to Stephen Dedalus's collection of epiphanies in Ulysses. Joyce himself recorded over seventy epiphanies, of which forty have survived.

An "epiphany" may be more colloquially defined as "a sudden spiritual manifestation, whether from some object, scene, event, or memorable phase of the mind – the manifestation being out of proportion to the significance or strictly logical relevance of whatever produces it". The concept has been adapted as a narrative device in five stories in Dubliners, in the form of a character's self-realization at the end of the narrative.

=== An Encounter ===
The story, narrated in the first person, is about a boy and his friend Mahony taking a day off from school to seek adventure in their dull lives. The boy has sought escape from his daily routine in stories of the Wild West and American detective stories and in make-believe warfare with his schoolmates. However, "The mimic warfare of the evening became at last as wearisome to me as the routine of school in the morning because I wanted real adventures to happen to myself. But real adventures, I reflected, do not happen to people who remain at home: they must be sought abroad." His plan is to play truant, walk to the docks along the Liffey, Dublin's river, cross it by ferry, and walk toward the Pigeon House, Dublin's power station. The story describes the boys' excursion and the people they see. They get a glimpse of the world outside Dublin in the foreign sailors at the docks and are exposed to city's social diversity. They become too tired to go to the Pigeon House and stop to rest. An older man approaches them and begins talk of such mundane subjects as reading Sir Walter Scott and boys having young sweethearts. At one point, the man excuses himself and masturbates. His friend Mahony leaves the boy alone. The man returns and begins a drawn-out monologue on the need to whip boys who misbehave. Deeply unsettled, the boy gets up to leave and calls to Mahony. He's relieved when his friend comes to him, but also ashamed for having looked down on him.

Joyce's brother Stanislaus wrote that the story was based on their encounter with an "elderly pederast" while playing truant.

The boys' journey to the Pigeon House has been interpreted as a futile quest for Ireland's Church, like the visit to the bazaar "Araby", and the pervert they encounter has been taken as a counterpart to Father Flynn in "The Sisters".

=== Araby ===
Through first-person narration, the reader is immersed at the start of the story in the drab life that people live on North Richmond Street, which seems to be illuminated only by the verve and imagination of the children who, despite the growing darkness that comes during the winter months, insist on playing "until [their] bodies glowed". Even though the conditions of this neighbourhood leave much to be desired, the children's play is infused with their almost magical way of perceiving the world, which the narrator dutifully conveys to the reader:

Our shouts echoed in the silent street. The career of our play brought us through the dark muddy lanes behind the houses where we ran the gauntlet of the rough tribes from the cottages, to the back doors of the dark dripping gardens where odours arose from the ashpits, to the dark odorous stables where a coachman smoothed and combed the horse or shook music from the buckled harness.

But though these boys "career" around the neighborhood in a very childlike way, they are also aware of and interested in the adult world, as represented by their spying on the narrator's uncle as he comes home from work and, more importantly, on Mangan's sister, whose dress "swung as she moved" and whose "soft rope of hair tossed from side to side". These boys are on the brink of sexual awareness and, awed by the mystery of another sex, are hungry for knowledge.

On one rainy evening, the boy secludes himself in a soundless, dark drawing-room and gives his feelings for her full release: "I pressed the palms of my hands together until they trembled, murmuring: O love! O love! many times." This scene is the culmination of the narrator's increasingly romantic idealization of Mangan's sister. By the time he actually speaks to her, he has built up such an unrealistic idea of her that he can barely put sentences together: "When she addressed the first words to me I was so confused that I did not know what to answer. She asked me if I was going to Araby. I forget whether I answered yes or no." But the narrator recovers splendidly: when Mangan's sister dolefully states that she will not be able to go to Araby, he gallantly offers to bring something back for her.

The narrator now cannot wait to go to the Araby bazaar and procure for his beloved some grand gift that will endear him to her. And though his aunt frets, hoping that it is not "some Freemason affair", and though his uncle, perhaps intoxicated, perhaps stingy, arrives so late from work and equivocates so much that he almost keeps the narrator from being able to go, the intrepid yet frustrated narrator heads out of the house, tightly clenching a florin, in spite of the late hour, toward the bazaar.

But the Araby market turns out not to be the fantastic place he had hoped it would be. It is late; most of the stalls are closed. The only sound is "the fall of the coins" as men count their money. Worst of all, however, is the vision of sexuality—of his future—that he receives when he stops at one of the few remaining open stalls. The young woman minding the stall is engaged in a conversation with two young men. Though he is potentially a customer, she only grudgingly and briefly waits on him before returning to her frivolous conversation. His idealized vision of Araby is destroyed, along with his idealized vision of Mangan's sister—and of love: "Gazing up into the darkness I saw myself as a creature driven and derided by vanity, and my eyes burned with anguish and anger."

"Araby" contains themes and characteristics common to Joyce in general and Dubliners in particular. Like "Eveline", "Araby" involves a character going on a journey that ends in futility. The boy lives with his aunt and uncle, like the boy in "The Sisters". The boy's uncle appears to be a prototype of Simon Dedalus in A Portrait of the Artist as a Young Man and Ulysses. One critic, noting the story's religious allusions, and finding in its ending the suggestion of an emptying church, sees the boy's journey to Araby as a futile quest for Ireland's Church. Another critic, expanding on the idea, has argued that Joyce drew upon the Church's iconography to depict Mangan's sister and its liturgy to render the bazaar's closing, and that the story should be read as a parody of the Eucharist akin to "The Sisters".

=== Eveline ===
A young woman, Eveline, of about nineteen years of age sits by her window, waiting to leave home. She muses on the aspects of her life that are driving her away, while "in her nostrils was the odor of dusty cretonne". Her mother has died as has her older brother Ernest. Her remaining brother, Harry, is on the road "in the church decorating business". She fears that her father will beat her as he used to beat her brothers and she has little loyalty for her sales job. She has fallen for a sailor named Frank who promises to take her with him to Buenos Aires. Before leaving to meet Frank, she hears an organ grinder outside, which reminds her of a melody that played on an organ on the day her mother died and the promise she made to her mother to look after the home. At the dock where she and Frank are ready to embark on a ship together, Eveline becomes paralyzed.

When Frank is referred to as Eveline's "lover", it's only in the sense that they are romantically involved: the word didn't have its current meaning until the 1920s (OED).

Joyce said that his intention in writing the stories was to reveal the "paralysis" suffered by Dubliners of the period. One Joyce critic finds Eveline's inability to leave Dublin with Frank to start a new life "the most nearly straightforward expression of paralysis" in the collection. Another finds Frank's success story improbable, thinks the name "Frank" to be ironic, and argues that his leaving Eveline alone at the dock shows he didn't intend to take her to Buenos Aires, but rather to seduce her in Liverpool, where the ship is actually headed. It's been noted that "'going to Buenos Ayres' was turn-of-the-century slang for 'taking up a life of prostitution'"; a further possible reading is that Frank does intend to bring Eveline to Buenos Aires, but not to make her his wife.

=== A Little Cloud ===
The story follows Thomas Chandler, or "Little Chandler" as he is known, through a portion of his day. The story drops the reader into Little Chandler's life when he is at work, where he cannot focus because he is preoccupied with the thought of a visit later that day. He anxiously awaits this visit with his old friend Ignatius Gallaher. Gallaher is now a "brilliant figure" in the London Press and Little Chandler has not seen him in eight years. As Little Chandler thinks about his old friend and the success that has come to him, he begins to reflect upon his own life. This reflection gives the reader insight to Little Chandler's character. The reader sees Little Chandler as a mere observer of life, a reluctant character. He is timid, because he enjoys poetry and yet is "too shy" to read it to his wife.

Little Chandler likes to think that he himself could have been a writer if he had put his mind to it, and that all of the "different moods and impressions he wished to express in verse" could still be achieved if he could just express himself. However, as much as Little Chandler tries to cover his true feelings with self-comforting thoughts, the reader sees past him.

These feelings are more clearly exposed to the reader in the bar where Little Chandler actually meets Gallaher. Here, Gallaher tells enchanting stories of his vast traveling, where his life is the exact opposite of Little Chandler's. Little Chandler begins to feel that his wife is holding him back from success as a result of Gallaher's glorification of his travels and freedoms, and that without his wife and little boy, he would be free to prosper. Deep envy sets into Little Chandler. It seems as though the more they drink, and the longer they talk, the more inferior Chandler feels. Still, he tries to hide his envy of Gallaher's life, by saying that one day Gallaher will get married and start a family, too.

Joyce shifts the scene to Little Chandler's home. We find Little Chandler with his child in his arms. He is sitting at a table looking at a picture of his wife, Annie. He looks into her eyes searching for answers to his now confused state of mind. All he finds is coldness. He sees a pretty girl, but he can see no life in her, and he compares her unfavourably to the rich, exotic women Gallaher says are available to him. He wonders why he married Annie. He then opens a book of Byron's poetry and reads, until the child begins to cry, and Little Chandler finds he cannot comfort him. Little Chandler snaps at his son. The frightened baby cries harder and harder until Annie comes. Through her interaction with Little Chandler and the child, it becomes apparent that Little Chandler is not her main priority.

Little Chandler feels trapped. All feelings of hope that existed at the beginning of the day are now gone. It is at this moment that Little Chandler reaches a deep moment of recognition. He finally sees the truth that the reader has known all along. His own reluctance is the only thing responsible for his feelings of incompleteness, and he can now only blame himself. Tears come to Little Chandler's eyes, and the story is cut off.

=== The Dead ===
The story centres on Gabriel Conroy, a teacher and part-time book reviewer, and explores the relationships he has with his family and friends. Gabriel and his wife, Gretta, arrive late to an annual Christmas party, hosted by his aunts, Kate and Julia Morkan, who eagerly receive him. After an awkward encounter with Lily, the caretaker's daughter, Gabriel goes upstairs, and joins the rest of the party attendees. Gabriel worries about the speech he has to give, especially because it contains academic references, which he fears his audience will not understand. When Freddy Malins arrives drunk, as the hosts of the party had feared, Aunt Kate asks Gabriel to make sure he is all right.

As the party moves on, Gabriel is confronted by Miss Ivors, an Irish nationalist, about his publishing a weekly literary column in the Unionist newspaper The Daily Express. She teases him by calling him a "West Briton," that is, a supporter of English political control of Ireland. Gabriel points out that he gets 15 shillings a week, and "the books he received for review were almost more welcome than the paltry cheque". He thinks this charge is highly unfair, but fails to offer a satisfactory rejoinder. The encounter ends awkwardly, which bothers Gabriel the rest of the night. He becomes more disaffected, when he tells his wife of the encounter, and she expresses an interest in returning to visit her childhood home of Galway. The music and party continue; but Gabriel retreats into himself, thinking of the snow outside and his impending speech.

Dinner begins, with Gabriel seated at the head of the table. The guests discuss music and the practices of certain monks. Once the dining has died down, Gabriel thinks once more about the snow – and begins his speech, praising traditional Irish hospitality, observing that "we are living in a sceptical...thought-tormented age," and referring to Aunt Kate, Aunt Julia, and Mary Jane as the Three Graces. The speech ends with a toast, and the guests sing "For they are jolly gay fellows".

As the party winds down, the guests filter out, and Gabriel prepares to leave. He finds his wife standing, apparently lost in thought, at the top of the stairs. In another room Bartell D'Arcy sings "The Lass of Aughrim". The Conroys leave; and Gabriel is excited, for it has been a long time since he and Gretta have had a night in a hotel to themselves. When they arrive at the hotel, Gabriel's aspirations of passionate lovemaking are conclusively dashed by Gretta's lack of interest. He presses her about what is bothering her, and she admits that she is "thinking about that song, The Lass of Aughrim". She admits that it reminds her of someone, a young man named Michael Furey, who had courted her in her youth in Galway. He used to sing "The Lass of Aughrim" for her. Furey died at seventeen, early in their relationship; and she had been very much in love with him. She believes that it was his insistence on coming to meet her in the winter and the rain, while already sick, that killed him. After telling these things to Gabriel, Gretta falls asleep. At first, Gabriel is shocked and dismayed that there was something of such significance in his wife's life that he never knew about. He ponders the role of the countless dead in living people's lives, and observes that everyone he knows, himself included, will one day only be a memory. He finds in this fact a profound affirmation of life. Gabriel stands at the window, watching the snow fall; and the narrative expands past him, edging into the surreal, and encompassing the entirety of Ireland. As the story ends, we are told that "His soul swooned slowly, as he heard the snow falling faintly through the universe, and faintly falling, like the descent of their last end, upon all the living and the dead".

== Gerard Manley Hopkins’s "Inscape" ==
Gerard Manley Hopkins (1844 – 1889) was an English poet and Jesuit priest. William York Tindall has commented, referring to Stephen Dedalus's aesthetic theory in A Portrait of the Artist as a Young Man, "Radiance is epiphany [and] Stephen’s radiance or showing forth is not unlike the 'inscape' of Gerard Manley Hopkins, which may be defined as the essence or individuality of a thing that shines out from it; but whereas Stephen’s radiance is Thomistic quidditas or whatness, Hopkins’s inscape resembles the haecceitas or thisness of Duns Scotus. . . . [They] are alike in centering upon the object".

== William Wordsworth's "Spots of time" ==
William Wordsworth was a Romantic poet in the 1800s. He became renowned through his collaboration with Samuel Taylor Coleridge on the collection of poems titled the Lyrical Ballads. In Wordsworth's time, epiphanies had not yet been given that term and were referred to by Wordsworth as "spots of time." There is agreement that the modern literary device we call "epiphany" began with Romanticism and in particular with the works of William Wordsworth. Wordsworth's innovation of "spots of time" in his poems have affected modern fiction and the modern short story.

=== The Prelude ===
The main plot points of The Prelude center upon the exploration of epiphany, which Wordsworth presents as vital to the history of his imagination. Two central themes to The Prelude are of childhood and memory and the adventures that Wordsworth has had as a child in the Lake District. These childhood memories, recollected in adulthood, include epiphanies that Wordsworth refers to as "spots of time."

==== Book Twelve of The Prelude: Imagination and Taste, How Impaired and Restored ====
In the twelfth book of The Prelude, Wordsworth in his poem elaborates on the experience of the rejuvenating virtue that is given to him through his epiphanic moments that he recalls from childhood experience.

"There are in our existence spots of time,/ That with distinct pre-eminence retain,/ A renovating virtue, whence--depressed/ By false opinion and contentious thought,/ Or aught of heavier or more deadly weight,/ In trivial occupations, and the round/ Of ordinary intercourse—our minds/ Are nourished and invisibly repaired;/ A virtue, by which pleasure is enhanced,/ That penetrates, enables us to mount,/ When high, more high, and lifts us up when fallen./ This efficacious spirit chiefly lurks/ Among those passages of life that give/ Profoundest knowledge to what point, and how,/ The mind is lord and master—outward sense/ The obedient servant of her will. Such moments/ Are scattered everywhere, taking their date/ From our first childhood."

The language Wordsworth uses within this excerpt suggests that he has had many 'spots of time' that he could draw upon from his memory that could give him strength as they release to him a sense of epiphany in his new realisation of seeing the world in a recollection of youth.

== Notable Authors that use epiphanies ==
The use of epiphanies as a stylistic and structural device in narrative and poetry came to prominence in the Romantic era. It was a popular literary device of the modernist author.

- Dubliners, by James Joyce
- A Portrait of the Artist as a Young Man, by James Joyce
- The Prelude, by William Wordsworth
- Virginia Woolf
- Joseph Conrad
- Marcel Proust
- William Faulkner
- Katherine Mansfield
- Samual Taylor Coleridge
- Percy Shelley
- John Keats
- Robert Browning
- William Butler Yeats
- Charles Baudelaire
- Arthur Rimbaud
- Ezra Pound

== Sources ==
- Joyce, James (1993) [First published in Great Britain by Grant Richards Ltd. 1914]. Dubliners. New York: Penguin. ISBN 978-0-14-018647-5.
