= George Dempsey (teacher) =

English teacher of James Joyce and Austin Clarke at Belvedere College

George Dempsey (1854 – 29 June 1924) born in the parish of St. Mary's, Dublin was a teacher of English at Belvedere College, Dublin, Ireland, who taught English to the writer James Joyce and later the poet Austin Clarke during the time they attended the Jesuit school. At the same time he ran a grocer's shop and post office at 13 Dunville Ave, Rathmines. The character of Mr. Tate in Joyce's novels A Portrait of the Artist as a Young Man and Stephen Hero is based on George Dempsey. George Dempsey died at 13 Dunville Avenue at the age of 70.

An annual prize in memory of Dempsey is awarded each year at Belvedere College to a student who has excelled in English writing.
