= John Hennig =

John Hennig

John Hennig (born Paul Gottfried Johannes Hennig; 3 March 1911 – 11 December 1986) was a German theologian, businessman and scholar of Irish and German Literature.

== Origins ==
Hennig was born in Leipzig on 3 March 1911, the son of a teacher, Max Hennig, and his wife Johanna Clemen. Like his brother Karl (1903–1992), later to be a theologian and pastor, Hans, as he was known, frequented the Thomasschule (Thomas School) in Leipzig. The family was Lutheran. Hennig's mother was a deaconess at her marriage and his father had a doctorate in the psychology of religious perception and was an ordained minister, though he had chosen to become a high-school religion teacher rather than a pastor. A brother of Hans' mother, Paul Clemen, was a professor of art history at Bonn, and so the family had ample religious and academic connections.

It was partly with the idea of becoming a Lutheran pastor that Hennig went on to university studies. He studied first at the Friedrich-Wilhelm University in Bonn, lodging with his uncle Paul, then at the Friedrich-Wilhelms University in Berlin and the University of Leipzig. His wide-ranging subject areas were theology, philosophy, history and modern languages. Among his professors were the considerable scholars Theodor Frings, Erich Rothacker and Eduard Spranger, and also Ernst Robert Curtius, a friend of Albert Schweitzer.

It was Hennig's misfortune that his studies climaxed in 1933, just in the months when the Nazi party took over the national government in Germany and political ideology began to colour even academic politics and opinions. Already as a teenager, Hennig had made it clear to fellow students that he was opposed to the militarism that was popular in Germany after the First World War: “I had been a radical pacifist since 1924”. Now, in the face of the rapidly deteriorating situation, the vote he received from the relevant academic body was favourable only by a tight margin. Despite this, he was granted the degree of Doctor of Philosophy for a thesis entitled Lebensbegriff und Lebenskategorie. Studien zur Geschichte und Theorie der geistesgeschichtlichen Begriffsbildung (Life-Concept and Life-Category. Studies on the History and Theory of Concept Formation in Intellectual History). One supervisor was Professor Joachim Wach, a historian of religion and later a pioneer of the sociology of religion, the other was Professor Theodor Litt, a philosopher of social realities and pedagogics. Wach was descended from the Mendelssohn family of converted Jews and hence for that alone ill-viewed by the Nazis. Litt was viewed with similar opprobrium, though in his case for his intellectual adherence to the Weimar Republic.

== Marriage ==
While a student at Bonn, the young Hennig met and fell for Kläre Meyer (1904–1990), the daughter of the wealthy Jewish inventor and entrepreneur Felix Meyer. The two kept in close touch during the time that Hennig spent enrolled as a theology student in Berlin, with a view to taking up Lutheran Church ministry. Their contacts continued when Hennig enrolled at Leipzig University in the winter semester 1930–1931.

On 10 April 1933, Hennig arrived by the night train in Aachen and that same morning married Kläre in the registry office before catching the train back to Leipzig to sit his state exams. Apart from increasing his difficulties and in particular excluding his obtaining university posts in a Nazi-dominated society, the marriage also definitively put paid to an ecclesiastical career in the Lutheran Church. By late July 1933, he had acquired his PhD and turned to face married life and look for a job, which was offered by his reluctant father-in-law, Felix Meyer. An inventor who by the late 1930s had some 250 industrial patents to his name, Meyer had founded a firm for their exploitation in 1909. He came from a Jewish family with Westphalian roots going back to the sixteenth century but that was not of strict religious observance. Meyer was also a German patriot and one of the Jews who refused to believe that the rise to power of the Nazi party constituted a danger, to the point that he even returned to Germany in 1938 after a journey to the United States with his wife. However, it was in the course of that same year that events caught up with him, especially after the so-called Kristallnacht of 9–10 November, during which he spent some hours under arrest, and by the end of that year he had been forced out of the firm and its management taken over reluctantly by his son-in-law Hennig. On 2 February 1939, Meyer was allowed to emigrate legally to Belgium, being married since 1906 to a Belgian woman, Marguerite Darmstaedter. However, the German invasion of the Netherlands and Belgium on 10 May 1940 meant that the couple were stranded as German Jews in German-occupied Brussels, a potentially fatal development.

== Founding a family ==
Following their marriage, Hennig and his wife formed a home and family in Aachen and had two daughters, Gabriele and Monica, born in 1936 and 1938. Despite the work in industrial management, to him uncongenial, Hennig managed to pursue his studies and in 1936 he published an article about the book Vernunft und Existenz (Reason and Existence), later becoming a personal friend of the author, Karl Jaspers. It was in the same year 1936 that Hennig became a convert to Catholicism, in which he was later followed by his wife.

== Conversion and exile ==
One element in the conversion was the revival of an acquaintance with Heinrich Keller (1894–1942), with whom Hennig had studied in Leipzig and who as a Jesuit was rector of a college at Valkenburg in the Netherlands. When the Hennigs realized that they, too, would have to emigrate and that options were extremely limited, Keller was the means to a contact with the prestigious Jesuit run school, Belvedere College in Dublin, to which Hennig made an exploratory visit at Easter 1939. On 26 August 1939 he left Aachen legally for Belgium and shortly afterwards learned that an entry visa for Ireland was waiting for him at the Irish Legation in Paris. Managing to have it retrieved by a paid messenger, and forced then to leave his family behind for the moment, he first landed on the English coast at Folkestone and then headed via London through England and made the sea-crossing to Ireland on 6 October 1939. He recalled that at Folkestone a Jewish passenger was refused permission to land and as a consequence took his own life. Hennig was later told that by that time neutral Ireland had admitted only 110 immigrants in the face of the European war crisis.

== Years of hardship ==
Apart from work in a teaching post that turned out to be less remunerative and more precarious than had seemed, Hennig launched himself into an intensive activity of article writing, private German lessons, teaching at the national seminary for priests in Maynooth and at University College, Dublin, lecturing and even radio talks. Though formally neutral and in various respects pro-German, the Irish Free State was an impoverished country and wartime conditions made it difficult for the foreigner Hennig, though a Catholic with a reasonable grasp of English, to make a living. Trying after the birth of a third child to ensure greater financial security for the future, Hennig enrolled in 1943 for a degree course in architecture, with a view to opening the way to a sure second career.

He was subsequently joined by his family in November 1939 and together they began their Irish life, with its twists and turns of good and bad fortunate as they found congenial accommodation in a cottage with a garden at Sutton to the north of Dublin, but the wife and children went down with whooping cough and other health problems soon after their arrival. The elder girl, Gabriele, developed a lung complication and in desperation the family sought the help of a paediatrician, Dr Robert Collis, who treated the girl free of charge and in effect saved her life. In 1942 another child was born, Margaret May Joan (Maggie). The earlier years were made easier by the friendship and social acceptance of a number of other German-speaking exiles, such as Erwin Schrödinger, an Austrian Nobel prize-winner for Physics, the medievalist Ludwig Bieler and the bacteriologist Hans Sachs. On the other hand, for practicality, the couple adopted anglicized first names, Hans becoming John and Kläre becoming Claire, names they kept to live out their lives.

During the war years, the Hennigs managed to keep some contact with their Meyer in-laws in Belgium. Neither young nor fit, but a man of considerable character, Felix Meyer took up the cause of other Jews in Belgium, playing on his standing with Belgian industrialists to obtain medical supplies for prisoners, and with sheer bravado even complaining to high-ranking Gestapo officers about the legality of some of the detentions, Often, he was able to exploit the fears for civil unrest or for postwar personal retribution of the components of the military government in Belgium, and not rarely he played off Gestapo and German military against each other, obtaining the release of prisoners or at least improvement of their conditions. He was also instrumental in establishing old people's homes and residential hospitals for Jews, aiming always at strictly legal methods. Most of all, he impeded many of the deportations of Jews that the Nazis organized in foreign territories they had occupied. After the reconquest of Belgium by the Allies, Meyer stayed in the country. With the end of the European war the full truth about the Nazi concentration camps became fully public and Dr Robert Collis, who had saved Gabriele Hennig some years before, was involved in an operation to save surviving children. For a time the Hennigs weighed up the possibility of adopting one of the children, though in the end on Meyer's advice decided against it. The strain of publicly fronting these initiatives and after the war of fighting to regain legal possession of his firm Rotawerke undoubtedly contributed to Meyer's death in 1950.

The end of the war did not mean that conditions in Ireland were any the less bleak. Hennig lost his part-time jobs as a German teacher at University College, Dublin, and at Maynooth. Moreover, his pursuit of a degree in architecture was blocked when he was informed that to continue he would have to pass an exam in mathematics. In late 1946 Hennig was glad to accept a job as a clerk with the Bord na Móna (Irish state peat-extraction enterprise) at a somewhat isolated location at Newbridge, County Kildare, 40 miles from Dublin, where he was obliged to lodge during the week. He kept the job for three and a half years, during which he made the most of his long hours of solitude to pursue studies and writing. From there he found a similar job with the state electricity company, but this time at their central office in downtown Dublin, which reunited him with his family and gave him ready access to the city's libraries.

== Literary output ==
Hennig's literary output in Ireland included many newspaper and magazine articles, mostly short, many couched in the style of popular journalism, but all betraying his serious academic formation and abilities, a lively intelligence, an enquiring mind and a committed and reasoned Catholic faith. Although in the early 1940s, the idea of possible emigration to the United States had surfaced from time to time, in 1945 he succeeded in obtaining an Irish passport. Personable, interesting and witty company, if a little gloomy at times, Hennig endeared to himself a large circle of friends and acquaintances in many sectors of Irish society. In 1948 his scholarly status was recognized by admission to the Royal Irish Academy.

== Return to the Continent ==
Notwithstanding the increasing involvement of the family in Irish life, in 1956 the Hennigs made the decision to return to the Continent, largely for the sake of the daughters’ future, but also to allow Hennig to take control of the Meyer business, which had returned to family ownership, though it was bereft of the managerial skills of its founder, Felix Meyer, who died on 14 April 1950. A plant of the Rota firm had been established at Säckingen in Germany, on the southern edge of the Black Forest area, but mindful of the events of the Nazi period, the Hennigs could not entirely reconcile themselves to the land of their origins and took up residence in nearby Basel, Switzerland, Hennig commuting from there over the border daily to manage the firm. While less stressful than the paid employment he had known in the postwar years in Ireland, it was a humdrum task in which fundamentally had no interest, but it ensured his family's financial stability and was seen by him as a duty to the memory of his revered father-in-law. The firm was years later to become a subsidiary of the Japanese Yokogawa group.

Even after leaving Ireland (to which he never returned) Hennig continued to write and research on Irish subjects and can be considered the pioneer of what he himself termed Irlandkunde (German-Irish studies), but also on historical subjects concerning Catholic liturgy and especially in the field of research on the figure of Johann Wolfgang von Goethe. In 1967 he was made an Extraordinary Member of the Abt-Herwegen-Institut für Liturgische und Monastische Forschung (Abbot Herwegen Institute for Liturgical and Monastic Research) of Maria Laach Abbey, near Bonn.

Despite the initial difficulties in gaining local acceptance in the somewhat clannish Basle society, Hennig did benefit from the renewed possibility of publishing in German and from the residence in the city from 1948 of his friend Jaspers. In 1970 he received an honorary doctorate from the University of Basel. In 1971 he was granted Swiss citizenship.

== Death ==
Hennig died on 11 December 1986 in Basel, of a thoracic tumour from which he had suffered for some years. At his wish, the body was cremated and the urn buried without identification in the communal grave of Basel's Hörnli cemetery. This choice was made out of solidarity with the victims of Nazism.

== Publications ==
Hennig's work, dispersed in many different publications, was in part brought together in various retrospective collections:

- John Hennig, Literatur und Existenz, Ausgewählte Aufsätze, Carl Winter, Heidelberg, 1980.
- John Hennig, Goethes Europakultur, Goethes Kenntnisse des nicht deutschsprachigen Europas, Rodopi, Amsterdam, 1987.
- John Hennig, Goethe and the English Speaking World, Peter Lang, Berne, 1988, ISBN 978-3261039057.
- John Hennig, Medieval Ireland, Saints and Martyrologies, Variorum, Northampton, 1989, ISBN 978-0860782469.
- John Hennig, Liturgie gestern und heute, [privately printed],1989.
- John Hennig, Exil in Irland, John Hennigs Schriften zu deutsch-irischen Beziehungen, Wissenschaftlicher Verlag, Trier, 2002.

His privately published autobiography is a story of experiences and opinions rather than dates:

- John Hennig, Die bleibende Statt, [privately printed], 1987.
