= Vincent Barry =

Irish scientist

Vincent Barry MRIA
- Born: 17 May 1908; Cork, Ireland
- Died: 4 September 1975 (aged 67)
- Education: North Monastery; University College Dublin (M.Sc., 1929); University of Galway (D.Sc., 1939)
- Known for: Leading the team which developed the anti-leprosy drug clofazimine
- Spouse: Angela O'Connor (m. 1931)
- Children: 6
- Awards: Boyle Medal (1969); UNESCO Science Prize (1980)
- Scientific career
- Fields: Chemistry
- Workplaces: Trinity College Dublin

Vincent Christopher Barry MRIA (17 May 1908 – 4 September 1975) was an Irish scientist and researcher. He is known for leading the team which developed the anti-leprosy drug clofazimine.

== Early life and education ==
Vincent Christoper Barry was born on 17 May 1908 to Agnes (née Stack) and James Barry, an Assistant Superintendent telegraphist in the post office in Sunday's Well, Cork. He was the youngest of 11 children.

After secondary school in the North Monastery he earned a scholarship to University College Dublin (UCD) where in 1928 he obtained a first class honours degree in organic chemistry, placing first in his class.

In 1929, he earned an M.Sc. and after graduation, Barry moved to NUI Galway where he worked under Professor Thomas Dillon working on polysaccharides in seaweed. In 1939, he earned his D.Sc. Barry was a Gaeilgeoir, a speaker of the Irish language and delivered lectures at Galway in Irish.

== Research ==
In 1943, Barry returned to Dublin on a fellowship in organic chemistry to work for the Medical Research Council. He researched the chemotherapy of tuberculosis, looking for a cure for TB which was a significant health issue in Ireland at the time. His work developed instead into an effective treatment for leprosy.

Barry worked with The Leprosy Mission in Zimbabwe and India to develop drugs against tuberculosis and leprosy. From 1950, he led a team of nine scientists, including Frank Winder, J.G. Belton, Stanley McElhinney, M.L. Conalty, Seán O'Sullivan, and Dermot Twomey at Trinity College, Dublin. They first synthesised B663 in 1954, and it was launched as the anti-leprosy drug clofazimine in 1957.

From the middle of the 1960s, Barry's research moved towards investigating the chemotherapy of cancer. Barry travelled the world lecturing and with his research team published over 170 papers.

In 1950, Barry and his former mentor Thomas Dillon, Ceimic, the first chemistry textbook to be published in Irish. Barry advised Tomás De Bhaldraithe on scientific terms when the later was developing a dictionary of modern Irish, published in 1959.

== Personal life ==
In 1931, Barry married fellow UCD student Angela O'Connor from County Offaly. They had six children and settled in Rathgar, in Dublin, the children taking the surname Du Barra. Their daughter Mairead became a general practitioner in Dalkey.

== Awards and honours ==
Barry held fellowships in the Institute of Chemistry of Ireland, the Royal Academy of Medicine in Ireland, the American Thoracic Society and the Royal Institute of Chemistry. Barry was elected a Member of the Royal Irish Academy in 1944, serving as its treasurer 1962 - 1970 and its president 1970 - 1973.

In 1969, he was awarded the Boyle Medal of the Royal Dublin Society. Barry and his team were awarded the 1980 UNESCO Science Prize for their work.

== Death and commemoration ==
Vincent Barry died on 4 September 1975. His funeral was attended by a large number of people, including by President of Ireland Cearbhall Ó Dálaigh, future President of Ireland Mary Robinson and his regular bus driver on the 47 bus.

In 2008, the Leprosy Mission held an event at the Royal Irish Academy in Dublin to honour the centenary of his birth.
