= Felix Meyer (industrialist) =

German industrialist (1875–1950)

- Born: 1875; Westphalia, Germany
- Died: April 14, 1950 (aged 74–75); Brussels, Belgium
- Occupation: Businessman
- Known for: German Jewish industrialist who helped rescue Jewish people in occupied Belgium
- Spouse: Esther Meyer

Felix Meyer (1875–1950) was a German industrialist of Jewish descent. He turned around and made a success of the family textile factory business in Germany. He was forced out of the business and fled to Belgium at the start of World War II. His son in law and daughter would later emigrate to Ireland.

Mayer and his wife survived the war in Belgium and helped to rescue a number of Jewish people in occupied Belgium. After the end of the war the family would eventually regain control of business bringing it back into family ownership but not before Felix Mayer had died.

== Early years ==
Felix Meyer came from a liberal Jewish family with roots traceable to sixteenth-century Westphalia. His brothers Elias and Moses (later Moritz) established themselves at Aachen, founding a successful textile factory. Moritz Meyer's son, Eduard, joined the firm and married Esther Pauline Salomon in 1874, and their daughter, Else, was born the same year, followed by five other children, of whom Felix, born in 1875, was the eldest, the others being Georg, Dora, Meta, and Erna.

Eduard Meyer's family lived well, in a sixteen-room house, with servants, a large garden, and stables. While they were not religiously fervent, they did not convert to Christianity. In later reminiscences, Felix spoke of a happy, even boisterous, childhood, though the upbringing for the boys in the family was severe, involving regular corporal punishment, though he proved to be an indulgent father. In particular, he left his daughters free to choose their husbands. A rebel at school, he followed his father to the extent of undertaking several technical apprenticeships as a dyer, spinner, and weaver. He also took jobs in several different companies in Germany, but also in England, before joining his father's then-flagging business at the age of 22.

== New Energies ==
The once flourishing firm had not found in Felix's father an entrepreneurial talent to equal the firm's founder, and as Felix put it, ‘...the money disappeared rapidly since nobody knew how to earn it, but only how to spend it’. Felix Meyer rose to the occasion with innovation. For one thing, he invented a twin loom, but the sale of the patent was insufficient to relaunch the factory's fortunes and in 1905 he convinced his father to sell the mill, taking on the remaining debts himself. In 1906, Felix married Marguerite Darmstaedter, a Belgian national, and they set up a home in the Kurs Brunnenstrasse, in Aachen. Though the dwelling was modest, it was near the Cologne-Liège railway and there was a shed that Felix used for developing his inventions, which were many and varied, including forays into mechanics, chemical processes, and even medical appliances. While the definitive number of patents registered under various names is uncertain, it probably reached several hundred, including new designs of a loom, and processes for manufacturing multi-colored yarns or fabrics. Particularly well-known is the instrument known as the Rotameter, a device that measures the volumetric flow rate of fluid in a closed tube. Meyer worked a good deal in exploiting the possible uses of cellulose, with applications in the form of artificial limbs, for which he also constructed new joints. In the 1920s and 1930s, Meyer was occupied with the enhanced manufacture of glass tubes, ampoules, etc. and for filling and sealing these. Already in 1906, the newlyweds could evidently make a living from the success of the inventions. The firm Rotawerke was founded in 1909 and thereafter Meyer heeded the earlier business decline of his family in that he did not draw a salary, but simply fed his own pension fund. A daughter, Kläre (later known as Claire), was born in 1907, and another, Margot, in 1909.

The united German Empire proclaimed in the Hall of Mirrors at Versailles in the aftermath of the Franco-Prussian War followed its destiny, especially during the reign of Kaiser William II, towards becoming a vast militaristic-industrial complex and simultaneously largely losing control of its own foreign policy. When the summer of 1914 saw the outbreak of the First World War, this was hailed with enthusiasm by the patriotic German public, and there was no doubt that the course of events would echo those of the rapid victory of 1870. Felix Meyer was a fervent patriot whose spirit was undaunted by defeat or postwar conditions. The debts from his father's time were finally paid off, and the family and its business prospered. Rotawerke had branches in Belgium and France and business ties to Britain. Meyer was wealthy enough to support young artists.

== The Rude Awakening ==
Meyer remained a German patriot and, like other assimilated Jews of the time, refused to believe that the rise to power of the Nazi party constituted a danger. In Meyer's case, he even returned to Germany in 1938 from a journey to the United States with his wife. That same year, however, events caught up with him, especially after the so-called Kristallnacht of 9–10 November, during which he spent some hours under arrest. This must certainly have been a great shock for Meyer and his wife. He had taken the precaution of carrying a capsule with poison on him and in a letter to his daughters he asked them to show understanding if he or his wife should decide to commit suicide. By the end of the year Meyer had been forced out of the firm under the so-called 'Arianization' process, and its management had been reluctantly taken over for the greater part by his son-in-law John Hennig, husband since 1933 of Meyer's daughter Kläre and with her a convert to Catholicism, in Hennig's case from Lutheranism.

== Emigration of the Meyers and the Hennigs ==
In February 1939 Meyer was allowed to emigrate legally to Belgium, being married to a Belgian woman, and with the complicity of officials he knew. However, already in May Germany invaded the Netherlands and Belgium and the couple failed in an attempt to escape to France. They were now stranded as German Jews in German-occupied Belgium, a situation which lasted till the liberation by the Allies in 1944.

Later that same year, in October 1939, Meyer's son-in-law Hennig emigrated legally to the Irish Free State to prepare a home there for his wife and children, who joined him a month later. Despite the separation and the many difficulties of these years, Felix Meyer and his wife Marguerite maintained a strongly affectionate relationship with their daughter and her family.

== Wartime Belgium ==
In Aachen, Meyer had been a prominent public figure, well known among others to high-ranking army officers. In Nazi-occupied Belgium Something of this status remained and Meyer exploited it in favour of his fellow Jews. He showed remarkable strength of character and a courage that almost defies belief. His exploits included complaining in person to the Gestapo about illegal detention of Jews. In that strange mental world of ice-cold cruelty and pseudo-bureaucratic meticulousness, Meyer succeeded in having well over a hundred Belgian and foreign Jews released one by one, arguing in detail their cases. He also alleviated the conditions of others, sometimes adducing the rights implied by military decorations awarded prior to the advent of Nazism. A man of the world, Meyer exploited the rivalry between committed Nazis and other military and civilian personnel and perhaps, too, the fear that some of his interlocutors had of facing legal retribution after the war. Meyer's initiatives were far from being of benefit solely to small numbers of people, for he arranged shelter and medical care for hundreds.

As to Felix Meyer's humanitarian activities in wartime Belgium, many testimonies are conserved at Jerusalem's Yad Vashem memorial site.

The end of hostilities in Europe brought little immediate alleviation in general conditions, though Meyer fought for his humanitarian projects and at retrieving possession of his family firm, in which he eventually met with success. The struggle may have contributed to his early death, in Brussels on 14 April 1950. He is buried in the Alter Jüdischer Friedhof (Old Jewish Cemetery) Aachen. With him is buried his wife, Esther, who died in 1966.

== The Firm Survives ==
Some years passed before in 1956 the Hennigs took the decision to return to the Continent, largely for the sake of their daughters’ future, but also to allow Hennig to take control of the Meyer business, now restored to family ownership. A plant of the firm, known as Rota, had been established at Säckingen (Bad Säckingen) in Germany, on the southern edge of the Black Forest area. John Hennig took on its management, but the events of the Nazi period were such that the family could not bring itself to refound their family life on German soil. Instead, they took up residence in nearby Basel, Switzerland, Hennig commuting from there over the border daily to manage the firm. The work was not of the kind that Hennig relished, but it ensured the family's financial stability and was in any case seen by him as a duty to the memory of his revered father-in-law. The firm later became a subsidiary of the Japanese Yokogawa group.
