= Patrick Duggan (actor) =

Irish actor (1934–2022)

- Born: 10 March 1934; Clontarf, Dublin, Ireland
- Died: 8 March 2022 (aged 86); Camden Town, London, England
- Occupation: Actor
- Years active: 1950s–2000s

Patrick Augustine Duggan (10 March 1934 – 8 March 2022) was an Irish actor.

== Career ==
Duggan attended Belvedere College before training as an actor at the Gate Theatre in Dublin. He later performed in several plays in the Gate, Abbey and Gaiety theatres as well as touring with productions across Ireland. After relocating to London, Duggan continued his theatre work and also took on roles in several television shows, including Z-Cars, EastEnders and Father Ted. As well as acting, he was also an author and wrote three children's books.

== Personal life and death ==
Duggan was raised in Clontarf, Dublin. He met Charles Zarb when the latter was studying at Trinity College, Dublin in the 1950s and the couple later settled in Belsize Park in London. Duggan and Zarb entered into a civil partnership in November 2007. Duggan died on 8 March 2022 and Zarb died the following month.
