= Belvedere College =

Secondary school in Dublin, Ireland

Belvedere College SJ

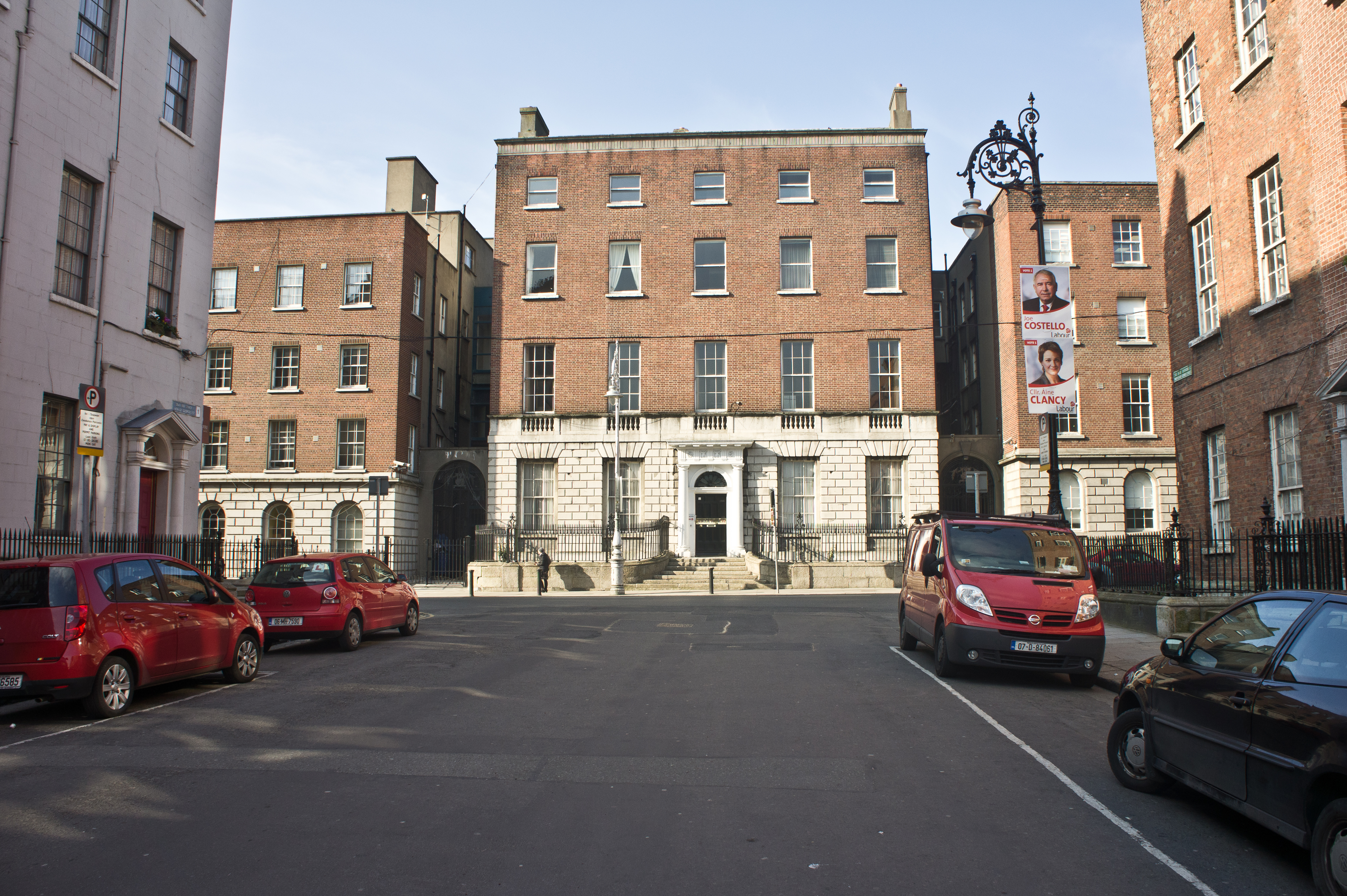
- Belvedere House in 2011

Location
- 6 Great Denmark Street, Dublin 1, D01 TK25, Ireland; 53.355732°N 6.261936°W

Information
- Other name: St Francis Xavier's College
- Type: Voluntary
- Motto: Per vias rectas (By straight paths)
- Religious affiliations: Roman Catholic; Society of Jesus
- Established: 1832; 194 years ago
- Headmaster: Gerry Foley
- Gender: Male
- Enrollment: 1,067
- Colours: Black and white
- Alumni: Old Belvederians
- Website: www.belvederecollege.ie

Belvedere College S.J. is a fee-paying voluntary secondary school for boys in Dublin, Ireland.

Formally established in 1832 at Hardwicke Street in north inner city Dublin, the school was later moved to Belvedere House in 1841 and it is for this building that the school is named. It remains in the same location as of 2026.

The school has numerous notable alumni in the arts, politics, sports, science, business and religion.

Belvedere College also forms the setting for part of James Joyce's semi-autobiographical novel A Portrait of the Artist as a Young Man.

== History ==
Belvedere owes its origins to the efforts of John Austin who opened primary and secondary schools at Saul's Court off Fishamble Street in 1750. The Society of Jesus has been active in the area around Hardwicke Street since 1790. They founded St Francis Xavier's College in the disused Poor Clares convent on Hardwicke Street with nine students in 1832, three years after Catholic emancipation. In 1841, the Jesuits purchased Belvedere House on neighbouring Great Denmark Street, which gave the moved school its new name. George Augustus Rochfort (1738–1814), who became the second Earl of Belvedere in 1774, built Belvedere House in the 1770s, whose interior decoration was carried out by Michael Stapleton, a leading stucco craftsman of his time.

Belvedere was caught up in the events of the 1916 Easter Rising, when it was struck by British artillery shells. The Jesuits at Belvedere and the neighbouring Gardiner Street Community helped the wounded and distributed food across the locality.

A school museum and archive were opened in 2002 by former teacher Oliver Murphy, dedicated to the history of the institution and its past pupils. A book was also launched by Murphy in 2003, The Cruel Clouds of War which detailed the 68 former past pupils who had lost their lives in conflicts of the 20th century. In November 2003, a memorial was officially unveiled in the college by then Rector Fr. Leonard Moloney SJ, dedicated to the 68 former past pupils who had lost their lives during various wars of the 20th century including the Boer Wars, World War I, World War II, Irish War of Independence, Irish Civil War, 1916 rising and the Cyprus Emergency.

In February 2012 Chinese Politburo member and future paramount leader Xi Jinping visited the college as part of his visit to Ireland for a special reception and performance of Riverdance in the O'Reilly theatre. An annual exchange with a Jesuit school in Hong Kong was one of the catalysts for this visit.

=== Abuse of students ===
In 2025, 15 Jesuit priests were named for various physical and sexual abuses of students at the school. Most notable was Father Jack Leonard who was Prefect of Studies (head teacher of the senior school) during the 1960s and early 1970s as well as Father Brendan Kearney and Father Joseph Marmion.

== Education ==
Belvedere offers the Irish Junior Certificate and Leaving Certificate curricula.

=== Classics ===
The school still offers Latin as both a Junior and Leaving Certificate subject and offers Ancient Greek as a Junior and Leaving Certificate subject when there is sufficient demand. Classical Studies is also offered at Leaving Certificate level.

=== Science ===
Garret A. FitzGerald, an Old Belvederian and senior faculty member at the University of Pennsylvania, has instituted an annual five-week scholarship for two students who excel in Transition Year science.

== Facilities ==
Belvedere has a 25-metre 5-lane indoor swimming pool, gym (with markings and equipment for cricket practice, basketball, badminton and volleyball), restaurant and refectory, music suite, learning resource centre, museum and chapel and oratory at its main campus. In addition, its Cabra Sports Ground holds three hard-surface tennis courts, five grass rugby pitches, a cricket field, and a grass soccer pitch, while at Distillery Road there is an astroturf pitch. An astroturf 7-a-side football pitch was built on top of the O'Reilly Theatre, and a 60-metre 8-lane tartan roof-top running track above the Kerr Wing.

The O'Reilly theatre is a professional standard 590-seat theatre with a motorised stage and retractable seating. It is used to stage school plays and musicals but has also been used by RTÉ, TV3 and an assortment of dramatic organisations and hosted live audience TV shows such as The Panel and Tonight with Vincent Browne.

The school also has three computer labs, cabled and wireless networking to every classroom, and other IT features including dedicated networks for the library and certain functions.

In 2004, Belvedere opened the Dargan Moloney Science and Technology Block, which has state-of-the-art laboratories, lecture theatres and IT hubs.

== Extra curricular activities ==
=== Charities ===
The school undertakes a number of charitable activities. Some students travel with the annual Dublin Diocesan, Meath Diocesan and Oblate Pilgrimages to Lourdes, France, to assist the elderly and the disabled. Belvedere's St Vincent de Paul Society is one of the largest among secondary schools in Ireland, organising activities such as old-folks events and a weekly soup run in inner city Dublin. Beginning in 1981, some students have undertaken a charity walk from Dublin to Galway each summer to raise funds for Irish Guide Dogs for the Blind, St Francis Hospice, and The Temple Street Children's University Hospital, located very near the school. The "block-pull", as it is known, has raised over €70,000 in a single event.

An annual charitable fundraising event held by the college is the "Belvedere Sleep-Out", which takes place from 22 to 24 December each year. Students "go homeless" on Dublin's O'Connell Street for three days and two nights. The Sleep-Out is run primarily by students from the college, with the assistance of a number of teachers and past pupils, to raise funds for Focus Ireland, The Home Again Society, and Father Peter McVerry's Society for homeless boys. The students fast for 24 hours during the Sleep-Out. The culmination is Christmas Eve midnight mass in the college chapel. In 2015, the event raised over €189,000 over the Christmas period for the charities. This record was broken in 2016, when the event raised €225,021 for the charities. In 2022, the Belvedere College Sleepout set a new all-time record of over €304,000.

=== Sports ===
Belvedere has the most Royal College of Science Cup (Overall best school in track and field) wins at the Irish Schools Athletics Championships. Belvedere won 15 consecutive Royal College of Science Cup awards between 1999 and 2014.

Field sports are a traditional strength of the school. In October 2013 Belvedere held the all-Ireland schools senior track and field trophy, having won the title in the previous seven years. It also held numerous other titles at provincial levels.

Belvedere has won 35 Leinster Senior Cricket Schools Cup titles, as of 2016.

The school has a strong rugby tradition. In 2005, for the first time in the school's history, it won both the Leinster Junior Cup and the Leinster Schools Senior Cup. In 2024 Belvedere, with twelve titles, stood second in the Leinster Senior Cup roll of honour, behind Blackrock College (71).

=== Drama ===
Drama productions form an integral part of Belvedere's year. Each academic year, there are four performances: a Junior Musical, a Senior Musical, a Drama Society production, and a First Year Play. Productions have included Les Misérables (school edition) in 2004, and the stage adaptation of Philip Pullman's His Dark Materials in 2007. Other productions of note include Bugsy Malone, The Adventures of Roderick Random, David Copperfield, Aladdin, Jesus Christ Superstar, A Funny Thing Happened on the Way to the Forum, The Wind in the Willows, Prince Caspian and The Voyage of the Dawn Treader, Treasure Island, The Lord of the Rings, Joseph and the Amazing Technicolor Dreamcoat, The Addams Family, West Side Storyand The Pirates of Penzance.

In 2016, an original play entitled Children of the Rising was staged at the school. The play was written by a member of staff and was nominated for a Bord Gáis Energy Student Theatre Award for Best Overall Play. The play was based on the book Children of The Rising by Joe Duffy.

=== Debating ===
The school has debating societies in the English, Irish, Spanish, German, and French languages. Belvedere won the all-Ireland schools debating competition in 2005, the Denny Leinster Schools Senior Debating Championship in 2010, the L&H society Leinster Junior debating competition, and also the Alliance Française debating championship and Leinster Irish debating final.

=== Choir and orchestra ===
The school's concert choir hosts an annual Christmas carol service in December, and an annual musical evening in May. The choir have undertaken recordings in RTÉ, and has had successes at both the Feis Ceoil and the Wesley Feis. The college orchestra has also won events at both the Wesley Feis and the Feis Ceoil.

=== Environmental ===
The school has an urban farm, growing vegetables and housing bees. The farm won the Global High Schools Europe category at the Zayed Future Energy Prize in 2017.

== Culture ==
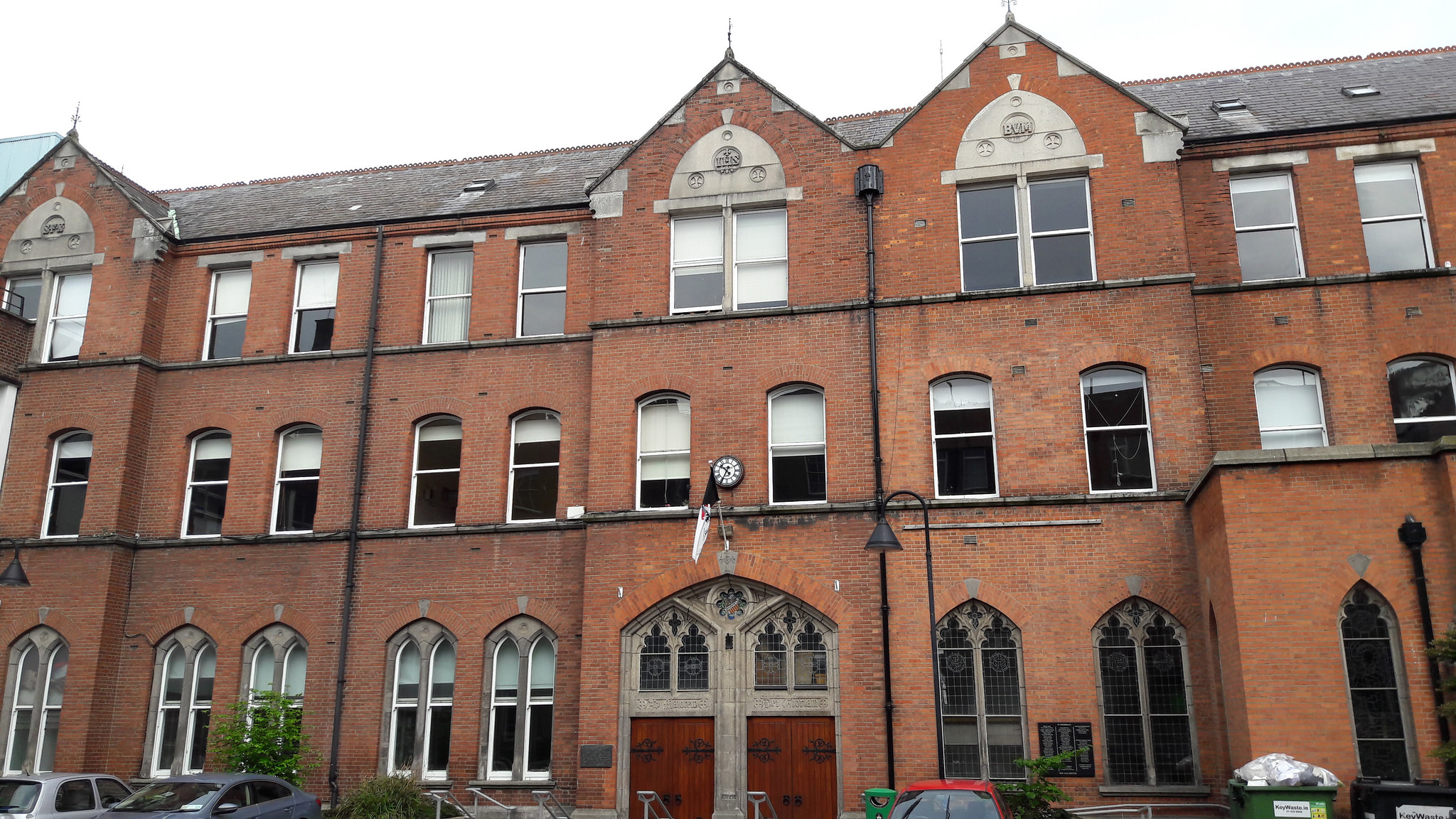
Inner Yard Buildings

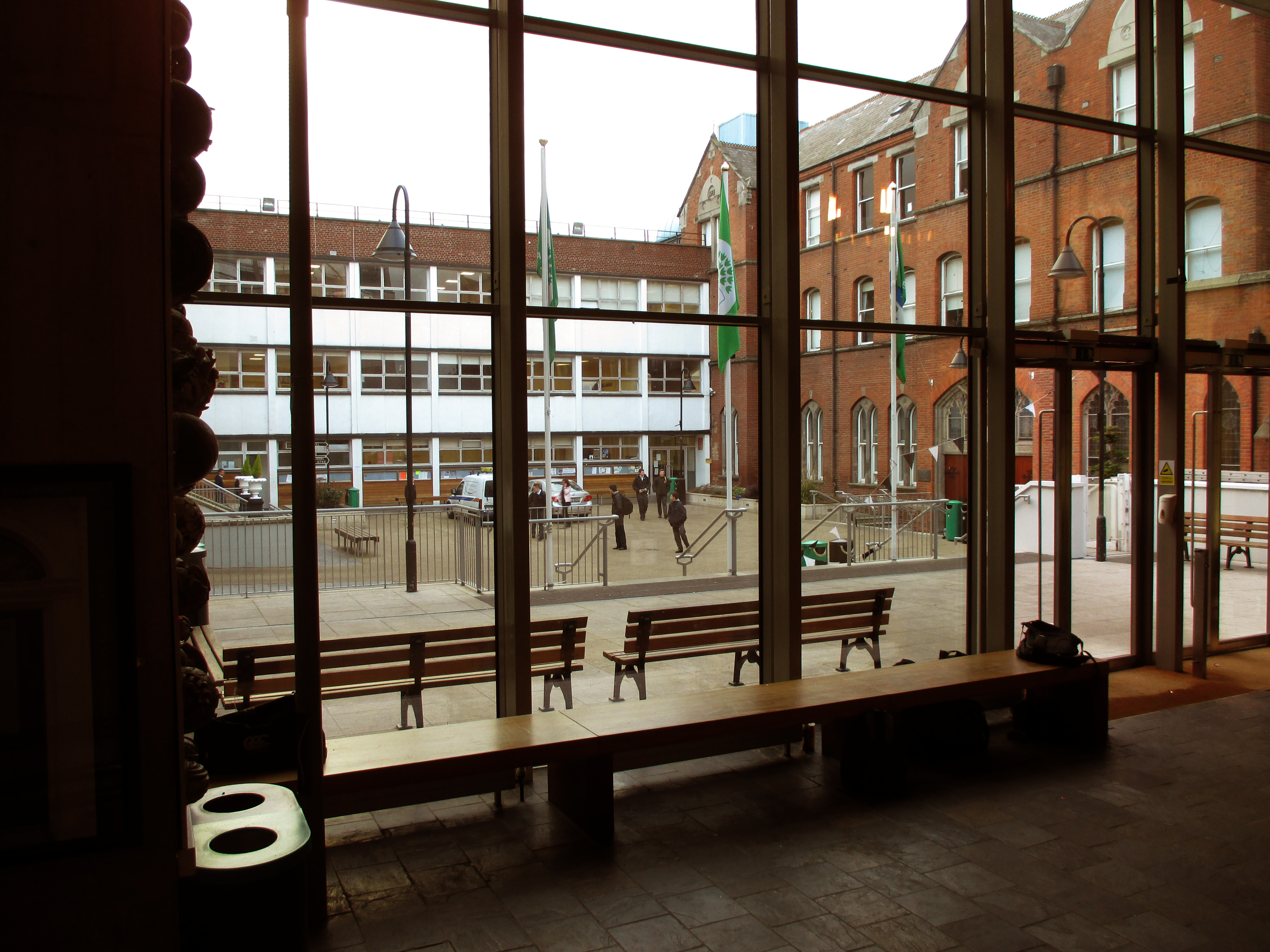
Belvedere College SJ. View from the Dargan-Maloney Science and technology block, into the yard.

Belvedere College is run by the Jesuit order. Most of the school's teaching staff are laypersons, although a number of Jesuit priests and brothers assist with administration and chaplaincy.

The school motto is Per Vias Rectas – "By Straight Paths" – and the college aspires to produce "Men for Others". Students often write "AMDG" for Ad maiorem Dei gloriam, "For the greater glory of God", the motto of the Society of Jesus, on the top left of pages of their copybooks. They formerly also wrote "LDSetBVM" or Laus Deo Semper et Beatae Virgini Mariae ("Praise to God forever and to the Blessed Virgin Mary") on the bottom right of the same page.

The students are assigned to one of six lines or houses, mainly named after Jesuits who were either notable or had an association with Belvedere: Loyola, Xavier, Aylmer, Kenney, Finlay and Scully (previously named Dempsey after George Dempsey). Years are named after the progression in the Jesuit Ratio Studiorum: Elements, Rudiments, Grammar, Syntax, Poetry, and Rhetoric. Each form except Rhetoric has a captain and vice-captain.

The school's yearbook is The Belvederian. The term "Belvederian" is also sometimes used to refer to current students and "Old Belvederian" (OB) for alumni. Old Belvederians normally refer to their graduation by using "OB" followed by their final year in the college, for example, "OB 1984".

Belvedere College is the backdrop for some of James Joyce's novel A Portrait of the Artist as a Young Man. It is a semi-autobiographical piece of work and the teacher, Mr Tate, was based on Joyce's own English teacher, George Dempsey. In the book, Joyce mentions his involvement in the College Opera which continues today. In 1884, James Aloysius Cullen was appointed spiritual father at Belvedere, a position he retained for twenty years while also engaged in other ministry. Cullen was the founder and director of the Sodality of Our Lady at the college, which duties included counselling students. In 1896, James Joyce was elected Student Prefect of the Society. According to Neil R. Davison, the sermons in Chapter III of A Portrait of the Artist are modelled on those given by Cullen during a retreat held in 1897.

== Notable alumni ==
Alumni and teachers played major roles in modern Irish literature (James Joyce, Austin Clarke, Jack Barry. the foundation of Ireland's National Theatre), the standardisation of the Irish language (de Bhaldraithe), as well as the Irish independence movement – both the 1916 Rising (Joseph Mary Plunkett, Éamon de Valera) and the Irish War of Independence (Éamon de Valera, Cathal Brugha, Kevin Barry). The school's notable alumni and former faculty include two Taoisigh (Irish prime minister), one Ceann Comhairle (Speaker of the Lower House of the Irish Parliament), several cabinet ministers, one Blessed, one Cardinal, one Archbishop, one signatory of the Proclamation of the Irish Republic, two Supreme Court Justices, one Olympic medallist, thirty Irish international rugby players and numerous notable figures in the world of the arts, academia and business.

=== The arts ===
- Thomas Bodkin – Director of the National Gallery of Ireland (1927–35)
- Francis Browne – photographer
- Austin Clarke – poet
- Harry Clarke – artist
- Tim Pat Coogan – historian and journalist
- Denis Devlin – poet
- Owen Dudley Edwards – historian and literary expert on Oscar Wilde, Arthur Conan Doyle and P.G. Wodehouse
- Patrick Duggan – actor
- William Fay – co-founder of the Abbey Theatre
- Jimmy Glover – composer
- Mark Greaney and Fergal Matthews – members of indie rock band JJ72
- James Joyce – writer
- Donagh MacDonagh – poet, playwright, broadcaster, folklorist, and district justice
- Eoin Macken - model and actor
- Hugh Maguire – violinist
- Niall Montgomery - Artist
- John O'Conor – pianist and Beethoven master
- Jimmy O'Dea – actor
- Liam O'Flaherty – writer
- Conal O'Riordan – writer
- Jack Reynor – actor
- Rejjie Snow – rapper
- Mervyn Wall – writer
- Leo Whelan - painter

=== Irish history, politics ===
- Kevin Barry – Irish republican (did not graduate)
- Cathal Brugha – Irish republican (did not graduate)
- Richard Bruton – Fine Gael TD Deputy Leader of Fine Gael & Government Minister
- Jack Chambers – Fianna Fáil TD Deputy Leader of Fianna Fail & Government Minister
- Garret FitzGerald – Fine Gael Taoiseach former Leader of Fine Gael
- Barry Heneghan – independent TD for Dublin Bay North
- Brothers Brian Lenihan and Conor Lenihan – Fianna Fáil Teachtaí Dála (TD)
- James McNeill – Governor General of the Irish Free State
- William Martin Murphy – Member of Parliament (MP)
- Cian O'Callaghan – member of the Social Democrats(TD) for Dublin Bay North
- Chris O'Malley – Fine Gael Member of European Parliament (MEP), 1986–89
- Joseph Mary Plunkett – rebel; signatory of 1916 Proclamation; executed a month later

=== Legal ===
- Arthur Cox – founder of eponymous law firm and member of the Seanad
- William FitzGerald (Irish judge) - former chief justice of Ireland
- Timothy Sullivan (Irish judge) - former chief justice of Ireland
- Adrian Hardiman – former supreme court judge
- Brian Walsh (judge) – former supreme court judge
- Michael Joseph Hogan - Chief Justice of the Supreme Court of Hong Kong for 14 years
- Kevin Dixon - Attorney General of Ireland from 1942 – 1946
- Séamus Woulfe – Attorney General of Ireland from 2017 - 2020

=== Irish language ===
- Tomás de Bhaldraithe – lexicographer
- Lambert McKenna – lexicographer, editor, educationist, and former principal of Belvedere College

=== Science and academia ===
- John Gabriel Byrne - first professor of computer science in Trinity College Dublin
- Myles Dillon – Celticist, President of the Royal Irish Academy
- Desmond Fennell - writer, cultural philosopher and linguist
- Garret A. FitzGerald – Professor of Medicine and Systems Pharmacology and Translational Therapeutics, Perelman School of Medicine, University of Pennsylvania
- Peter Lalor
- Fergus O'Rourke – zoologist
- Frank Winder – biochemist, vice-president of the Royal Irish Academy

=== Religion ===
- Cardinal Desmond Connell – Archbishop of Dublin and Primate of Ireland
- Columba Marmion (1858–1923) – Abbot of the Maredsous Abbey (Belgium)
- Malachi Martin – priest, author
- Robert Dermot O'Flanagan – Bishop of Juneau
- Archbishop Dermot Ryan – Archbishop of Dublin and Primate of Ireland

=== Rugby ===
- Ollie Campbell – rugby union
- Andrew Clinch (1867–1937) – rugby union Irish international 10 caps, President of Irish Rugby Football Union
- Thomas Crean – rugby union and military; and his nephew Cyril Patrick Crean MBE
- Eugene Davy – rugby union and founder of the Davy Group with his brother James
- Andrew Dunne – rugby union, cricket
- Cian Healy – rugby union
- David Hawkshaw - rugby union
- George J Morgan – rugby union
- Karl Mullen – rugby union
- Tony O'Reilly – rugby union and business as head of Heinz and Independent News and Media and former chairman of Waterford Wedgwood
- David Shanahan - Current Ulster Rugby player

=== Other sports ===
- Paul Corry – soccer
- Kevin Grogan - soccer
- James McGee - tennis player
- Frank Miller - cricketer
- Alec O'Riordan – cricketer
- Cathal Pendred – retired mixed martial artist in the UFC and actor
- Pat Taaffe Cheltenham Gold Cup winner on the horse Arkle and Tom Taaffe - jockey and trainer
- Frank Winder – rock climbing

=== Olympians ===
- Peter Coghlan - 110 metres hurdles at Sydney 2000
- Brian Fay - 5,000m at Paris 2024
- Scott Flanigan - sailing at London 2012
- Barry Murphy – London 2012 in swimming
- Cian O'Connor – (Athens 2004, London 2012, Tokyo 2021, Paris 2024 – equestrian)
- Noel Purcell – water polo, rugby union, international rugby union referee and Olympian separately with Great Britain at Antwerp 1920 and with Ireland at Paris 1924.
- Lexie Tynan - 200m at Helsinki 1952

=== Gaelic sports ===
- Seán Boylan – former Meath GAA football manager, international rules coach and traditional medical herbalist
- Ger Brennan – Former Dublin and St.Vincents GAA player and member of the 2003 Senior Rugby team 1st XV
- Dr. Jack McCaffrey – GAA, 2015 FOTY and Clontarf GAA player

=== Architecture ===
- Alfred Edwin Jones – architect
- Michael Scott – architect who established Scott Tallon Walker
- Sam Stephenson – architect who established Stephenson, Gibney & Associates
- Edward McParland - founder of the Irish Architectural Archive

=== Broadcasting ===
- John Bowman – broadcaster
- Ian Dempsey – radio DJ with Today FM (Did not graduate)
- Henry Kelly – BBC and RTE television presenter, radio disc jockey and the person on whom the character Henry Sellers in Father Ted was based
- Anton Savage – TV and Radio Host and PR advisor
- Sir Terry Wogan – BBC and RTE broadcaster

=== Peers ===
- Edward Pakenham, Lord Silchester
- Thomas Pakenham, 8th Earl of Longford – historian

=== Other ===
- Arthur Beveridge - British military officer and Military Cross Holder, Norwegian War Cross holder and honorary physician to George VI
- Edward Joseph Garland - Canadian member of parliament for Alberta and diplomat
- William Russell Grace - first Roman Catholic Mayor of New York City and founder of W. R. Grace and Company

== Notable faculty ==
- Phil Conway - Former PE teacher who competed for Ireland at the 1972 Summer Olympics in Munich in the Shot Put
- George Dempsey – model for Mr. Tate in Joyce's Portrait of an Artist and after whom a stream class "Dempsey" was named for a number of years
- Éamon de Valera – Irish statesman (1882–1975)
- John Hennig - worked as a teacher for a period during the 1940s
- Peter McVerry - homelessness campaigner in Dublin
- Michael Morrison - photographer at the liberation of Bergen Belsen concentration camp

== See also ==
- List of Jesuit schools
- List of Jesuit sites in Ireland
- List of alumni of Jesuit educational institutions
