= Stephen Hero =

Unpublished novel by James Joyce

- First edition
- Author: James Joyce
- Cover artist: N. I. Cannon
- Language: English
- Genre: Autobiographical, Modernism
- Publisher: Jonathan Cape
- Publication date: 1944
- Media type: Print (Hardback & Paperback)
- Followed by: A Portrait of the Artist as a Young Man

Stephen Hero is a posthumously published autobiographical novel by Irish author James Joyce. It is the early version of A Portrait of the Artist as a Young Man. Its published form reflects only a portion of the manuscript: the first 518 pages have disappeared; 383 pages remain.

== Background ==
Work on Stephen Hero probably began in Dublin in 1903, although some scholarship suggests a date between 1904 and 1906. According to Derek Attridge, it was to be "a thinly disguised autobiography, stylistically undistinguished and immensely long."

Joyce abandoned the work in Trieste in 1905. It was left among manuscripts given to the care of his brother Stanislaus when Joyce moved to Paris, who later sent it back to him. Sylvia Beach, to whom Joyce later gave the surviving pages, wrote that, "When the manuscript came back to its author, after the twentieth publisher had rejected it, he threw it in the fire, from which Mrs. Joyce, at the risk of burning her hands, rescued these pages." Biographer Herbert Gorman supported this claim which has been widely reported. It has been noted that no surviving parts of the manuscript have any signs of burning. This surviving portion, missing the first 518 pages, was published in 1944. Stanislaus Joyce retained a separate portion of the manuscript which include a self-contained episode that would later be developed into a scene in A Portrait of the Artist as a Young Man: This section was later rediscovered and published in 1955. Five additional pages were of this additional section later came to light in 1959 and were later reintegrated into the additional scene in 1963.

== Literary theory ==
Joyce introduced the concept of “epiphany” in Stephen Hero to preface a discussion of Thomas Aquinas’s three criteria of beauty, wholeness, harmony, and radiance: when the object “seems to us radiant, [it] achieves its epiphany.” The term isn’t used when Stephen Dedalus covers the same ground in A Portrait of the Artist as a Young Man. Editor Theodore Spencer wrote in his introduction to the published edition of the manuscript that only in Stephen Hero does Joyce explicate an esthetic theory that pervades all of his other works. He points to the following passage:

Stephen as he passed on his quest heard the following fragment of colloquy out of which he received an impression keen enough to afflict his sensitiveness very severely.…This triviality made him think of collecting many such moments together in a book of epiphanies. By an epiphany he meant a sudden spiritual manifestation, whether in the vulgarity of speech or of gesture or in a memorable phase of the mind itself. He believed it was for the man of letters to record these epiphanies with extreme care, seeing that they themselves are the most delicate and evanescent of moments.

There’s a reference to Stephen Dedalus’s collection of epiphanies in Ulysses. Joyce himself recorded over seventy epiphanies, of which forty have survived.

William York Tindall has suggested that in Dubliners the concept is the basis of an overall narrative strategy, "the commonplace things of Dublin [becoming] embodiments or symbols . . . of paralysis". Another critic has said of A Portrait that "in at least three instances an epiphany helps Stephen decide on the future courses of this life". She has also identified four distinct epiphany techniques in Joyce's work, noting their use in Ulysses, from the simplest device, such as the revelation of Gerty Macdowell's limp, to the more complex, such as the bowl symbolism in "Telemachus". Cited as an example of Joyce's major epiphany technique—quidditas produced directly—is the revelation of Molly Bloom as "female essence".

Australian scholar S. L. Goldberg has argued that interior monologue in Ulysses is rooted in Joyce's epiphany technique. For Goldberg, the epiphany is "the real artistic (and dramatic) unit of Joyce's 'stream-of-consciousness' writing. What he renders dramatically are minds engaged in the apprehension of epiphanies—the elements of meaning apprehended in life."
