= Uncle Charles Principle =

Narrative procedure used by James Joyce

Uncle Charles Principle, according to Canadian literary critic Hugh Kenner, is a narrative procedure used by Irish writer James Joyce in several of his books. In his study Joyce's Voices, Kenner analyzes in depth the use of this technique throughout the novel Ulysses. Joyce uses the "Uncle Charles Principle" to represent two roles in the novel, that of its protagonist, Leopold Bloom, and that of the classic literary narrator. The procedure, however, receives its name from a character in another of Joyce's novels: A Portrait of the Artist as a Young Man. Joyce acknowledged having been inspired by the work Les lauriers sont coupés by the French writer Édouard Dujardin.

== Explanation ==
This technique is a Joycean version of the free indirect style and is related to the very discussed "objectivity" of the author. According to Kenner, "This is apparently something new in fiction, the normally neutral narrative vocabulary pervaded by a little cloud of idioms which a character might use if he were managing the narrative. In Joyce's various extensions of this device we have one clue to the manifold styles of Ulysses." For this reason, Kenner claims, Joyce seems to use a much less "objective" narrator than it seems at first glance. This creates a major technical problem for the writer, since it is difficult for him to differentiate Leopold Bloom's inner speech (the stream of conciousness) from his own as narrator, so that the reader can confuse the writer's judgments with those of his main character.

Through the "Uncle Charles Principle" the character (or his point of view) usurps inadvertently in certain places the function of the narrator, or, in other words, the narrator, in order to strengthen expressiveness, uses to tell his story turns that would only use the character. Joyce writes in A Portrait of the Artist as a Young Man that Uncle Charles went (the term she used was "repaired", a rather vulgar or archaic word in English) to her toilet, when, in the same circumstances, a classic narrator would have resorted to a more cultured term, or "narrative", as "was heading to". This bias confused the writer Wyndham Lewis when he read this passage in A Portrait, criticizing it as a vulgar license. It was precisely this wrong version of Lewis that served as a pretext to Kenner for his study. For example, in the Spanish translation of A Portrait, by Dámaso Alonso, this expressive Joycean nuance is lost, since Alonso proposed a simple "se encaminaba a" ("headed to") by "repaired".

Joyce used the "Uncle Charles Principle" continuously in Ulysses, but, in addition to A Portrait, he had already used it in the book of stories Dubliners, specifically in the story "The Dead": "Lily, the caretaker's daughter, was literally run off her feet". This "literally", according to Hugh Kenner, means what Lily herself would say, and not the classical literary narrator.

The "Uncle Charles Principle" soon became a very characteristic technique of literary modernism. Virginia Woolf, for example, thoroughly experimented with its possibilities in her novel To the Lighthouse.

This resource has become common literary use in all educated languages worldwide. Joyce powerfully influenced writers in Spanish such as Miguel Ángel Asturias and Juan Rulfo. This one, in his masterful collection of stories El Llano en llamas, and Asturias, in Hombres de maíz, consciously or not, adapted the Joycean "Uncle Charles Principle", making their narrators transfigure linguistically in the peasant, the indigenous or in the indigenism they tried to portray.

== See also ==
- Free indirect speech

== Bibliography ==
- Kenner, Hugh (2007). Joyce's Voices. London: Dalkey Archive Press. ISBN 978-1-57478-428-5.
- Joyce, James (1998). Dublineses. Traducción de Eduardo Chamorro, introducción de Fernando Galván. Madrid: Cátedra. ISBN 978-84-376-1178-5.
- — (1978). Retrato del artista adolescente. Traducción de Dámaso Alonso. Madrid: Alianza. ISBN 978-84-206-1698-8.
- — (2007). Ulises. Introducción de Francisco García Tortosa, traducción de Francisco García Tortosa y Mª Luisa Venegas Lagüéns. Madrid: Cátedra. ISBN 979-84-376-1725-1.
