= George Dempsey (diplomat) =

American former diplomat

George Dempsey is an American former diplomat. He served in Madrid, Vienna, Geneva (in the United Nations), The Hague, Dublin, and Caracas before retiring. He wrote the book From the Embassy about his experiences.

During his tenure in Ireland, the Irish Phoenix magazine alleged he was a covert CIA agent. Dempsey took a court case against the magazine, which ended in their retraction of the allegation.

He graduated from University of California, Berkeley, Harvard University, and Oxford University.
