= A Portrait of the Artist as a Young Man =

1916 novel by James Joyce

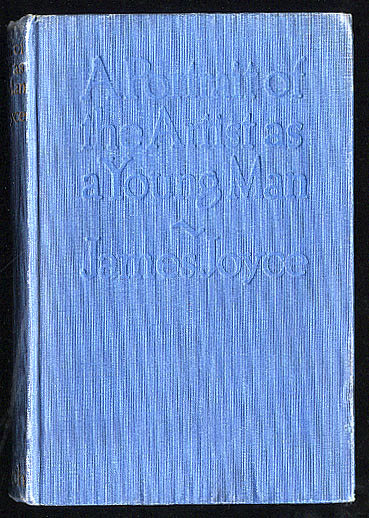
- Front cover of the first edition, published by B. W. Huebsch in 1916
- Author: James Joyce
- Language: English
- Genre: Künstlerroman, modernism
- Set in: Dublin and Clongowes Wood College, c. 1890s
- Published: 29 December 1916
- Publisher: B. W. Huebsch
- Media type: Print: hardback
- Pages: 299
- Dewey Decimal: 823.912
- LC Class: PR6019 .O9
- Preceded by: Stephen Hero
- Followed by: Ulysses
- Text: A Portrait of the Artist as a Young Man at Wikisource

A Portrait of the Artist as a Young Man is the second book and first novel of Irish writer James Joyce, published in 1916. A Künstlerroman written in a modernist style, it traces the religious and intellectual awakening of young Stephen Dedalus, Joyce's fictional alter ego, whose surname alludes to Daedalus, Greek mythology's consummate craftsman. Stephen questions and rebels against the Catholic and Irish conventions under which he has grown, culminating in his self-exile from Ireland to Europe. The work uses techniques that Joyce developed more fully in Ulysses (1922) and Finnegans Wake (1939).

A Portrait began life in 1904 as Stephen Hero—a projected 63-chapter autobiographical novel in a realistic style. After 25 chapters, Joyce abandoned Stephen Hero in 1907 and set to reworking its themes and protagonist into a condensed five-chapter novel, dispensing with strict realism and making extensive use of free indirect speech that allows the reader to peer into Stephen's developing consciousness. American modernist poet Ezra Pound had the novel serialised in the English literary magazine The Egoist in 1914 and 1915, and published as a book in 1916 by B. W. Huebsch of New York. The publication of A Portrait and the short story collection Dubliners (1914) earned Joyce a place at the forefront of literary modernism.

== Background ==
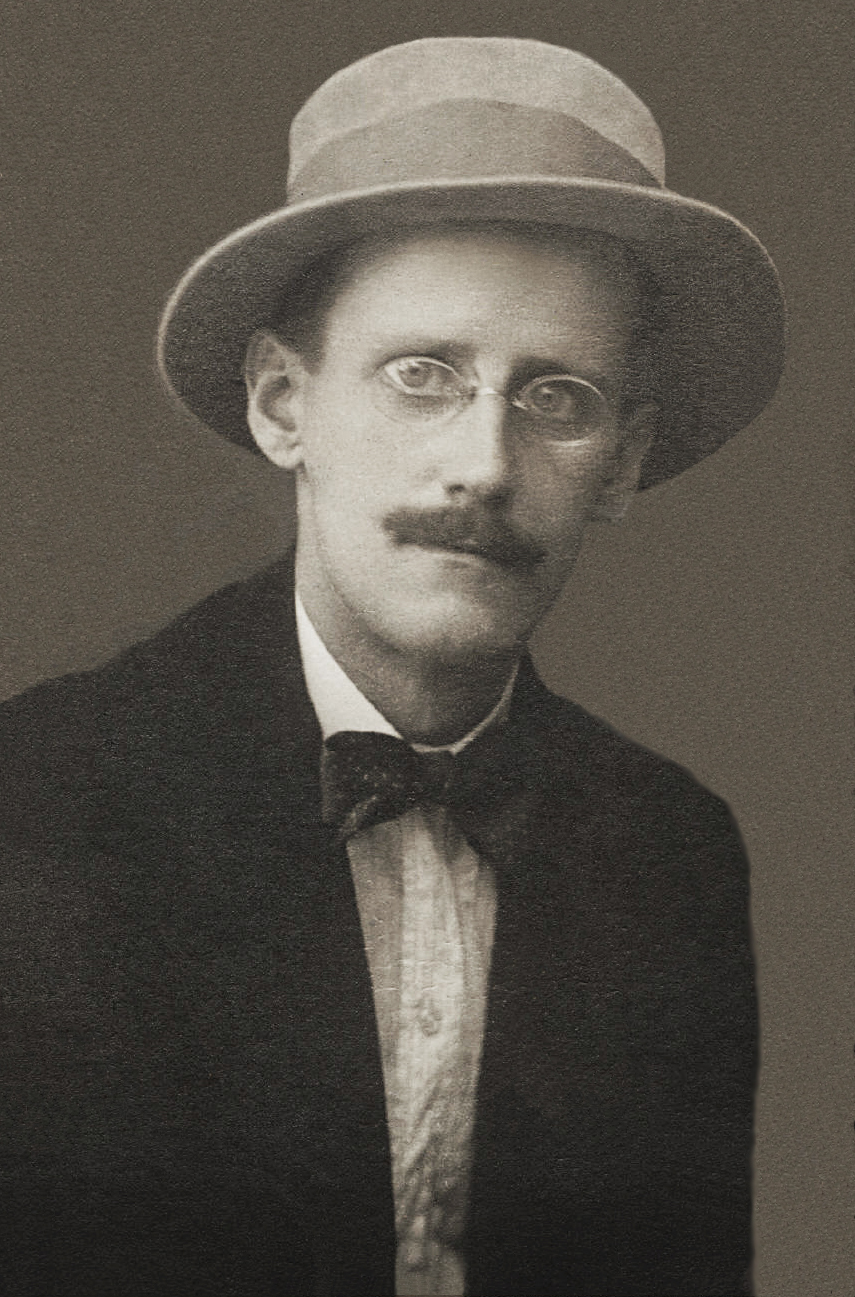
James Joyce in 1915

Born into a middle-class family in Dublin, Ireland, James Joyce (1882–1941) excelled as a student, graduating from University College, Dublin, in 1902. He moved to Paris to study medicine, but soon gave it up. He returned to Ireland at his family's request as his mother was dying of cancer. Despite her pleas, the impious Joyce and his brother Stanislaus refused to make confession or take communion, and when she passed into a coma they refused to kneel and pray for her. After a stretch of failed attempts to get published and launch his own newspaper, Joyce then took jobs teaching, singing and reviewing books.

Joyce made his first attempt at a novel, Stephen Hero, in early 1904. That June he saw Nora Barnacle for the first time walking along Nassau Street. Their first date was on June 16, the same date that his novel Ulysses takes place. Almost immediately, Joyce and Nora were infatuated with each other and they bonded over their shared disapproval of Ireland and the Church. Nora and Joyce eloped to continental Europe, first staying in Zürich before settling for ten years in Trieste (then in Austria-Hungary), where he taught English. There Nora gave birth to their children, Giorgio in 1905 and Lucia in 1907, and Joyce wrote fiction, signing some of his early essays and stories "Stephen Daedalus". The short stories he wrote made up the collection Dubliners (1914), which took about eight years to be published due to its controversial nature. While waiting for Dubliners to be published, Joyce reworked the core themes of the novel Stephen Hero he had begun in Ireland in 1904 and abandoned in 1907 into A Portrait, published in 1916, a year after he had moved back to Zürich in the midst of the First World War.

== Composition ==
Et ignotas animum dimittit in artes.
("And he turned his mind to unknown arts.")

— Ovid, epigraph to A Portrait of the Artist as a Young Man

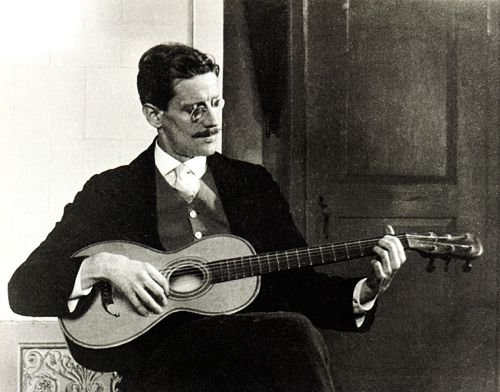
James Joyce in 1915

At the request of its editors, Joyce submitted a work of philosophical fiction entitled "A Portrait of the Artist" to the Irish literary magazine Dana on 7 January 1904. Dana's editor, W. K. Magee, rejected it, telling Joyce, "I can't print what I can't understand." On his 22nd birthday, 2 February 1904, Joyce began a realist autobiographical novel, Stephen Hero, which incorporated aspects of the aesthetic philosophy expounded in A Portrait. He worked on the book until mid-1905 and brought the manuscript with him when he moved to Trieste that year. Though his main attention turned to the stories that made up Dubliners, Joyce continued to work on Stephen Hero. At 914 manuscript pages, Joyce considered the book about half-finished, having completed 25 of its 63 intended chapters. In September 1907, however, he abandoned it, and began a complete revision of the text and its structure, producing what became A Portrait of the Artist as a Young Man. By 1909 the work had taken shape and Joyce showed some of the draft chapters to Ettore Schmitz, one of his language students, as an exercise. Schmitz, himself a respected writer, was impressed and with his encouragement Joyce continued to work on the book.

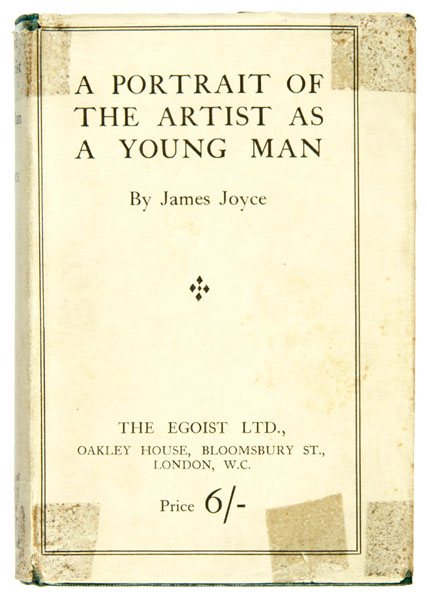

In 1911, Joyce flew into a fit of rage over the continued refusals by publishers to print Dubliners and threw the manuscript of Portrait into the fire. It was saved by a "family fire brigade" including his sister Eileen. (Note: The story is sometimes erroneously repeated as involving Stephen Hero and Joyce's common-law wife, Nora Barnacle. The error was first publicised by Joyce's patron Sylvia Beach in 1935, and was included in Herbert Gorman's biography James Joyce (1939).) Chamber Music, a book of Joyce's poems, was published in 1907.

Joyce recycled the two earlier attempts at explaining his aesthetics and youth, "A Portrait of the Artist" and Stephen Hero, as well as his notebooks from Trieste concerning the philosophy of Thomas Aquinas; they all came together in five carefully paced chapters.

Stephen Hero is written from the point of view of an omniscient third-person narrator, but in A Portrait Joyce adopts the free indirect style, a change that reflects the moving of the narrative centre of consciousness firmly and uniquely onto Stephen. Persons and events take their significance from Stephen, and are perceived from his point of view. Characters and places are no longer mentioned simply because the young Joyce had known them. Salient details are carefully chosen and fitted into the aesthetic pattern of the novel.

The transition from Stephen Hero to A Portrait has been characterized as a radical, uncompromising act of refinement: "[T]he original elements of Joyce's first novel, particularly the characters, are subjected to a process of compression and distillation that rejects all irrelevancies, all particularities and ambiguities, and leaves only their pure essence."

== Publication history ==
In 1913, W. B. Yeats sent the poem I Hear an Army by James Joyce to Ezra Pound, who was assembling an anthology of Imagist verse entitled Des Imagistes. Pound wrote to Joyce, and in 1914 Joyce submitted the first chapter of the unfinished Portrait to Pound, who was so taken with it that he pressed to have the work serialised in the London literary magazine The Egoist. Joyce hurried to complete the novel, and it appeared in The Egoist in twenty-five installments from 2 February 1914 to 1 September 1915.

There was difficulty finding a British publisher for the finished novel, so Pound arranged for its publication by an American publishing house, B. W. Huebsch, which issued it on 29 December 1916. The Egoist Press republished it in the United Kingdom on 12 February 1917 and Jonathan Cape took over its publication in 1924. In 1964 Viking Press issued a corrected version overseen by Chester Anderson that drew upon Joyce's manuscript, list of corrections, and marginal corrections to proof sheets. This edition is "Widely regarded as reputable and the 'standard' edition." As of 2004, the fourth printing of the Everyman's Library edition, the Bedford edition, and the Oxford World's Classics edition used this text. Garland released a "copy text" edition by Hans Walter Gabler in 1993.

== Major characters ==
- Stephen Dedalus – The main character of A Portrait of the Artist as a Young Man. Growing up, Stephen goes through long phases of hedonism and deep religiosity. He eventually adopts a philosophy of aestheticism, greatly valuing beauty and art. Stephen is essentially Joyce's alter ego, and many of the events of Stephen's life mirror events from Joyce's own youth. His surname is taken from the ancient Greek mythical figure Daedalus, who also engaged in a struggle for autonomy.
- Simon Dedalus – Stephen's father, an impoverished former medical student with a strong sense of Irish nationalism. Sentimental about his past, Simon Dedalus frequently reminisces about his youth. Loosely based on Joyce's own father and their relationship.
- Mary Dedalus – Stephen's mother who is very religious and often argues with Stephen about attending services.
- Emma Clery – Stephen's beloved, the young girl to whom he is fiercely attracted over the course of many years. Stephen constructs Emma as an ideal of femininity, even though (or because) he does not know her well.
- Charles Stewart Parnell – An Irish political leader who is not an actual character in the novel, but whose death influences many of its characters. Parnell had powerfully led the Irish Parliamentary Party until he was driven out of public life after his affair with a married woman was exposed.
- Cranly – Stephen's best friend at university, in whom he confides some of his thoughts and feelings. In this sense Cranly represents a secular confessor for Stephen. Eventually Cranly begins to encourage Stephen to conform to the wishes of his family and to try harder to fit in with his peers, advice that Stephen fiercely resents. Towards the conclusion of the novel he bears witness to Stephen's exposition of his aesthetic philosophy. It is partly due to Cranly that Stephen decides to leave, after witnessing Cranly's budding (and reciprocated) romantic interest in Emma.
- Dante (Mrs. Riordan) – The governess of the Dedalus children. She is very intense and a dedicated Catholic.
- Lynch – Stephen's friend from university who has a rather dry personality.

== Synopsis ==
Once upon a time and a very good time it was there was a moocow coming down along the road and this moocow that was coming down along the road met a nicens little boy named baby tuckoo ...

His father told him that story: his father looked at him through a glass: he had a hairy face.

He was baby tuckoo. The moocow came down the road where Betty Byrne lived: she sold lemon platt.

— James Joyce, opening to A Portrait of the Artist as a Young Man

The childhood of Stephen Dedalus is recounted using vocabulary that changes as he grows, in a voice not his own but sensitive to his feelings. The reader experiences Stephen's fears and bewilderment as he comes to terms with the world in a series of disjointed episodes. Stephen attends the Jesuit-run Clongowes Wood College, where the apprehensive, intellectually gifted boy suffers the ridicule of his classmates while he learns the schoolboy codes of behaviour. While he cannot grasp their significance, at a Christmas dinner he is witness to the social, political and religious tensions in Ireland involving Charles Stewart Parnell, which drive wedges between members of his family, leaving Stephen with doubts over which social institutions he can place his faith. Back at Clongowes, word spreads that a number of older boys have been caught "smugging" (the term refers to the secret homosexual horseplay that five students were caught at); discipline is tightened, and the Jesuits increase use of corporal punishment. Stephen is strapped when one of his instructors believes he has broken his glasses to avoid studying, but, prodded by his classmates, Stephen works up the courage to complain to the rector, Father Conmee, who assures him there will be no such recurrence, leaving Stephen with a sense of triumph.

Stephen's father gets into debt and the family leaves its pleasant suburban home to live in Dublin. Stephen realises that he will not return to Clongowes. However, thanks to a scholarship obtained for him by Father Conmee, Stephen is able to attend Belvedere College, where he excels academically and becomes a class leader. Stephen squanders a large cash prize from school, and begins to see prostitutes, as distance grows between him and his drunken father.

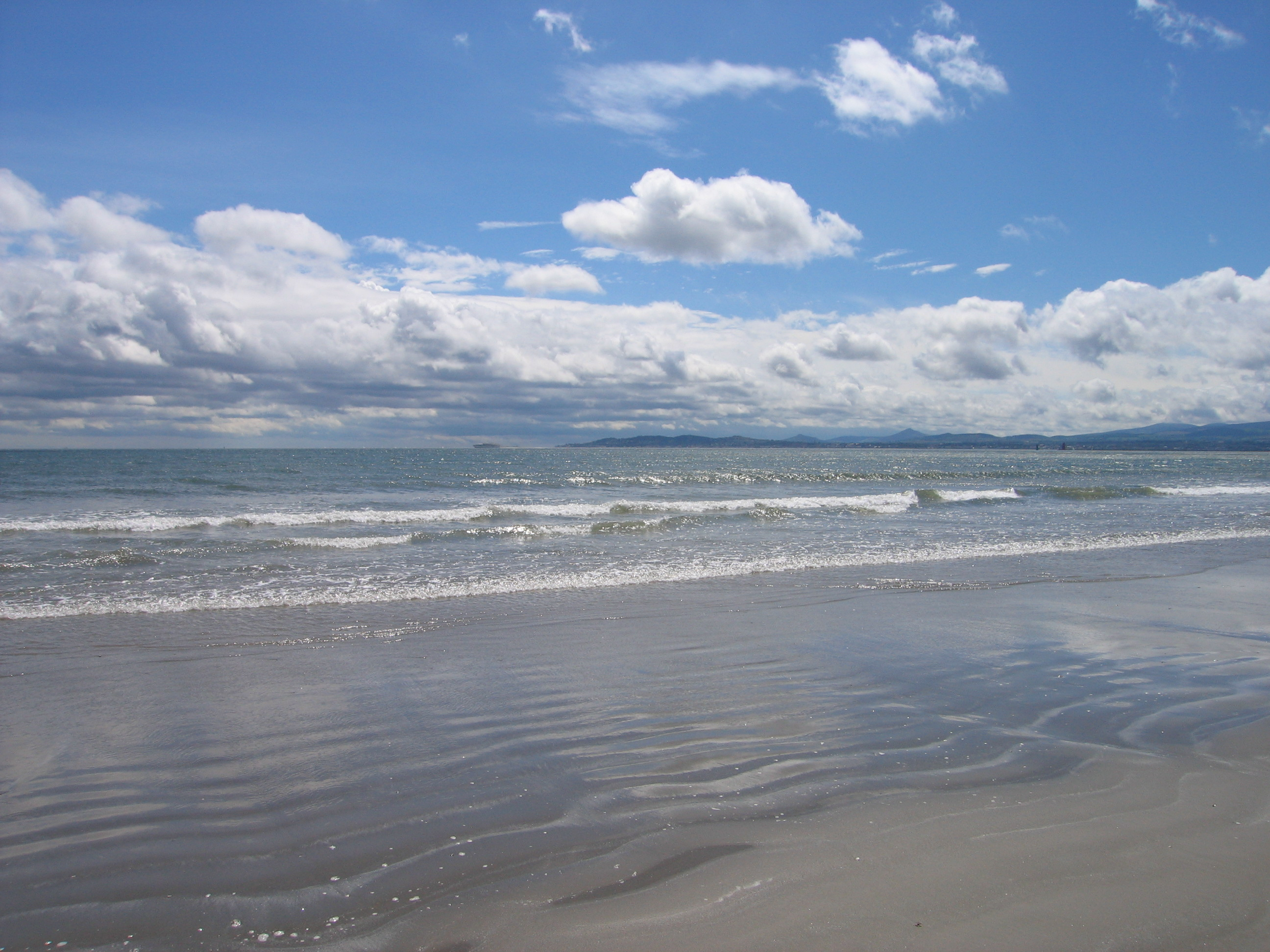
Stephen Dedalus has an aesthetic epiphany along Dollymount Strand.

As Stephen abandons himself to sensual pleasures, his class is taken on a religious retreat, where the boys sit through sermons. Stephen pays special attention to those on pride, guilt, punishment and the Four Last Things (death, judgement, Hell, and Heaven). He feels that the words of the sermon, describing horrific eternal punishment in hell, are directed at himself and, overwhelmed, comes to desire forgiveness. Overjoyed at his return to the Church, he devotes himself to acts of ascetic repentance, though they soon devolve to mere acts of routine, as his thoughts turn elsewhere. His devotion comes to the attention of the Jesuits, and they encourage him to consider entering the priesthood. Stephen takes time to consider, but has a crisis of faith because of the conflict between his spiritual beliefs and his aesthetic ambitions. Along Dollymount Strand he spots a girl wading, and has an epiphany in which he is overcome with the desire to find a way to express her beauty in his writing.

As a student at University College, Dublin, Stephen grows increasingly wary of the institutions around him: Church, school, politics and family. In the midst of the disintegration of his family's fortunes his father berates him and his mother urges him to return to the Church. An increasingly dry, humourless Stephen explains his alienation from the Church and the aesthetic theory he has developed to his friends, who find that they cannot accept either of them. Stephen concludes that Ireland is too restrictive to allow him to express himself fully as an artist, so he decides that he will have to leave. He sets his mind on self-imposed exile, but not without declaring in his diary his ties to his homeland:

... I go to encounter for the millionth time the reality of experience and to forge in the smithy of my soul the uncreated conscience of my race.

== Style ==
The novel is a Bildungsroman and captures the essence of character growth and understanding of the world around him. The novel mixes third-person narrative with free indirect speech, which allows both identification with and distance from Stephen. The narrator refrains from judgement. The omniscient narrator of the earlier Stephen Hero informs the reader as Stephen sets out to write "some pages of sorry verse", while A Portrait gives only Stephen's attempts, leaving the evaluation to the reader.

The novel is written primarily as a third-person narrative with minimal dialogue until the final chapter. This chapter includes dialogue-intensive scenes alternately involving Stephen, Davin (Note: A friend of Stephen's from university. Davin is a countryman, with a simple but solid character. Stephen appreciates him for his athletic abilities, but does not share his blind faith in the Irish patriotic cause, into which his friend tries to convert him.) and Cranly. An example of such a scene is the one in which Stephen posits his complex Thomist aesthetic theory in an extended dialogue. According to Sanders, "... it is the eucharistic theology of Thomas Aquinas that most determines the complex aesthetics that Stephen expounds. Although his faith is replaced by scrupulous doubt, Stephen retains an insistent Jesuit authoritarianism in his arguments about definitions of beauty. As the latter stages of the story affirm, Stephen assumes a new priesthood, that of the artist". Joyce employs first-person narration for Stephen's diary entries in the concluding pages of the novel, perhaps to suggest that Stephen has finally found his own voice and no longer needs to absorb the stories of others. Joyce fully employs the free indirect style to demonstrate Stephen's intellectual development from his childhood, through his education, to his increasing independence and ultimate exile from Ireland as a young man. The style of the work progresses through each of its five chapters, as the complexity of language and Stephen's ability to comprehend the world around him both gradually increase. The book's opening pages communicate Stephen's first stirrings of consciousness when he is a child. Throughout the work language is used to describe indirectly the state of mind of the protagonist and the subjective effect of the events of his life.

The writing style is notable also for Joyce's omission of quotation marks: he indicates dialogue by beginning a paragraph with a dash, as is commonly used in French, Spanish or Russian publications.

The first two pages of A Portrait introduce many of the novel's key motifs, and have been shown to "enact the entire action in microcosm".

Joyce introduced the concept of "epiphany" in Stephen Hero to preface a discussion of Thomas Aquinas's three criteria of beauty, wholeness, harmony, and radiance: when the object "seems to us radiant, [it] achieves its epiphany". The term is not used when Stephen Dedalus explains his aesthetic theory in A Portrait. Joyce critics, however, have used it freely when discussing the novel as well as Ulysses and Finnegans Wake. One critic has identified four distinct epiphany techniques in Joyce's fiction, saying of A Portrait that "in at least three instances an epiphany helps Stephen decide on the future courses of this life".

Stephen Dedalus's aesthetic theory identifies three forms of literary art: lyric, epic, and dramatic. The Canadian scholar Hugh Kenner saw the three forms of literary art as a progression that applies to his novels, with A Portrait being lyric, Ulysses epic, and Finnegans Wake dramatic. William York Tindall has noted that other critics have applied the three forms differently, some finding all Joyce's works dramatic, one finding all three forms in A Portrait, another finding them in Ulysses "with more justification from the text perhaps". Tindall has speculated on how they might apply to A Portrait, Stephen being "lyric in his attitude toward himself", Joyce being dramatic in his attitude toward Stephen, so that at times "he is the author of a dramatic book about a lyric hero", while at other times he is an ironist and so "seems epic... standing between audience and victim".

== Themes ==
=== Identity ===
As a narrative which depicts a character throughout his formative years, M. Angeles Conde-Parrilla posits that identity is possibly the most prevalent theme in the novel. Towards the beginning of the novel, Joyce depicts the young Stephen's growing consciousness, which is said to be a condensed version of the arc of Dedalus' entire life, as he continues to grow and form his identity. Stephen's growth as an individual character is important because through him Joyce laments Irish society's tendency to force individuals to conform to types, which some say marks Stephen as a modernist character. Themes that run through Joyce's later novels find expression there.

=== Religion ===
As Stephen transitions into adulthood, he leaves behind his Catholic religious identity, which is closely tied to the national identity of Ireland. His rejection of this dual identity is also a rejection of constraint and an embrace of freedom in identity. Furthermore, the references to Dr Faustus throughout the novel conjure up something demonic in Stephen renouncing his Catholic faith. When Stephen stoutly refuses to serve his Easter duty later in the novel, his tone mirrors characters like Faust and Lucifer in its rebelliousness.

In Catholicism, "Eucharist" refers both to the act of Consecration, or transubstantiation, and its product, the body and blood of Christ under the appearances of bread and wine. It is the Church's central sacrament. Stephen uses it to dramatize his apostasy. He refuses to take communion during Easter time, every Catholic's duty, to show he is a Catholic no longer. He notes that the Eucharist is "a symbol behind which are massed twenty centuries of authority and veneration". Stephen parallels the literary artist with the Catholic priest and literary art with the Eucharist, both the act and the product. He sees himself as "The priest of eternal imagination transmuting the daily bread of experience into the radiant body of everliving life."

=== Myth of Daedalus ===
The myth of Daedalus and Icarus has parallels in the structure of the novel, and gives Stephen his surname, as well as the epigraph containing a quote from Ovid's Metamorphoses. According to Ivan Canadas, the epigraph may parallel the heights and depths that end and begin each chapter, and can be seen to proclaim the interpretive freedom of the text. Stephen's surname being connected to Daedalus may also call to mind the theme of going against the status quo, as Daedalus defies the King of Crete.

=== Irish identity ===
Stephen's struggle to find identity in the novel parallels the Irish struggle for independence during the early twentieth century. He rejects any outright nationalism, and is often prejudiced toward those that use Hiberno-English, which was the marked speech patterns of the Irish rural and lower-class. However, he is also heavily concerned with his country's future and understands himself as an Irishman, which then leads him to question how much of his identity is tied up in said nationalism.

=== The artist ===
Richard Ellmann wrote that Joyce "recognized his theme, the portrait of the renegade Catholic artist as hero". Critics have examined his debt to the Church theologian Thomas Aquinas for Stephen Dedalus's aesthetic theory. It's been argued that the theory also draws upon Catholicism's central doctrines in each of its two parts: the first concerned with the artist's intellect, the second with his imagination. Catholic theology distinguishes between God's activity in eternity, His begetting of the Son, the Word, and His activity in time: the Creation (soul and body), the Incarnation—the Word made flesh—and the Consecration in the Mass. Stephen uses Aquinas's application of the three criteria of beauty to the Son of God in eternity to model the artist's act of understanding—"epiphany" in Stephen Hero—and then uses the Creation to model the artist's act of (re)embodiment. In his reveries later, Stephen completes his aesthetic theory by also likening the artist to God at the Incarnation and, in the person of His priest, at the Consecration.

== Critical reception ==
A Portrait won Joyce a reputation for his literary skills, as well as a patron, Harriet Shaw Weaver, the business manager of The Egoist.

In 1916, in his reader's report to Duckworth & Co., Publishers, Edward Garnett wrote that, to make it publishable, A Portrait of the Artist as a Young Man needed to undergo extensive revision, especially at the beginning and the end. The public would call the book "as it stands at present, realistic, unprepossessing, unattractive". He said it was "ably written" and "arouse[d] interest and attention", and he approved of the rendering of the period and the characterizations. But he found the novel "too discursive, formless, unrestrained, and ugly things, ugly words, are too prominent". He concluded that the "author shows us he has art, strength and originality", but needed "to shape [his novel] more carefully as the product of the craftsmanship, mind and imagination of an artist".

In 1917 H. G. Wells wrote that "one believes in Stephen Dedalus as one believes in few characters in fiction", while warning readers of Joyce's "cloacal obsession", his insistence on the portrayal of bodily functions that Victorian morality had banished from print.

In 1917 Ezra Pound wrote, "James Joyce produces the nearest thing to Flaubertian prose that we now have in English", and predicted that A Portrait of the Artist as a Young Man would "remain a permanent part of English literature." He went on to further praise Joyce for writing in accord with Imagist standards: "Apart from Mr. Joyce's realism... apart from, or a piece with, all this is style, the actual writing: hard clear-cut, with no waste of words, no bungling up of useless phrases, no filling in with pages of slosh."

The following year Pound wrote, "[Joyce] has his scope beyond that of the novelists his contemporaries, in just so far as whole stretches of his keyboard are utterly outside of their compass." He continued, "[In] A Portrait of the Artist as a Young Man there is no omission; there is nothing in life so beautiful that Joyce cannot touch it without profanation—without, above all, the profanations of sentiment and sentimentality—and there is nothing so sordid that he cannot treat it with metallic exactitude."

In 1927 E. M. Forster wrote, "[Joyce] has shown (especially in the Portrait of the Artist) an imaginative grasp of evil. But he undermines the universe in too work-manlike a manner, looking round for this tool or that: in spite of all his internal looseness he is too tight, he is never vague except after due deliberation; it is talk, talk, never song."

In 1927 Wyndham Lewis criticized Joyce's diction in a sentence from chapter 2 of A Portrait:

Every morning, therefore, uncle Charles repaired to his outhouse but not before he had greased and brushed scrupulously his back hair and brushed and put on his tall hat.

Fifty years later, Hugh Kenner used Lewis's criticism to formulate what he called the Uncle Charles Principle. "Repaired" and "brushed scrupulously" are words Uncle Charles himself would use to describe what he was doing. Kenner argued, "This is apparently new in fiction, the normally neutral narrative vocabulary invaded by little clouds of idioms which a character might use if he were managing the narrative. In Joyce's various extensions of this device we have one clue to the manifold styles of Ulysses."

Kenner, writing in 1948, was critical of Stephen Dedalus, the protagonist of A Portrait, arguing that he "does not become an artist at all... but an aesthete" and "to take him seriously is very hard indeed". Kenner lamented, "[I]t is painful to be invited to close the book with an indigestibly Byronic hero stuck in our throats."

A later version of Kenner's 1948 essay appeared in his first book on Joyce published in 1955.

Writing in 1959, William York Tindall was also critical of Stephen Dedalus, saying "he never sees himself entirely". Tindall regretted Stephen's "failure to realize himself", adding that "this is attended to in Ulysses, which makes A Portrait seem preliminary sketch."

In 1963 S. L. Goldberg took issue with Kenner's negative appraisal of Stephen, conceding that "Mr. Kenner is certainly right in pointing to the irony with which Joyce views him in both the Portrait and Ulysses", but faulting him for concluding that in doing so Joyce is rejecting Stephen himself. For Goldberg, Joyce's "irony is a qualifying criticism, which does not imply a total rejection".

== Adaptations ==
A film version adapted for the screen by Judith Rascoe and directed by Joseph Strick was released in 1977. It features Bosco Hogan as Stephen Dedalus and T. P. McKenna as Simon Dedalus. John Gielgud plays Father Arnall, the priest whose lengthy sermon on Hell terrifies the teenage Stephen.

The first stage version was produced by Léonie Scott-Matthews at Pentameters Theatre in 2012 using an adaptation by Tom Neill.

Hugh Leonard's stage work Stephen D is an adaptation of A Portrait of the Artist as a Young Man and Stephen Hero. It was first produced at the Gate Theatre during the Dublin Theatre Festival of 1962.

As of 2017 computer scientists and literature scholars at University College Dublin, Ireland are in a collaboration to create the multimedia version of this work, by charting the social networks of characters in the novel. Animations in the multimedia editions express the relation of every character in the chapter to the others.

"A Phone of the Artist as a Young Man", by Pierce Day, was released in 2024.
