= Frank Winder =

Irish biochemistry professor, naturalist and climber (1928–2007)

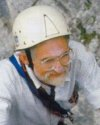
- Frank Winder
- Born: 14 April 1928; Ireland
- Died: 30 December 2007 (aged 79); Dublin, Ireland
- Education: Belvedere College; University College Dublin
- Occupations: Professor, naturalist
- Known for: Botany, rock climbing

Frank Gerard Augustine Winder (14 April 1928 – 30 December 2007, in Dublin) was an Irish biochemistry professor, naturalist, and one of Ireland's leading rock climbers in the 1950s and 1960s.

== Scientific career ==
Winder received his early education at Belvedere College, and developed an early interest in botany and zoology, cycling around the Irish countryside looking for interesting specimens. In 1945, he entered University College Dublin (UCD) to study science and came to the attention of Arthur Stelfox of the Natural History Museum. Stelfox introduced Winder to entomologist Philip Graves, who promptly sent the 18-year-old Winder off to the mountains of County Kerry in search of a rare butterfly, but Winder returned with a specimen of a dragonfly, Cordulia aenea, which was previously unknown in Ireland.

While climbing a steep gully on Knocknagantee in Kerry in search of a rare fern, Winder sustained a long fall but was luckily not seriously injured. It was that fall which made him realise that he would need to acquire rock-climbing skills if he was to explore cliffs in relative safety. (He later revisited the site of his fall, establishing a new rock-climb on the neighbouring buttress.)

Winder graduated from UCD with a BSc in biochemistry in 1948 and an MSc the following year. In 1950, after a brief period working for Glaxo, he joined a Medical Research Council research laboratory in Trinity College Dublin working on the chemotherapy of tuberculosis, under the leadership of Vincent Barry. The team developed a class of phenazines that proved very effective in the treatment of TB and leprosy, and remain in use worldwide. Winder also pioneered research into the primary anti-TB drug, isoniazid; his work on this continues to be cited internationally.

In Trinity, he became a lecturer in biochemistry in 1960, a fellow of the college in 1962, a reader in 1966, dean of Graduate Studies from 1974 to 1977 and a professor in 1975. He was conferred the degree of Doctor of Science in 1972. He served as director of the Biology Teaching Centre from 1986 to 1991 and was co-opted to Senior Fellowship in 1985. He served on the Board of College where he made contributions to the debates on policy and other business. He retired in 1996 but continued to come to college every day until shortly before his death.

In the 1950s, Winder was one of the founders of Tuairim, a group of young professionals who formed a think-tank to examine the problems affecting Ireland at the time, especially that of emigration. He was elected to membership in the Royal Irish Academy in 1961 and held the office of vice president three times.

== Climbing career ==
Frank Winder joined the Irish Mountaineering Club (IMC) shortly after its founding in 1948, and quickly became one of its leading members. He established many new rock-climbs in various parts of Ireland, especially in counties Wicklow, Donegal, and Galway. His most notable first ascents were made during the period 1950 to 1960, and include:

- Dalkey Quarry – Bracket Wall (HVS), Winder's Slab (VS), Winder's Crack (VD), Eliminate A Dash (S)
- Glendalough – Quartz Gully (grade HS), Prelude/Nightmare (VS), Fanfare (VS), Spillikin Ridge (now harder at E3, climbed by Winder with several points of aid), Lethe (VS), Forest Rhapsody (VS), Cúchulainn Groove (HS)
- Lough Barra (Derryveagh, Co. Donegal) – Diversion (S), Triversion (S), Surplomb Grise (VS), Fomorian (HS), Tarquin's Groove (HS)
- Lough Belshade (Bluestacks, Co. Donegal) – Byzantium (VS)
- Luggala – Spearhead (HVS)
- Poisoned Glen (Bluestacks, Co. Donegal) – Route Two (S), Ulysses (VS), Rafiki (VS)

Many of those climbs are now regarded as classics, and challenging even by today's much-higher standards.

Winder also climbed extensively abroad, visiting the Alps, Britain, and North America (Yosemite and Grand Tetons).

He was elected president of the IMC for two terms in the 1960s and 1980s. He also played a prominent role in mountain environmental organisations such as Wicklow Uplands Council and Keep Ireland Open.
