= William York Tindall =

American academic, Joycean scholar (1903–1981)

- Born: 1903; Williamstown, Vermont, U.S.
- Died: 1981 (aged 77–78); Salisbury, Maryland, U.S.

Academic background
- Education: Columbia College

William York Tindall (1903–1981) was an American Joycean scholar with a long and distinguished teaching career at Columbia University. Several of Tindall's classic works of criticism, including A Reader's Guide to James Joyce and A Reader's Guide to Finnegans Wake are still in print. He wrote a total of thirteen books on UK and Irish writers including Joyce, Dylan Thomas, W. B. Yeats, and Samuel Beckett. Indeed, Tindall nominated Beckett for the Nobel Prize in Literature; Beckett was the 1969 laureate.

Born in Vermont, he studied at Columbia, both as an undergraduate and graduate student. As an undergraduate, Tindall was a member of the Philolexian Society. Between those courses of study, in 1925 he set off to see Europe. He went to Paris and bought a copy of Joyce's Ulysses — then banned in America. By chance, he bought it on June 16, Bloomsday, the day in which all the events in the book take place. He had it rebound as a French novel to carry it through US Customs. That began Professor Tindall's study of and advocacy for Joyce's works in America; in fact, he started teaching Ulysses before the book was allowed in the US. Therefore, students in his first Ulysses course were forced to read the dean's copy kept secured in the university library. Finally in 1933, the United States District Court in New York City ruled that the novel was not obscene and could be published in America and in January 1934 Ulysses was available legally in the US.

Professor Tindall's teaching career at Columbia lasted from 1931 to 1971. For four decades, he taught some of the most popular literary criticism courses in the curriculum. He pioneered a method of reading Joyce's most difficult novel Finnegans Wake with a small group of graduate students, everyone adding a bit of their academic knowledge to the task. He called this Reading by Committee, saying that the group brought to it "a variety of languages and learning, [and] might do more with the book than I alone, with small learning and less Greek."
