= Parnell Monument =

Monument in Dublin, Ireland

- The monument in 2006
- Artists: Augustus Saint-Gaudens; Henry Bacon
- Year: 1 October 1911 (115 years ago)
- Type: Shantalla granite, Barna granite, cast bronze, applied bronze decoration and panels
- Dimensions: 19 m (62 ft)
- Location: Dublin, Ireland; 53°21′09″N 6°15′41″W

The Parnell Monument is a 19-metre-tall (62 ft) monument to Irish nationalist politician Charles Stewart Parnell (1846–1891), located at the northern end of O'Connell Street in Dublin, Ireland.

Designed by Irish-American sculptor Augustus Saint-Gaudens (statue) and American architect Henry Bacon (obelisk), the monument took more than a decade to complete, and was the last public monument Saint-Gaudens saw to completion before his death. It consists of a bronze statue of Parnell set against a large granite obelisk, whose south-facing side bears a gilt inscription of one of his quotations as well as a harp. It was unveiled on 1 October 1911, twenty years after Parnell's death.

According to the O'Connell Street Monument Report, the monument "now stands in answer to the O'Connell Statue at the south end and terminates the parade of nationalist statues on the primary thoroughfare of the capital." The monument is within the O'Connell Street Architectural Conservation Area.

== History ==
=== 1895 Great Sugar Loaf memorial ===
Following Parnell's death in 1891, a campaign was initiated to establish a permanent monument commemorating his political career and his contribution to the Irish nationalist cause. However, prior to the drive to create a Dublin memorial to Parnell, there were plans for a separate monument to be erected on the summit of the Great Sugar Loaf in County Wicklow. On 10 November 1895, a "large, representative, and enthusiastic public meeting" was held in Kilmacanogue, County Wicklow for the purposes of "forwarding a movement" towards getting the monument started. The meeting was organised by the Independent Nationalists of Bray, Kilmacanogue, Enniskerry and surrounding neighbourhoods.

=== Gladstone memorial ===
In 1898, shortly before a movement to commemorate Parnell by memorial in Dublin took hold, "another controversy developed" in connection with a proposal to erect a statue of William Gladstone in Dublin, the former-Prime Minister who had recently died. The Trustees of the Gladstone National Memorial Fund, set up in 1898, proposed three monuments, one each for London, Edinburgh and Dublin, but the suggestion was "met with outrage by many in Dublin and newspaper articles drew attention to the inappropriate nature of such a commemoration, particularly when, as yet, there was no statue of Parnell", who was already seven years dead. Dublin Corporation passed a motion that same year stating 'that no statue should be erected in Dublin in honour of any Englishman until at least the Irish people have raised a fitting monument to the memory of Charles Stewart Parnell.'

=== Dublin memorial ===
The plan for a Parnell Monument in Dublin was initiated by John Redmond MP, who had succeeded Parnell as leader of the Irish Parliamentary Party, intended both as a symbolic tribute to the 'uncrowned king of Ireland' and as part of his broader effort to reunite the constitutional nationalist movement under his leadership.

John Redmond, who initiated the Parnell Monument

In 1898, the Parnell Committee was founded, being a voluntary body with the aim of funding the monument. The committee was chaired by Lord Mayor of Dublin Daniel Tallon, whilst other members included John Redmond, MP, Count Plunkett, Dr. J. E. Kenny, Thomas Baker (manager of the Irish Independent) and the Hon. Edward Blake, MP. The address of the committee was listed as 39 Upper Sackville Street where the offices of the United Irish League were also recorded, who had also been set up in 1898.

By July 1899, the Roscommon Messenger publicly endorsed the Dublin city location for the monument on behalf of the people of Roscommon, stating:

(We) now welcome this monument to raise up in the centre of the Metropolis a perpetual token of the esteem and admiration in which Irishmen hold the immortal leader whose memory shall be cherished deep in the hearts of many generations of his countrymen [..] A generous response is certain to be made from all over the country, and by Irish exiles in every land, to the appeal which will be soon made for the necessary funds to raise up a monument equal to the greatest of those which now adorn the streets of our Capital...

A public meeting was held at the Mansion House in Dublin on 27 July 1899, presided over by Lord Mayor Tallon to consider the "desirability of inaugurating a movement for the erection of a monument in the city commemorative of the great public services" of Parnell. It was first proposed to place the monument on the site of the Thomas Moore statue on College Street, which had been erected in 1857, and which the Committee offered to remove elsewhere at their own expense. Dublin City Council refused to grant the site, however, and instead directed that the monument be more suitably erected on a site nearer to the Rotunda Hospital at the northern end of Sackville Street. In 1881, a Dublin City Improvement Bill had previously proposed moving Nelson's Pillar to the same vacant site, but failed.

==== Foundation stone ====
On Sunday 8 October 1899, two days after the eighth anniversary of Parnell's death (observed annually as "Ivy Day"), the "climax of the manifestations in honour of Parnell was reached when the central ceremonial of the procession was the laying of the foundation-stone to a monument to the Irish leader, at the head of Dublin's noblest thoroughfare–O'Connell Street." Tickets were issued to VIPs, which read: "Parnell Memorial Demonstration – Admit Bearer to Platform on the occasion of Laying Foundation Stone of Parnell Memorial."

On 9 October 1899, The Irish Times reported that there had been "scenes" at the platform erected for the ceremony, and protests "caused by those who apparently objected to the initiation of the project (a monument to Parnell) before the completion of a memorial to Wolfe Tone" who had died over a century earlier in 1798. The foundation stone of an abortive memorial to Tone had been laid at the Grafton Street corner of St Stephen's Green over a year prior on 15 August 1898 as part of commemorations for the centenary of the 1798 Rebellion.

The ceremony, and its "attendant friction between Parnellites and anti-Parnellites" was described in the newspapers the following day. According to Archive Consultants, in their O'Connell Street Monument Report, the laying of the foundation stone was also not attended as well as it might otherwise have been, owing to the Katharine O'Shea scandal, a woman with whom Parnell had had an extramarital affair:

Owing to the split in the party over the O'Shea case, the ceremony for the laying of the foundation stone on 8 October 1899, was marred by a conspicuous absence of most of the Irish Parliamentary Party (I.P.P.), city and county magistrates, as well as Roman Catholic bishops and clergy, proceedings were also marred by heckling from extreme nationalists against Redmond's weak plea for unity. Financial support was going to be hard come by in Ireland and Redmond was forced to tour America with a representative of the Parnell monument committee to raise funds.

Although the foundation stone was laid, the sculptor for the intended Parnell statue had yet to be decided or commissioned.

=== USA fundraising tour ===
On 11 October 1899, the Lord Mayor of Dublin, his secretary Mr Thomas Kennedy, the Hon Burke Roche MP, and John Redmond MP, left Dublin for the United States of America via steamship from Queenstown, County Cork for the purposes of fundraising. The intended aim was to raise enough money to be able to purchase Avondale House (the late residence of Parnell, including its 200 acres of demesne and grounds), and with the remaining funds to continue construction on a fitting monument to Parnell. The Lord Mayor was obliged, under an old statute of the Irish Parliament, to not remain absent from Dublin for more than two months at a time without forfeiture of office, and so the trip was limited to that time period.

During the course of the tour, the group visited the cities of Portland, Lewiston, Boston, Newton, Quincy, Worcester, Providence, New Haven, New York, Orange, Philadelphia, Washington, D.C., Albany, Buffalo and Detroit. The Lord Mayor later reported that "At all our meetings we were favoured with the attendance of most prominent citizens and prominent Irishmen, and at our great meeting in Philadelphia we had Governor Stone presiding, while in every city we went to, the Mayor was present or presided."

Locations in the northeastern United States visited by the Dublin delegation during the Oct-Dec 1899 fundraising trip

During the course of the tour, the delegation were received in special audience by President McKinley at the White House, and in the "course of an interesting conversation, the President discussed Irish affairs with a degree of interest and knowledge of facts which we could not have expected from (him) considering his many arduous duties" as explained by Tallon. The group were also entertained by then-Governor Roosevelt at the State Mansion in Albany, New York where "it quite surprised us to notice the scholarly knowledge he had of everything Irish and our history generally." Roosevelt had arranged for many prominent persons to meet them there, including the Catholic Bishop of the Diocese, Irish-born Thomas Martin Aloysius Burke.

The Mechanics Hall in Worcester, Massachusetts in the late 1800s

By late November 1899, the group were in Worcester, Massachusetts, where an "enthusiastic meeting" was held in their honour in the city's Mechanics Hall in aid of the Parnell Memorial Fund. For the occasion, the town had been "brilliantly illuminated", and parades of Cuban veterans (from the recent Spanish–American War), the Emmet Guards and the Hibernian Guards were observed. The event was presided over by Senator Hoar who praised the late Parnell's "coolness, wisdom, capacity and restraint". At the conclusion of the meeting "a large sum was collected", according to the Evening Herald, receiving news updates via cablegram from Boston.

At New York, the Municipal Council conferred on the Lord Mayor of Dublin the freedom of the city, as also happened in Boston. In general, the Irish contingent were "most hospitably entertained" at a variety of social parties across the cities they visited, one of which was hosted in Orange, New Jersey by a Mr Thomas Nevins, formerly of Gorey, who had by then become one of the "leading citizens" of that city. Of the fundraising mission in Orange, The Munster Express wrote:

But there is a further purpose in the visit of these distinguished Irishmen to this city and country. It is to revive the waning faith of the friends of Ireland in the Irish cause and to offer them the assurance that through the rift of gloomy clouds that has darkened the Irish political sky for some years past, the bright and scintillating star of hope is beginning to shine that will, at no distant period, guide them to the haven of national independence amid the hills and dales of their native land. The spirit of the illustrious leader (Parnell) should animate their efforts in this direction and inspire them with the same lofty courage and devotion to principle, that inspired and animated him in life.

The newspaper continued: "the gratifying success which has attended the mission will make it possible not only to purchase Avondale, but also to commence the work of the Parnell Monument in O'Connell street, Dublin, at an early date." Redmond was reported as having already put himself in communication with some of the leading American sculptors of the age with the object of securing designs and plans.

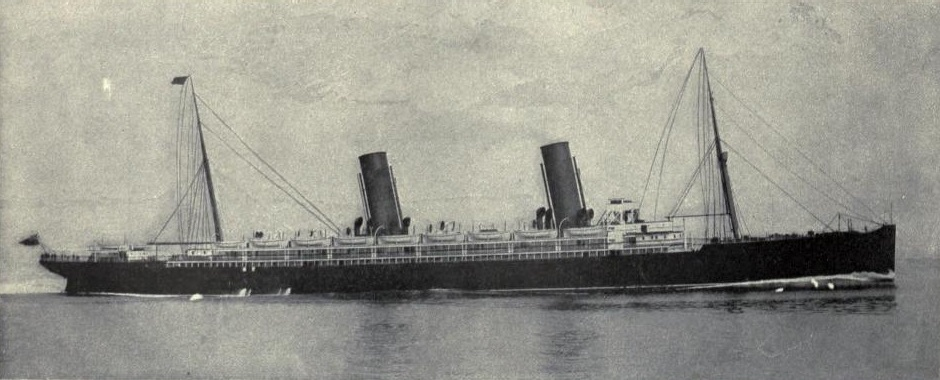
The RMS Campania, on which the group returned to Ireland from New York city

The party returned to Ireland aboard the Cunard steamer RMS Campania from New York, arriving at Queenstown, County Cork on the afternoon of Friday 8 December 1899, where they were met by Pat O'Brien MP, "to whom they extended a cordial greeting." The Evening Herald reported from the dockside:

The Lord Mayor, during an interview coming on shore, said they were given a hearty reception by prominent persons everywhere they visited–New York, Boston, Portland, Albany, Buffalo, Detroit, Worcester, New Haven, etc.–and collected the handsome sum of £6,000, which will go to save the Parnell estate in the County Wicklow and to build a Parnell Monument; and other sums are to follow in Ireland [..] A concert was held on the Campania on Wednesday evening, when the Lord Mayor presided, and the sum of £45 was realized.

The party left "at once" for Dublin by special mail train at 4pm. Of the total of £6,000 riased, the Lord Mayor revealed that half of it, or £3,000, was "subscribed by Tammany Hall, which of course means New York City in a sense." Redmond and the Lord Mayor "would have" been able to collect "considerably more money", according to the Derry Journal, but for the circumstance that the Lord Mayor was reaching his two-month absence from Dublin and needed to return. The Lord Mayor himself noted that "we had many other meetings arranged, but, as I said, we were obliged to cancel them." Richard Croker, an Irish-American leader of New York's Tammany Hall, later travelled with John Redmond to the unveiling of the Parnell Monument in Dublin in 1911.

The Cork Examiner commended the sum of money collected in America, noting that "without doubt this collection affords yet another proof of the support which the Irish people might expect from the Irish abroad [..] One wants to go to America to realise how our scattered fellow-countrymen dwell upon and cherish every association which binds them to their native land. Their generosity, their enthusiasm and the sincerity with which they helped us deserve more than a passing word of praise." Explaining to the press how the money would soon be spent, the Lord Mayor reiterated the intent to purchase Avondale, continuing "Furthermore, it is our intention to place the Parnell monument in the hands of an eminent sculptor at once, and start the work on it forthwith. We are now in a position to pay an instalment for that purpose."

Augustus Saint-Gaudens

Augustus Saint-Gaudens, was, by 1900, one of "the most eminent sculptors in America", according to Rothery, and this fact, "coupled with his Irish birth, was probably a key factor in his choice as sculptor for the proposed memorial to Parnell." John Redmond was also quoted as saying that "no Irish sculptor of sufficient ability (was) living." Rothery notes that an undated memorandum among the Redmond papers in the National Library of Ireland dealing with the Parnell Monument Committee, stated that "Irish people in America paid most of the cost" which may have been another factor in the choice of Augustus Saint-Gaudens as sculptor.

=== Progress in Ireland ===
In early January 1900, a meeting of the Parnell Monument Committee was held in the Mansion House, Dublin. Of the £6,000 raised in America, it was decided that £3,000 would be "devoted to the purchase of Avondale, and with the remainder there would be commenced the erection of a monument equal to the O'Connell memorial." The committee computed that the work would take five years, and would cost between £8,000 and £10,000.

The O'Connell Monument on Sackville Street, Dublin c.1895

In June 1900, a man named V B Dillon purchased an original life-size bronze bust of Parnell for the Parnell Monument Committee at an auction of the late physician J. E. Kenny's effects, for £62.

On 6 October 1900, the ninth anniversary of Parnell's death, the annual Ivy Day procession passed by the year-old foundation stone of the Parnell Monument on its journey to Glasnevin Cemetery. The Irish Daily Independent noted "an enormous mustering of sightseers" who had taken up their stand at the stone.

=== Saint-Gaudens accepts commission ===
Saint-Gaudens, then the "most eminent in the art of public monuments in the United States", informally accepted the Parnell commission in 1900, the same year as he was diagnosed with cancer. In a letter to Thomas Baker (member of the Parnell Monument Committee, and manager of the Irish Independent) dated Paris, 29 January 1900, Saint-Gaudens stated that he "would make models only after the commission was confirmed," but that there was an additional interest for him in taking on the project considering he had been born in Dublin. Despite this, a formal agreement between himself and the Parnell Monument Committee would not be signed until 1903.

Saint-Gaudens had been born on Charlemont Street, Dublin in 1848, the son of a French shoemaker, Bernard Paul Ernest Saint-Gaudens, and his Irish wife, Mary McGuinness, from County Longford, however when he was only six months old, his family emigrated to the United States and settled in New York. Although having been born in Ireland (within two miles of the future location of the Parnell Monument), Saint-Gaudens was not generally recognised as Irish.

On 28 August 1901, the Limerick Leader reprinted a message of thanks from John Redmond and Daniel Tallon (then ex-Lord Mayor of Dublin) to PJ Flatley, president of the Parnell Monument Association of Boston, thanking him for additional funds sent, and updating him on the status of the work:

It may be of interest to you to know exactly how matters now stand with reference to the Parnell Monument. As already explained to you, owing to the action of the judge of the Land Court in Dublin last November, in insisting on selling the entire Parnell estate in all one lot for a sum of £8,000, we were unable to purchase Avondale. The matter, however, is not finally concluded [..] In addition to this we have concluded the preliminary steps with Mr Augustus St Gaudens, the eminent Irish American sculptor, to undertake the monument at a cost of 40,000 dollars to be completed in five years.

Rothery states that "an early, and somewhat crude, pencil sketch by Saint-Gaudens for the project shows a rather stumpy little monument while another sketch, almost a joke, shows a large harp sitting on top of a shaft with a figure at the base." Of the monument, Saint-Gaudens stated his intention that "The work is to endure for generations, when idiosyncrasies will have been forgotten and the monument will count as a whole regardless of any personal peculiarities." Burke Wilkinson, author of a biography on Saint-Gaudens, claims that he "greatly admired" Parnell and that he took "extraordinary pains with the monument. Indeed, his planning involved building a seventy-foot model of the obelisk, which was found to dwarf the figure and had to be reduced."

=== Delays before contract formalised ===
By 1903, progress with the work was dragging and dissatisfaction within the Parnell Monument Committee was mounting, so much so that John Redmond wrote to Thomas Baker on 19 February that year in a letter marked "private" in which he urged that the agreement with Saint-Gaudens be confirmed quickly to prevent a full meeting of the committee "deciding to give up St. Gaudens for local talent", but acknowledged that the dismissal of Saint-Gaudens would cause "a further delay of all sorts and kinds." Baker responded in a letter dated 14 March, expressing his dissatisfaction with Saint-Gaudens' "inability or unwillingness to inspect the site" and the "very crude sketch of his design."

Saint-Gaudens working in his studio c.1888

Saint-Gaudens was growing increasingly sick during the period covered by the Dublin commission, and never visited the site in person, completing all his work from the United States. Rothery states that Saint-Gaudens "appeared to have implied at the start that until a contract with, presumably, dates for interim payments was agreed, a sculptor could not be expected to expend much effort or expense", further delaying the project. Saint-Gaudens was also engaged with numerous commissions in the United States, many of which were being worked on simultaneously at his studio in Cornish, New Hampshire, and the relatively small scale of the Parnell commission may have meant that it received less immediate attention than some of his larger projects.

Thomas Baker travelled to the United States to visit and negotiate with Saint-Gaudens, and reported in a letter or memorandum dated 3 June 1903 from aboard the S.S. Celtic, how he had visited the man in his studio and seen "numerous drawings and models of the Parnell Monument." His final meeting with the sculptor was at the Sherman Monument in Central Park, in May 1903, one of "the most important works of his career", according to Rothery, and on which he had been working since 1892. As this statue was unveiled in May 1903, Baker may have been present at the unveiling.

=== Contract and design ===
Formal agreement for the Parnell commission was achieved as part of Baker's visit, "between the Parnell Monument Committee of Dublin, Ireland and Augustus Saint-Gaudens of New York City", and stipulated that the monument was to be executed in "granite, Istrian stone or regular Italian monumental marble or in green Greek marble, Connemara marble or American Ascutney green sienite" sourced from a mountain near Saint-Gaudens' studio. The contract stated:

"The work is to be composed of a bronze statue of Mr. Parnell not less than eight feet in height in connection with a monument from 30 to 40 feet in height, and similar in general character to the design which accompanies and forms part of this agreement."

Saint-Gaudens had initially proposed an obelisk utilising green Irish marble to Baker, but when he was shown photographs of the 203ft-high Wellington Monument in Dublin and its obelisk shape, Saint-Gaudens replied that he would have to "reconsider the whole scheme."

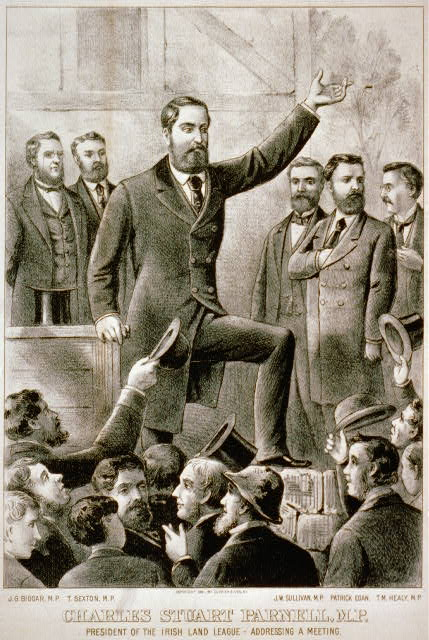
Print showing Charles Stewart Parnell addressing a meeting c.1881

According to the O'Connell Street Monument Report, Saint-Gaudens planned a monument which would integrate sculpture and architecture, and the "original concept of a bronze figure of about 8 feet high placed by a bronze table was to be set against a 30 foot pyramid." As this form was found to be already used in the Wellington Monument obelisk, Saint-Gaudens and the architect Henry Bacon of New York "proposed a triangular shaft almost double the height of the original."

Saint-Gaudens constructed a detailed impression of Parnell from photographs, caricatures, and accounts of his appearance, dress, mannerisms, and demeanour, and wrote to Redmond that he intended the entire monument to be "as simple, impressive and austere as possible, in keeping with the character of the Irish cause as well as of Parnell." A firm of Dublin tailors were also requested to send to Saint-Gaudens replicas of the clothes they had last made for Parnell.

Saint-Gaudens work ultimately portrayed Parnell in what he regarded as a noble and composed manner. He depicted him wearing an open frock coat (see: Victorian men's fashion), with one hand resting on a table and the other extended in a dramatic gesture, as if "making a point at a parliamentary debate." Another reviewer described it: "with one arm extended mid-gesture, as though still mid-speech in the House of Commons." In contrast, the base of the monument features swags and bucrania, noted as "an incongruous decorative scheme in relation to the neo-classical character" of the nearby Rotunda, resulting in "an odd proximity of ox-skulls to Parnell's feet." irishhistory.com notes that "the bucrania at Parnell's feet are easy to miss, but worth finding."

The Parnell commission was to prove a protracted project, with the demand for Saint-Gaudens' work in America so great at the time that work on the project was repeatedly postponed. At around the same time, he was working on the equestrian statue of General Sherman.

=== Work on monument ===
==== Scale replica in New Hampshire ====
A letter exists from Saint-Gaudens to Redmond, dated 4 December (no year given) in which the sculptor asks for photographs of the buildings on each side of the square where the monument was to be erected, and a city lay-out plan of Dublin. To aid in his work, Saint-Gaudens constructed a scale replica in New Hampshire of the buildings and square that existed around the monument in Dublin, and also a full scale model of the intended monument (including a timber model of the structure 70 feet high) with a plaster cast of the statue in front of it. This replica, which he constructed in a field next to his studio circa 1905, helped in visualising the scale of the finished piece in context.

==== Bronze work ====
In 1904, there was a fire in the studio and only the head of the Parnell statue was saved. According to the National Park Service, Saint-Gauden's assistant Elsie Ward "dragged a ladder to the side of the completely clay model and wrestled the head off. This quick action saved the most important part of the piece from the flames in an otherwise major setback." After the fire, Saint-Gaudens was quoted as saying "More than all the rest of my losses in the fire I regret, as an Irishman, the loss of the Parnell statue."

According to Rothery, the sculptor Henry Hering was "chiefly responsible for modelling the statue after the fire" and the bronze was subsequently cast at the Roman Bronze Company of New York City, six weeks before Saint-Gaudens death. The finished sculpture, including the statue and bronzes, arrived in Dublin in 1907 and the architect Henry Bacon took over responsibility for carrying out the architectural drawings of the monument, and to complete the obelisk.

The names of the thirty-two counties of Ireland (including those situated in what would become Northern Ireland after Partition) and four provinces on bronze plaques around the base were "part of an earlier scheme for the four-sided pyramid, representing the four provinces and were retained for the revised triangular shaft."

==== Obelisk ====
The obelisk forms the dominant vertical element of the composition, and was conceived by architect Henry Bacon, one of the principal assistants of the architectural firm McKim, Mead and White. Bacon would later achieve renown for the design of the monumental Lincoln Memorial in Washington from 1912-17. Rothery contends that it is likely that Saint-Gaudens and Bacon collaborated on all aspects of the design of the Parnell project, an architectural monument such as it is, and it is "likely that the form and materials for the shaft and base would have been agreed" between the two. Rothery states that the "scale and elegance of the final result would seem to indicate a successful collaboration of architect and sculptor."

The supervising architect for the monument was Irishman George Sheridan, who is believed to have supervised local construction matters. The shaft of the monument is constructed in undecorated ashlar granite. An article in The Irish Architect and Craftsman described the masonry as Shantalla granite from Galway city with an "inlaid trefoil of Barna granite (also from County Galway) embracing the base and pedestal". An audit of County Geological Sites in Galway city by the Geological Survey of Ireland described where in the monument the different shades of Shantalla granite were used: "Pink-coloured, fined grained stone was used for the top of the monument, whilst dark-grey, medium-grained stone was used for the base."

==== Base ====
Wyse Jackson, curator of the Geological Museum at Trinity College Dublin, writes of the base: "Around the monument, the bollards and the slabs between the cobbles are of Barna granite. This stone is quite dark in colour, and contains large pink feldspars (called phenocrysts) which are set into a fine-grained, greenish-black matrix of quartz, feldspar and mica."

=== Oireachtas Art Exhibition 1907 ===
The completed statue (without obelisk) was exhibited at the Oireachtas Art Exhibition of the Gaelic League in August 1907 in Dublin, with "a perspective view of the obelisk showing the statue in position", by supervising architect for the monument, George Sheridan, also shown. The Irish Times reported:

This year's collection is one of very special merit, apart altogether from the fact that it includes the Parnell Statue by Augustus St. Gaudens. The statue, of course, is the central feature, and occupies a prominent position at the top of the principal room: it is instantly seen on entering the Academy."

Saint-Gaudens died at his home in Cornish, New Hampshire on 3 August 1907 from intestinal cancer aged 59.

=== Unveiling ===
On Sunday, 1 October 1911, the monument was unveiled by John Redmond to large crowds numbering some 50,000 people, many of whom had been absent from the foundation stone ceremony in 1899. The Catholic Northwest Progress in Seattle reported:

The Dublin procession was three miles long. It marched over a route four miles long. When the mass of people had assembled about the monument they made a throng bigger than any seen in Ireland since Parnell's funeral. John Redmond rode in an open carriage, accompanied by Richard Croker. They received the heartiest reception along the line of march. Mr. Redmond addressed an audience of fully 50,000 persons. He said that they had assembled in performance of a great national duty that should have been performed twenty years ago. The hour was most fitted for the Irish race to assemble to do homage to the memory of Parnell [..] Mr. Redmond concluded with a glowing tribute to Parnell's work and his character. He said that the proudest moment of his own life was in giving to the citizens of Dublin a noble monument; the work of the greatest American sculptor of his day, himself the son of an Irish mother, to the memory of the greatest son of Ireland since the day of Hugh O'Neill.

Forty special trains were arranged to ferry passengers from the north and west of Ireland, but owing to the unsettled strike in the south, the southern Nationalists were unable to travel to Dublin in great numbers. The Cork, Limerick, Waterford, Wexford and Kilkenny corporations, however, sent civic officers and a "strong representation" of delegates. Sixteen special trains transported 20,000 people from Belfast alone, and some of the people of Cork, who were "so anxious" to be present at the ceremony attempted to charter a special steamer when the news of the rail strike became known, but were too late. There were also strikes and marches associated with the unveiling "indicating the unrest to follow", according to the O'Connell Street Monument Report.

The Irish Independent wrote of the day:

Despite the untoward circumstances which made it impossible for contingents to come from the South and West, the procession assumed huge proportions. It was fully three miles in length, and it took one hour and forty minutes to pass a given point. Nothing to compare with it has been witnessed in Dublin since 1898 (see: Centenary of 1798 Rebellion). The trades mustered in fine force, whilst among individual counties, Wicklow, Parnell's native place, supplied the biggest contingent.

The Irish Architect and Craftsman magazine published a detailed article on the Parnell Monument after it was unveiled, noting that: "The Monument has proved the complete artistic success which we anticipated. All those present were struck by its beauty and chaste outline." A rival journal, the Irish Builder and Engineer, wrote "It was more peculiar than appealing - though original it undoubtedly is." Sealy, Bryers & Walker printers of Dublin produced a souvenir pamphlet for the event, entitled 'Souvenir of the Unveiling of the Parnell National Monument', which was priced at 6 pence. Souvenir postcards were also produced, by one P. Quinn of Belfast.

The day following the unveiling, the Corporation passed a motion to rename the street on which the monument stands at a junction, from Great Britain Street to Parnell Street. The Parnell Monument proved to be "one of the last sculptural initiatives" undertaken in Dublin city before Irish independence in the 1920s, and was one of only two commemorative figurative monuments to be erected in O'Connell Street in the twentieth century, the other being that of Jim Larkin in 1979.

On 30 November 1911, The New Zealand Tablet reported on the unveiling, hoping that the monument would "serve in the best possible manner to keep Parnell's name enshrined in the hearts of posterity even when Ireland, after many years in the enjoyment of freedom and prosperity, has half forgotten the long period of sorrow and suffering through which she has passed."

== Design ==
The National Inventory of Architectural Heritage describes the design elements of the monument thus:

Polished Shantalla granite ashlar block construction to tapering obelisk set on raised pedestal with applied bronze decoration and panels naming counties of Ireland and abutted to south by projecting granite pedestal with bronze decoration and lettering naming provinces. Above pedestal is continuous carved festoon with bucrania to corners. South projecting pedestal supports figurative bronze statue of Charles Stewart Parnell (1846-91) with outstretched arm. South face of obelisk has gilt inscription [..] Obelisk surmounted by decorative cusped capital supporting bronze tripod and eternal bronze flame. Monument stands on round traffic island with interlocking granite kerbing and cobbles protected by squat domed granite bollards.

=== Dimensions ===
The New Zealand Tablet of 1911 provided measurements for the design elements:

The monument [..] is an obelisk triangular on plan, rising to a height of 57 feet above the street level, and crowned with a bronze tripod eight feet high. The base or pedestal rests on a platform 26 feet in diameter standing some nine inches over the street paving, and in which is inlaid a large trefoil of Barna granite embracing the area of the base. The bronze statue of Parnell, eight feet high, stands on a projecting pedestal at a height of about nine feet over the street, and around the pedestal and the base of the monument are carved ox skulls and swags...

== Inscription ==
According to the O'Connell Street Monument Report, Redmond chose a passage from one of the more extreme Parnell speeches for the inscription on the obelisk. Oliver Rafferty, writing in Studies: An Irish Quarterly Review quoted it as Parnell's "notorious 'March of the Nation' speech" of 21 January 1885, in which he set out his ne plus ultra thinking. The inscription reads:

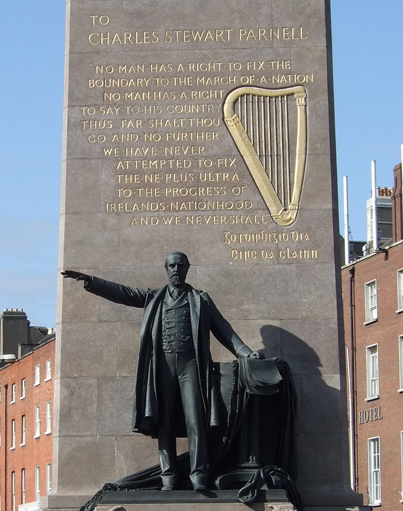
Statue and text on obelisk

To
Charles Stewart Parnell

No man has a right to fix the
boundary to the march of a nation.
No man has a right
to say to his country
thus far shalt thou
go and no further.
We have never
attempted to fix
the ne plus ultra
to the progress of
Ireland's nationhood
and we never shall.

(Irish, in Gaelic type):
Go soirḃiġiḋ (soirbhighidh) Dia
Éire dá clainn

(English translation):
May God make Ireland flourish for her people)

== Appraisal ==
Art critic Robert Elliott criticised the Parnell Monument on aesthetic grounds, while politician Arthur Griffith disliked it as a symbol of Redmondism. A 1911 article in The Irish Architect and Craftsman wrote:

The statue of Parnell, standing on a pedestal at the base of the triangular shaft, completes a great work on which St. Gaudens laboured with keen zest and an enthusiasm begotten of his Celtic origin. In honouring his mother's nationality he left Ireland a work of art instilled with that feeling of strength and refinement which labels the work as being that of a great artist, and which shall remain for all time a remarkable tribute to the genius of St. Gaudens."

The poet W. B. Yeats considered it 'a finer monument than the Pillar (Nelson's Pillar), without being very interesting'. Yeats's 1927 poem "The Three Monuments" has Parnell, Nelson and O'Connell on their respective monuments, mocking Ireland's post-independence leaders for their rigid morality and lack of courage, the obverse of the qualities of the "three old rascals". Yeats drew on the analogy again during his contribution to the Senate debate on divorce in 1925, suggesting that "their public presence was 'encouraging', given their adulterous behaviour, and that these 'three very salutary objects of meditation (might) make us a little more tolerant'."

As noted by the Dictionary of Irish Architects, the monument received "begrudging notice" in the editorial columns of the Irish Builder for 29 July 1922, who wrote:

The Parnell monument, as placed, is a noticeable obstruction to traffic... The statue... is certainly a fine work of art, though it makes Parnell excessively niggled and eccentric looking. The late lamented T. Fitzpatrick, the Irish cartoonist, aptly criticised it, when he made the shade of Parnell to soliloquise, "well, I never pretended to be the best dressed man in the House of Commons; but Great Scott! I never wore trousers like these!"

Author, architect and lecturer at DIT Bolton Street, Sean Rothery, categorised the Parnell Monument as the one "direct link between Ireland and the American Beaux Arts tradition."

The Parnell and O'Connell Monument side-by-side for comparison

According to the 2003 O'Connell Street Monument Report, there is a "stark contrast" between the presentation of Parnell and O'Connell in their respective statues on O'Connell Street, "the former does not symbolically rise above political structures, but tries to find a new form of expression, accessible to the people in the location of the figure." As per irishhistory.com, the figure of Parnell is "notably lower and more approachable than the elevated O'Connell, a difference in scale that reflects a conscious choice about how each man was to be presented to the public."

== Later history ==
In June 1913, John Redmond, in his capacity as Secretary of the Parnell Monument Committee, wrote to Dublin City Council requesting them to take the Monument into their charge from thence on, "on behalf of the Citizens of Dublin." The Council agreed, and since then the monument has been in the care of the Corporation of Dublin.

The Parnell Monument survived the political violence and destruction that affected O'Connell Street during the Easter Rising of 1916 and subsequent conflicts. The surrounding street suffered considerable damage during the fighting, while the monument remained substantially intact.

In 1935, Irish artist Art O'Murnaghan wrote in the Irish Naturalists' Journal of witnessing "quite near to the Parnell Monument, in the space between the last tree and a tramway standard" a group of six or seven wagtails, splashing in puddles, who came from a roost in a tree nearby. The sight was quite unusual as the birds were to be more commonly seen "among the sedges and reeds of lonely water-courses" than in the main street of a capital city. Irish naturalist Robert Lloyd Praeger also noted the unusual presence of the birds in his 1937 memoir The Way That I Went.

In 1973, as part of the Central Dublin Traffic Plan commissioned by Dublin Corporation and prepared by R. Travers Morgan & Partners, it was envisaged that the Parnell Monument would need to be moved further down O'Connell Street to make space for a Northern Tangent road.

In the late 1990s, while Dublin Corporation was searching for a monument to replace the position left vacant by Nelson's Pillar in front of the General Post Office (GPO), art historian Homan Potterton opined that the Parnell Monument might make a worthy candidate, for reasons he outlined in the Irish Arts Review Yearbook 1999:

The plan proposes – among other things – that the former Nelson Pillar which had the dual function of foreshortening the length of the street and giving it a focal point should, as an element, be reinstated and that the spatial quality of the area at the junction of O'Connell Street and Parnell Street, with the Parnell Monument as its pivot, needs to be emphasised and reinforced. Both of these objectives can be achieved by a single stroke: move the handsome obelisk [..] to outside the GPO and establish some (sculptural or architectural) feature in its place which would, on the one hand, complement in scale the O'Connell Monument at the opposite end of the street and at the same time define the Parnell Street/O'Connell Street junction more clearly while linking Parnell Square more satisfactorily to O'Connell Street. Any new feature at the centre of O'Connell Street needs to be tall but it can never be tall enough while the Parnell Monument is at the other end. That is why it should be moved. Let Parnell himself face and gesture towards the GPO and, if that is not symbolic enough, let the new symbol for Dublin really be a symbol and properly link the neglected north inner-city to the glamour of the capital's newly-enhanced central mall.

== Legacy ==
On 25 October 2007, "over a hundred people gathered at the foot" of the Parnell Monument when American Ambassador to Ireland Thomas Foley presented a bronze plaque marking the centennial of Saint-Gaudens' death to Lord Mayor of Dublin Paddy Bourke. The commemorative relief was made by American artist Lawrence J. Nowlan (1965-2013) who had previously served as the sculptor-in-residence at the Saint-Gaudens National Historic Site in New Hampshire.

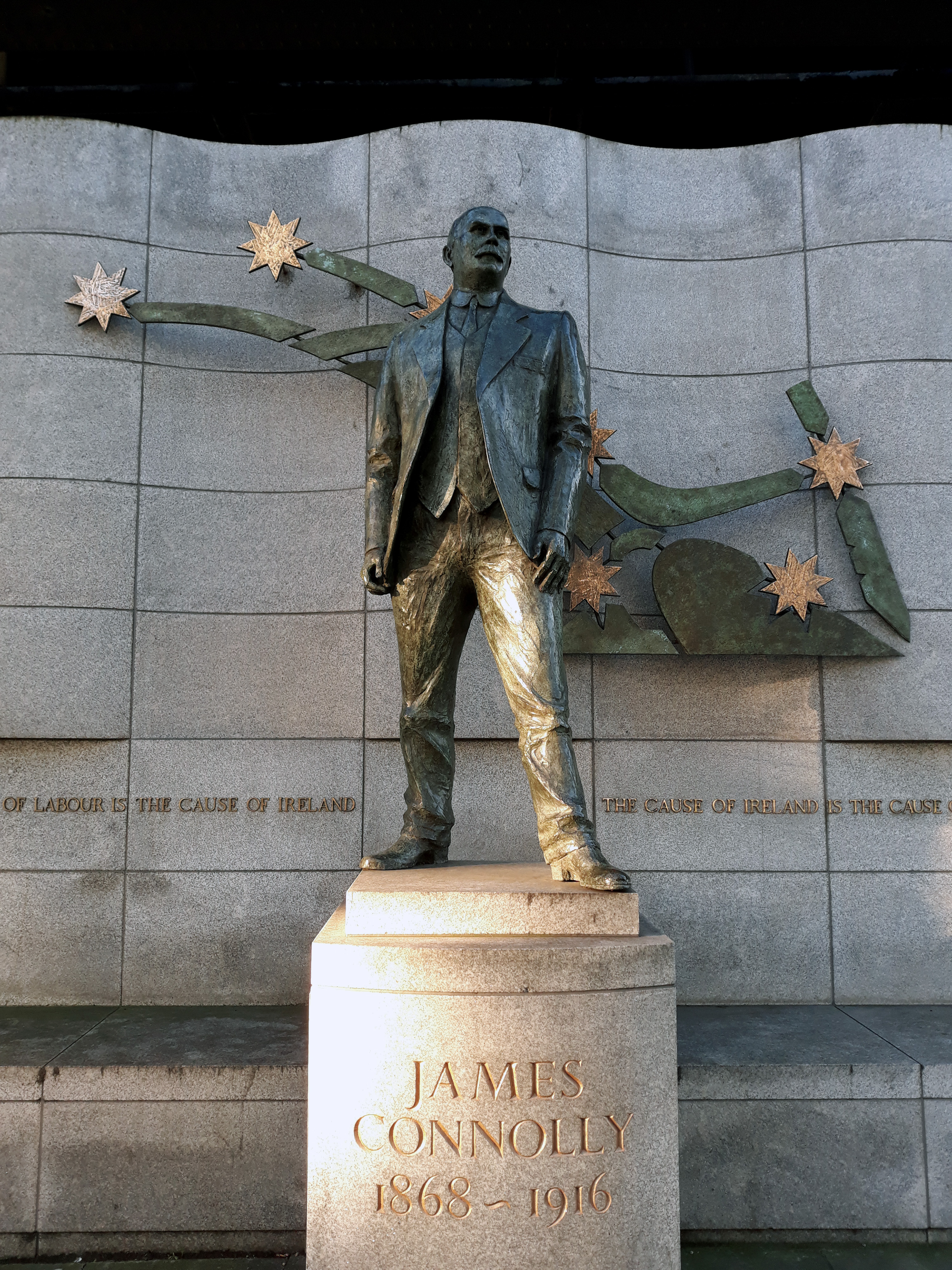
Connolly Memorial by Éamonn O'Doherty

In 2008, the writer Brian Lynch noted stylistic similarities between Saint-Gaudens' depiction of Parnell, and Éamonn O'Doherty's statue of James Connolly, also in Dublin:

Augustus Saint-Gaudens designed the Parnell monument in O'Connell Street, a work which seems to me to find an echo in O'Doherty's memorial to James Connolly in Beresford Place. While the situation is, to say the least of it, awkward (on one of Dublin's busiest junctions, stuck in under the Loopline Bridge), the representation of Connolly himself, by infusing the figure with a clerkly ordinariness, significantly avoids romantic revolutionary fervour. Whether conscious or not, this is an example of O'Doherty's sensitivity to the spirit of the age. His Connolly is still heroic, but he is troubled by a past more recent than 1916 or, indeed, the glorifications that accompanied the 1966 anniversary: his Parnell-like step forward into the future is made hesitant by the conflict in Northern Ireland.

== Gallery ==
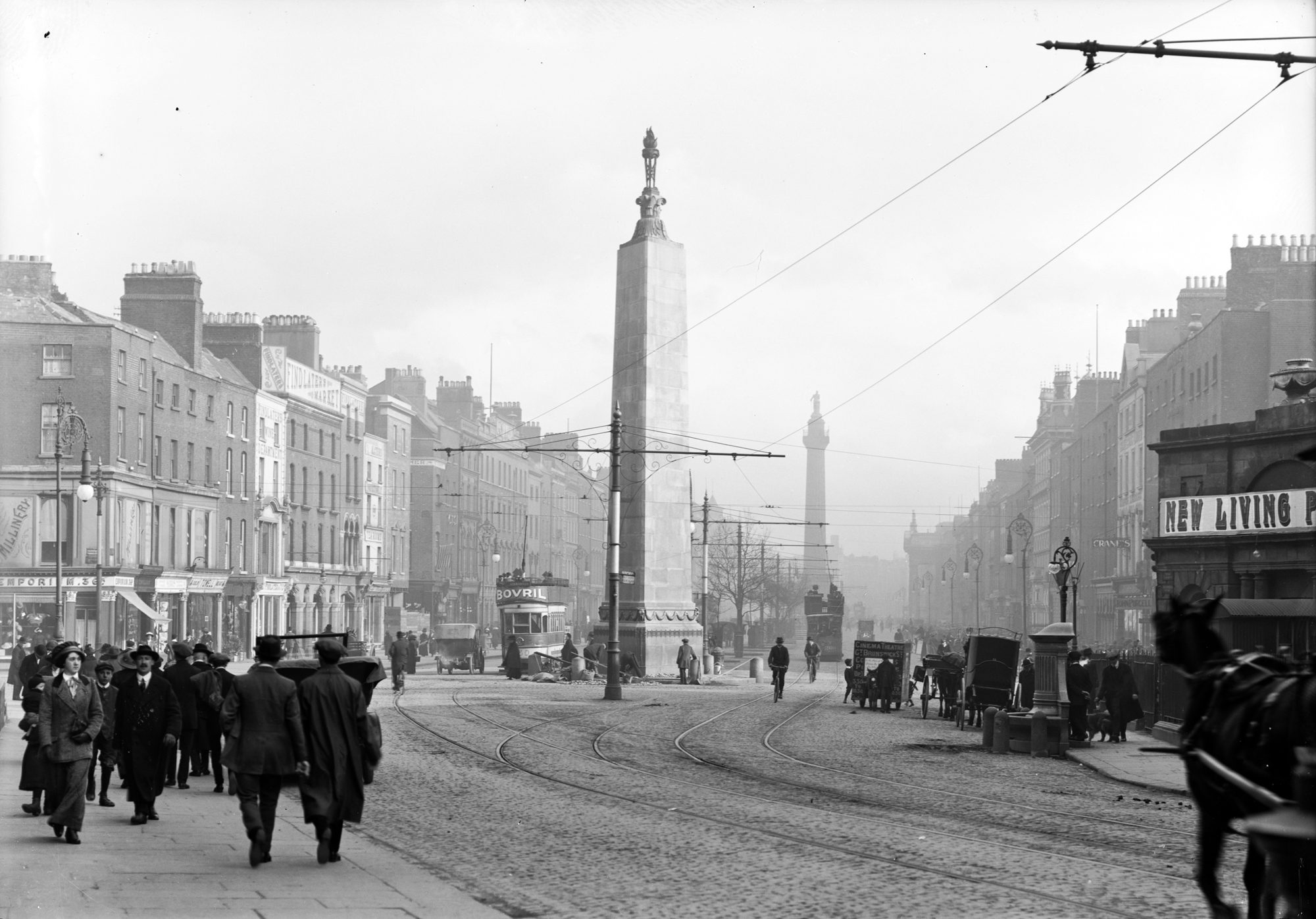
The monument with Nelson's Pillar in the background

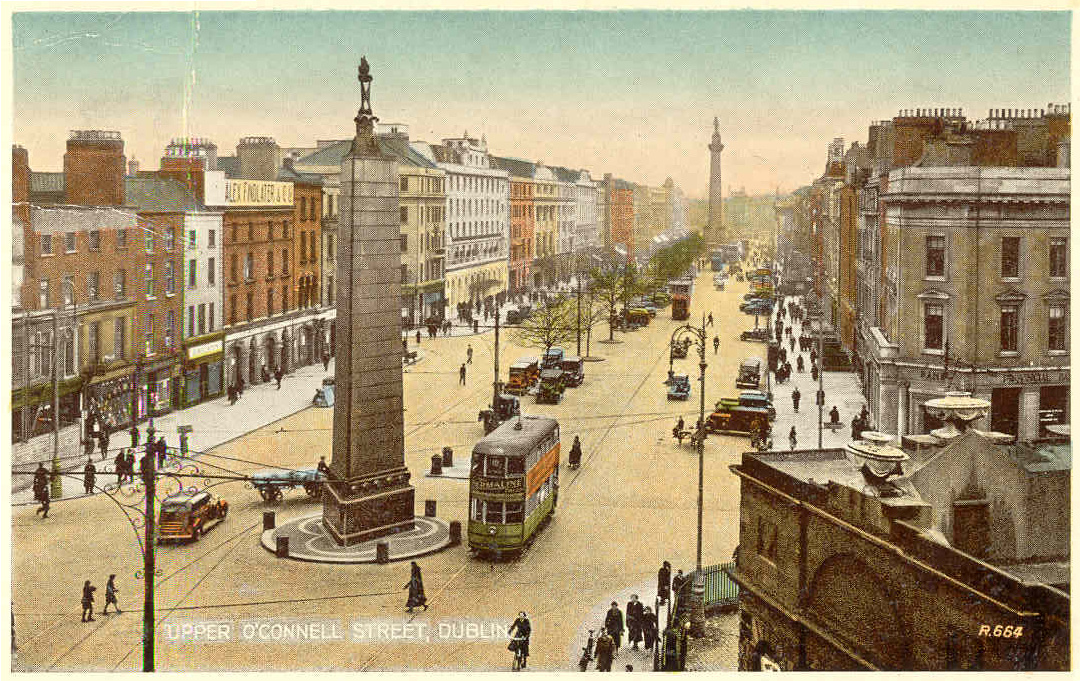
Early 20th-century postcard showing electric trams on Sackville Street

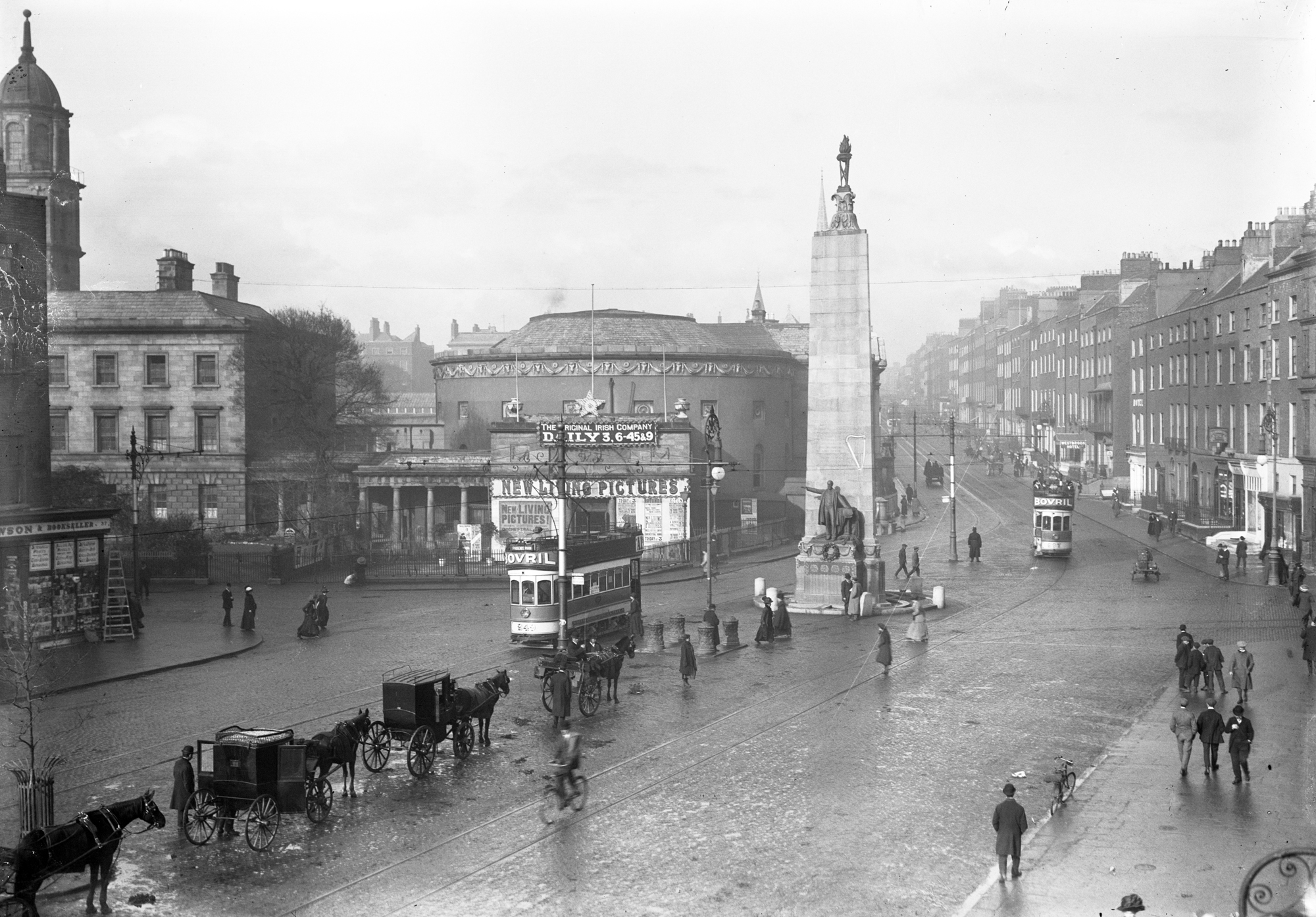
Dublin trams passing the monument circa 1913

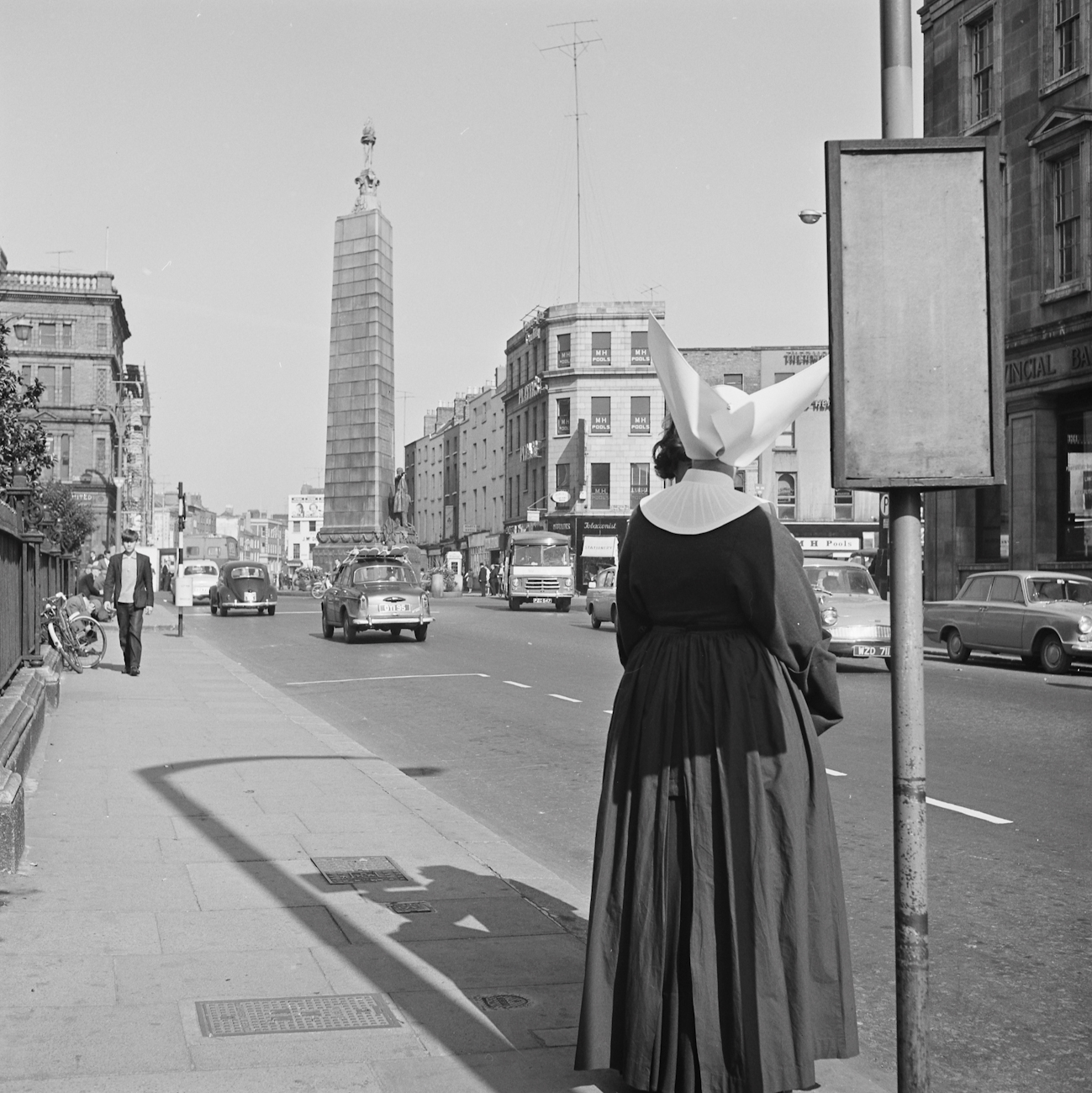
A nun waiting for a bus outside the Rotunda Hospital in 1964

A woman in front of the monument in 1969

Looking east, circa 1969

A streetscene in 1982

The monument in 1994

The monument at night

Statue and text on obelisk

A Luas tram heading west, with the monument to its rear, 2017

== See also ==
- List of public art in Dublin
- Parnell Monument, Creggs, County Galway, where Parnell delivered his last public speech
- Parnell Monument, Glasnevin Cemetery, a circular enclosure marking Parnell's grave
