= Shantalla =

Area in Galway City, Ireland

Coordinates: 53°16′27.25″N 9°4′7.41″W

Shantalla Seantalamh Shantallow
- District
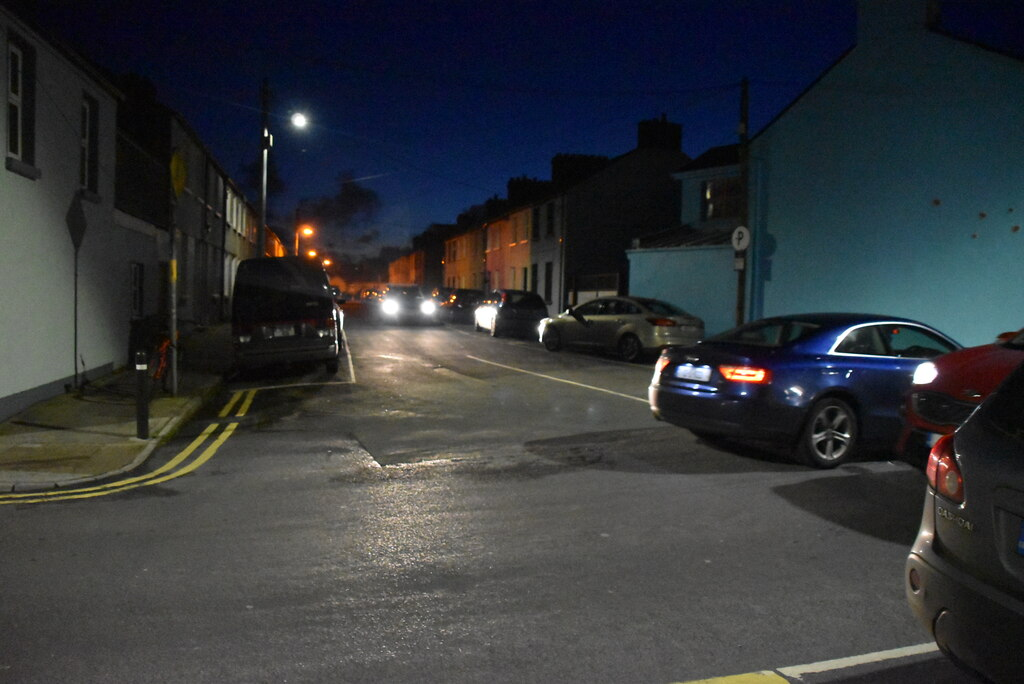
- Shantalla Road in 2019

- Location in Ireland
- Country: Ireland
- Province: Connacht
- County: County Galway
- Local government area: Galway City Council
- Time zone: UTC+0 (WET)
  - Summer (DST): UTC+1 (IST (WEST))

Shantalla or Shantallow (Irish: Sean talamh, meaning 'old ground') is a townland and suburban district in Galway City, Ireland.

== History ==
=== Granite quarry ===
In 1889, a granite quarry was opened in Shantalla by Scotsman John Miller, manager of the Galway Marble Works company. The granite sourced from Shantalla was of a "very fine mottled red or pink colour, with pleasant green shades running through it" and from an artistic point of view "it was said to be superior to Aberdeen granite." According to Quarry magazine, "there was an almost endless supply of beautiful varieties at Shantalla, all of which, when polished, would stand the effects of weather better than any known marble, native or foreign."

In 1898, a military officer named Colonel Arthur Courtney bought out Miller's interests in the quarry, and then employed Tapp & Jones for advice on the quarry, being mineral surveyors of Westminster. In 1900, the Galway Granite Quarry and Marble Works company was established.

Shantalla granite was used throughout Galway city and county as a building material and can be seen in the wall shafts of the Dominican church at the Claddagh. Further afield, the stone was used in the Parnell Monument in Dublin ("Pink-coloured, fined grained stone was used for the top of the monument"), as well as the base of the Fontenoy Memorial, a 6-metre high Celtic cross erected around 1906, which commemorates the 1745 Battle of Fontenoy in Fontenoy, Belgium. Polished granite from Shantalla was also used in the construction of the old Post Office building on Exhibition Road, South Kensington, London.

Other quarries existed contemporaneously in Galway city at Menlough, Angliham, Merlin Park and Twomileditch. At its peak, Shantalla quarry was producing 1,000 tonnes of worked stone per week, and in 1911 a branch of the Galway to Clifden railway line was constructed to serve it. The quarry went into decline shortly after 1911, and subsequently closed. Quarry lakes left by the enterprise were eventually filled in with rubble from the old Central Hospital after it was demolished, and later rubble from the old gaol. No remnant of the quarry site exists today.

=== Contemporary ===
Shantalla was the first council housing estate in Galway. As described in the book "The Story of Shantalla in the Words of its People", published in 2025:

In the late 1940’s, Galway Corporation devised a plan to construct the housing complex we know as Shantalla today. The site was four and a half acres facing a new road developed near the old road known as Red Lane. The proposed houses would contain a living room, three bedrooms a lavatory and a scullery. The external appearances would very between terraced houses, estimated to cost £350 0s 1d per house, and gable end houses, estimated cost £379 20d per house. The Corporation also took over a number of unfinished buildings known as 'The Bermingham Houses' as part of the scheme. Today they are called Shantalla Place. The plan was to clear some of the tenements in town and transfer the people to Shantalla. This caused some distress to some the 'townies' who were very nervous of moving, less than a mile, 'out the country'.

In 1970, a Traveller woman moved into Shantalla, but her new house was attacked almost immediately by a stone-throwing crowd.

== Notable people ==
- Catherine Connolly (born 1955), President of Ireland

== See also ==
- List of places in Ireland
