= O'Connell Monument =

Monument in Dublin, Ireland

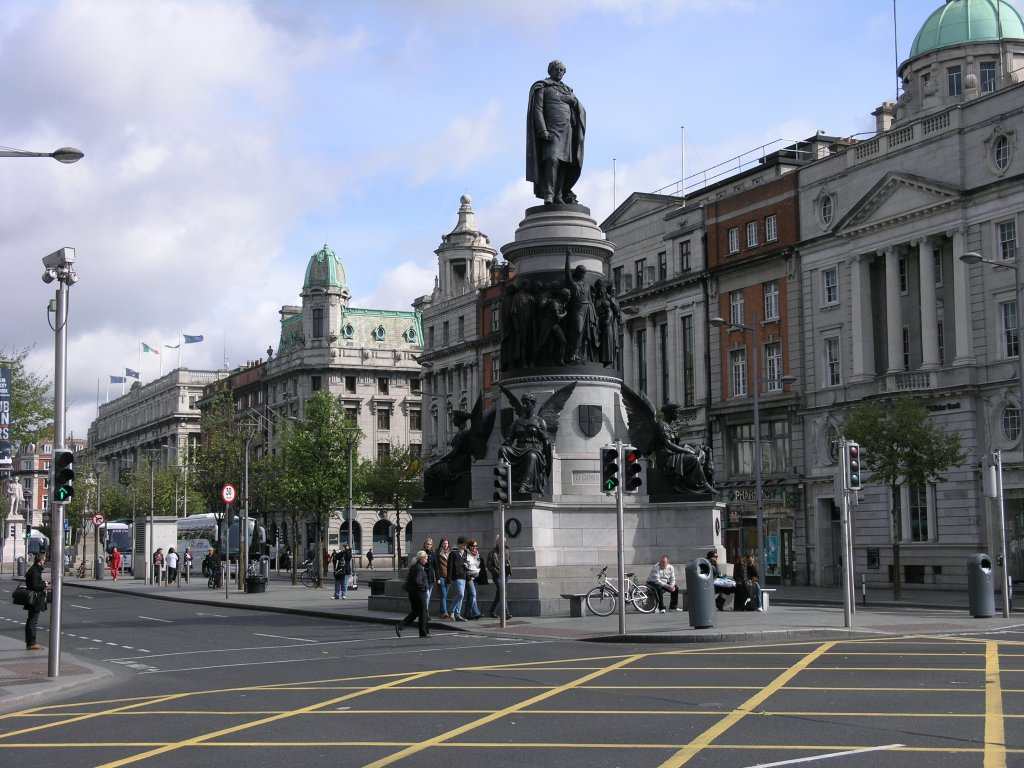
- Seen from O'Connell Bridge
- Artists: John Henry Foley, followed by Thomas Brock after Foley's death in 1874
- Year: 15 August 1882 (144 years ago)
- Type: Bronze and Dalkey granite
- Location: Dublin, Ireland; 53.3477°N 6.2593°W

The O'Connell Monument is a 40 ft high commemorative granite and bronze monument honouring nationalist leader Daniel O'Connell (1775–1847) located on O'Connell Street, the main thoroughfare of Dublin, Ireland.

The monument consists of a two-ton Dalkey granite foundation stone, on top of which are seated four winged victories (at angles), encircled above by a bronze frieze of over 30 figures in high-relief symbolizing Irish culture, surmounted at the top by the tall cloaked figure of O'Connell (at about 2.5 times life-size) looking southwards. A small pile of books lies at the base of O'Connell's left leg.

The O'Connell Monument was unveiled to the public on 15 August 1882 and the newly widened Carlisle Bridge was renamed O'Connell Bridge in honour of its new main focal point. What is now known as O'Connell Street, however, would remain named as Sackville Street until 1924.

== History ==
=== Conception ===
After O'Connell's death in May 1847, it was considered prudent to create a monument befitting of the man's legacy, and, if completed by 1875, could also celebrate the centenary of his birth. In 1864, the project was commissioned. This would not be the first statue of O'Connell to be raised in Ireland however, since one was already in place in Limerick and another in preparation for Ennis. However, as art historian Paula Murphy notes, these two commemorations "had a domestic flavour smacking almost of parochialism." According to Murphy:

The monument for the central thoroughfare in the capital city carried much wider national significance, in this instance of a Catholic nature. This was the first Catholic figure to be given such a public commemoration, and the only statue of a Catholic erected on the streets of Dublin in the nineteenth century. Such was the importance of this commission that it was accompanied by a very public debate which highlights issues of Irishness and insecurity.

=== Funding ===
A fund for the Dublin monument was promoted by several newspapers and the hierarchy authorised church door collections to achieve this aim. A committee naming itself the O'Connell Monument Committee was established following a public meeting in the Prince of Wales Hotel on Sackville Street, and adopted the resolution that "the monument would be to O'Connell in his whole character and career, from the cradle to the grave so as to embrace the whole nation." Sub-committees were set up in the provinces, and financial help was also received from as far away as New Zealand and South Africa.

It was noted in the O'Connell Street Monument Report (2003) commissioned by Dublin City Council that, at the time, "the decision to commemorate Daniel O'Connell with a monument in Sackville Street was an important move away from commemorating only members of the Castle administration or the British royal family", which had been the case up until that point.

As noted by art historian Paula Murphy in the Irish Arts Review Yearbook 1994, "The royal monuments to be seen in central Dublin in the first half of the nineteenth century dated from the 1700s and functioned not just as works of art, but as constant reminders of Ireland's continuing domination by a foreign power." However, concurrent to the drive to fund a monument to O'Connell, plans to erect a memorial to Prince Albert (1819–1861) were also underway in Dublin at the same time, with Dublin Corporation having already granted a location for this in front of the old Parliament House in 1864.

=== Foundation stone ===
On 8 August 1864, having already collected £8,362, the first stage of the monument's construction was achieved by the installation of a two-ton Dalkey granite foundation stone by Lord Mayor of Dublin Peter Paul McSwiney (a distant relative of O'Connell's). Delegations from all over Ireland were in attendance at the ceremony. The delegates from Belfast were mobbed by Orangemen on their return home followed by "days of sectarian riots" in the city, according to a 1969 article by The Irish Independent.

=== Design competition ===
Dublin Corporation took over responsibility of the monument thenceforth, and a competition for the design of the sculpture was initiated with a closing date of 1 January 1865. 60 designs were submitted and were described in the Irish Builder trade journal and exhibited in the City Hall, however all designs were eventually rejected by the committee.

With no resident Irish winner of the competition, Irish sculptor John Henry Foley, living in England and then working on the Albert Memorial amongst other commissions, took on the project. Murphy notes that "While nationalism as a fundamental concern in the selection of an artist was considered to be both isolationist and restricting, nonetheless those who felt 'that nothing great can be done upon our own soil and that everything great is to be sought in foreign lands' were instrumental in reinforcing a troubling sense of inferiority amongst the Irish."

Foley exhibited his model for the work in Dublin in 1867, and in August 1871, presented a progress report to the Corporation complaining of ill health and other work commitments which had been delaying his progress. Foley died in 1874 and his assistant Thomas Brock was formally commissioned in June 1878 to take his place.

=== Unveiling ===
The O'Connell Monument was finally unveiled to the public on 15 August 1882 "with much splendour" by Lord Mayor Charles Dawson, eight years after Foley's death. According to Murphy:

By this time the memory of Daniel O'Connell was no longer simply that of a glorified nationalist hero, and the unveiling, though treated as an occasion of public celebration, produced mixed feelings. The newspapers felt it necessary to warn the anti-O'Connellites of the need to behave with propriety. The confrontational nature of the statues on the streets of the capital became more evident as the century was drawing to a close. Just days after the O'Connell unveiling, a crowd of several hundred people surrounded the statue of William III in College Green yelling and throwing stones. The rioting and damage to the monument resulted in arrests.

The unveiling had ultimately failed to achieve its 1875 target, but did coincide with the centenary of the Volunteer Movement, and the occasion of the Industrial and Agricultural Exhibition which was taking place that same time in Dublin at the Rotunda Gardens (modern day Parnell Square). The monument was not totally finished by this stage however, as the four winged victories had not been added. These were finally installed in May 1883.

In 1890, the relatively new statue, as well as its prominent position, were mentioned in a tourist guidebook with the following note:

At the S. end of Sackville St. (the finest street in Dublin, and of unusual width), by O'Connell Bridge, is the O'Connell Monument, designed by Foley, and completed (1882) after his death by Brock. The bronze statue of the "Liberator" is fine.

According to a 1969 article in the Irish Independent, the monument cost "about" £12,500.

=== Features ===
In the frieze of characters below O'Connell, Erin (the female personification of Ireland) is seen facing the River Liffey holding the Act of Emancipation of 1829 in her left hand. The winged figures below the frieze represent Patriotism (holding a sword and shield), Fidelity (with an Irish Wolfhound), Eloquence (holding a book) and Justice (with a serpent).

== Damage ==
=== 1916 damage ===
The monument was damaged by gunfire during the Easter Rising of April 1916 and bullet holes can be still seen in sections of the bronze.

=== 1969 damage ===
As part of the Troubles, at about 4am on 26 December 1969, the Ulster Volunteer Force (UVF) bombed the base of the monument, shattering the statue that represents the 'Winged Victory of Courage' into four pieces. An Irish Army explosives expert confirmed that a time-bomb had been placed behind the figure. There were no injuries in the blast but some buildings and cars within a half mile radius were damaged. Police stopped cars on all main roads following the explosion, and a special check made on all vehicles heading for the Northern Ireland border in an attempt to apprehend those responsible. The same group had also bombed the grave of Wolfe Tone in County Kildare a few months prior in October 1969, and warned that "Further installations in Éire will be demolished so long as the puny Éire Army continues to keep its soldiers on the border of our beloved Ulster."

Bruce Arnold, Fine Arts correspondent for The Irish Independent noted at the time:

"Works of this sort are virtually impossible to evaluate and extremely difficult to repair if damaged, particularly because of the limited facilities in Ireland for heavy bronze casting".

Three years earlier, another prominent monument on the street, Nelson's Pillar, was severely damaged by explosives planted by Irish republicans.

== Composition ==
The sculptural section is composed of three main sections; a statue of O'Connell at the top, a frieze in the middle, and four winged victories at the base.

According to Professor Paula Murphy of UCD, sculptor Thomas Farrell may have been directly influenced by the presentation of Foley's composition for his own 1882 statue of Cardinal Cullen at St Mary's Cathedral, Dublin.

Writing of the public's relationship to their monuments in an Irish Times article in 2000, the historian Robert O'Byrne was critical of the O'Connell Monument, describing it as "vulgar, overblown and overbearing".

== Sackville street name change ==
In December 1884, two years after the unveiling of the statue, Dublin Corporation passed a resolution to rename Sackville Street as O'Connell Street but in 1885, aggrieved locals, with the Attorney General of Ireland arguing their case, secured a Court order holding that the Corporation lacked the powers to make such a change. The necessary powers were eventually granted in 1890, but it may have been felt best to allow the new name to become popular; over the years the name O'Connell Street gradually gained popular acceptance, and the name was changed officially, without any protest, in 1924.

== Gallery ==
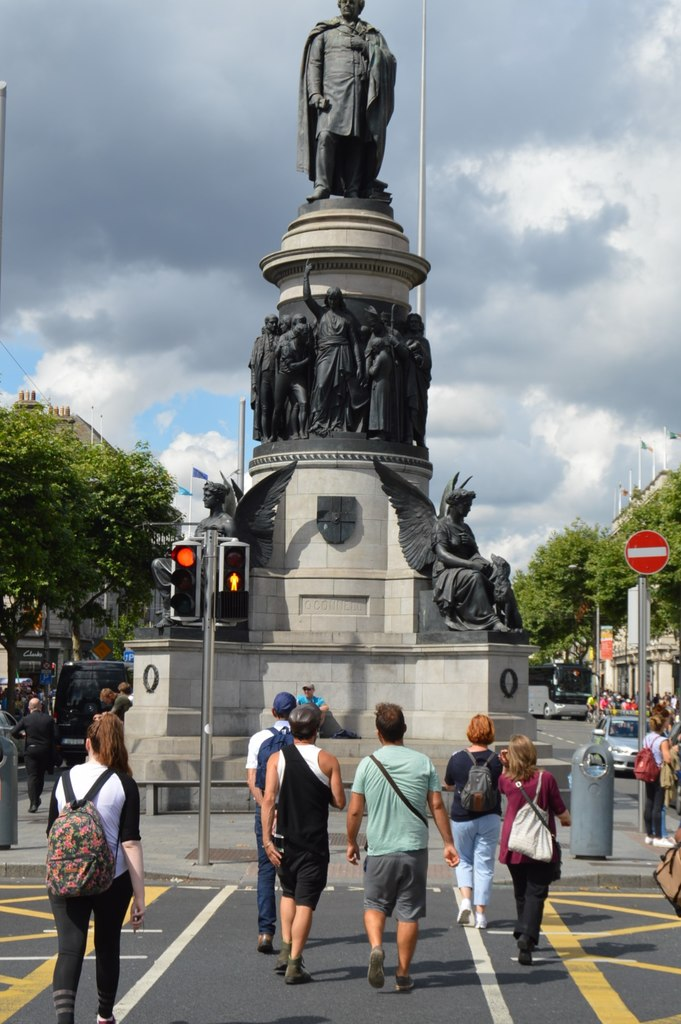
Seen from O'Connell Bridge

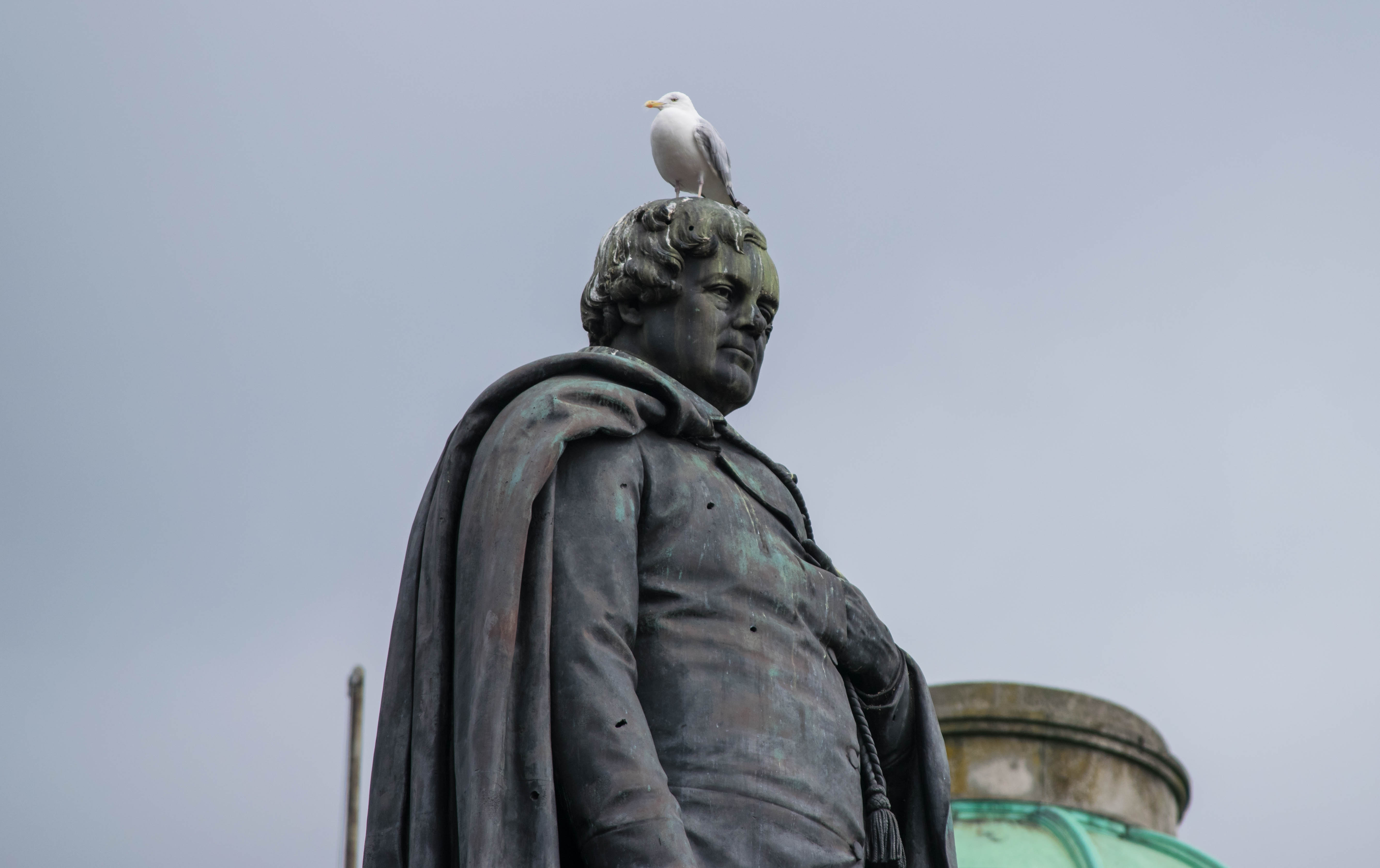
Close up of O'Connell (showing bullet holes)

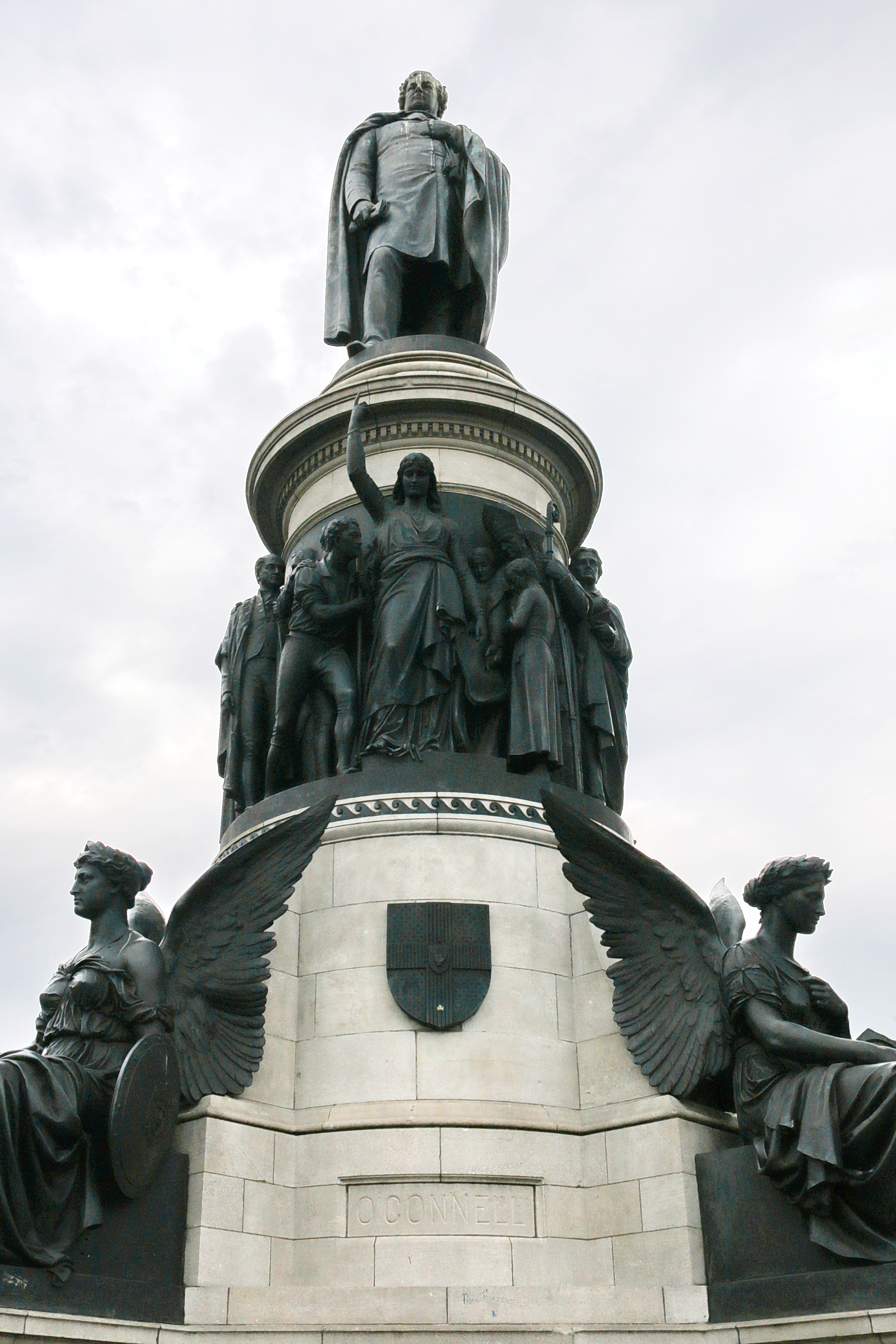
The monument in 2015

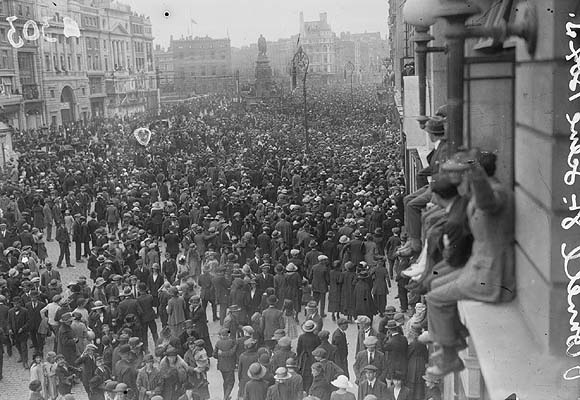
The monument in 1922

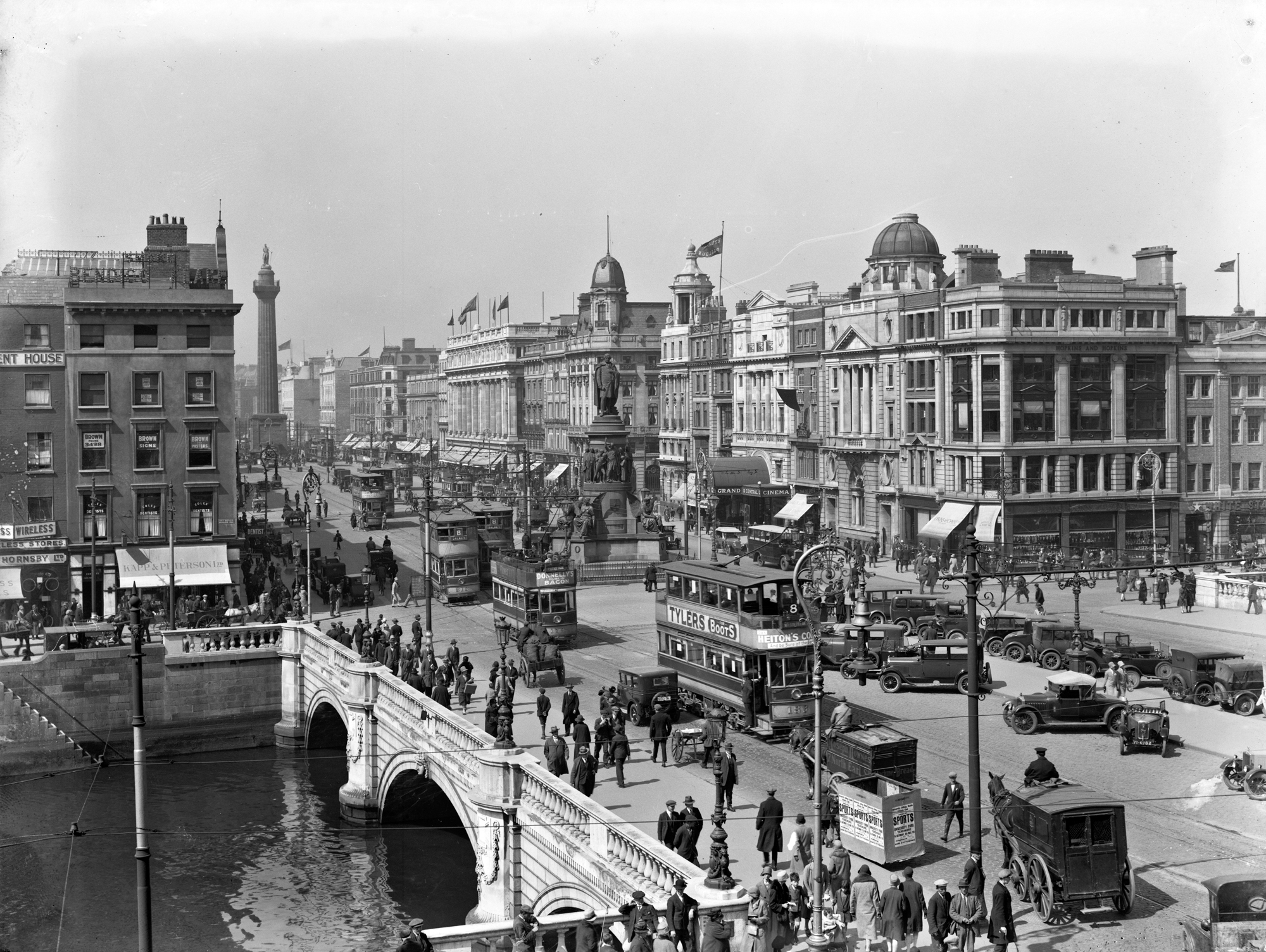
The monument in 1928

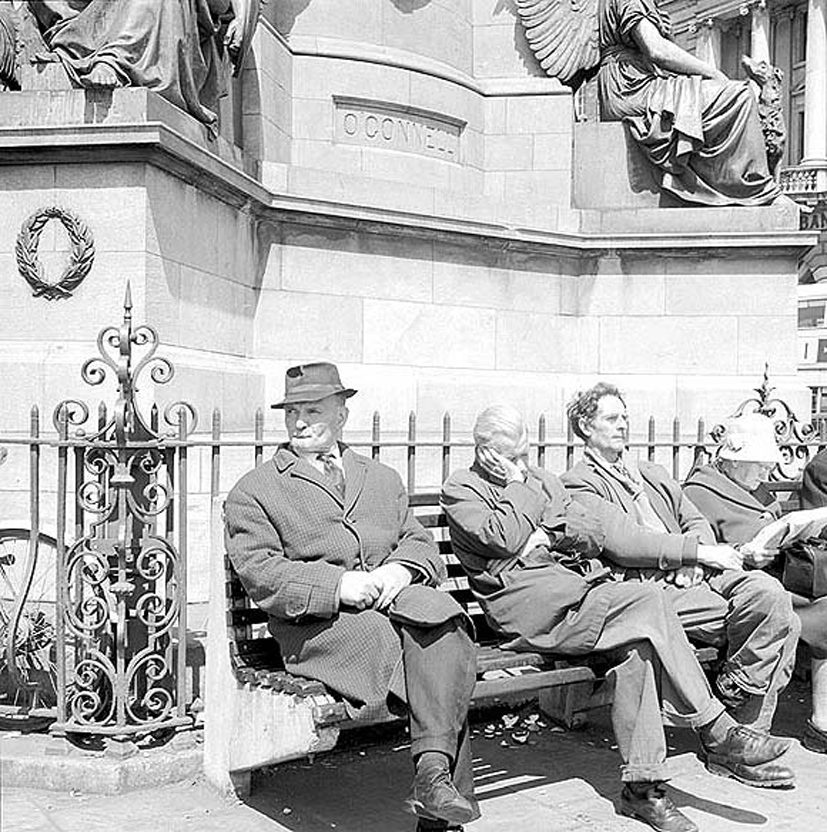
The monument in 1969

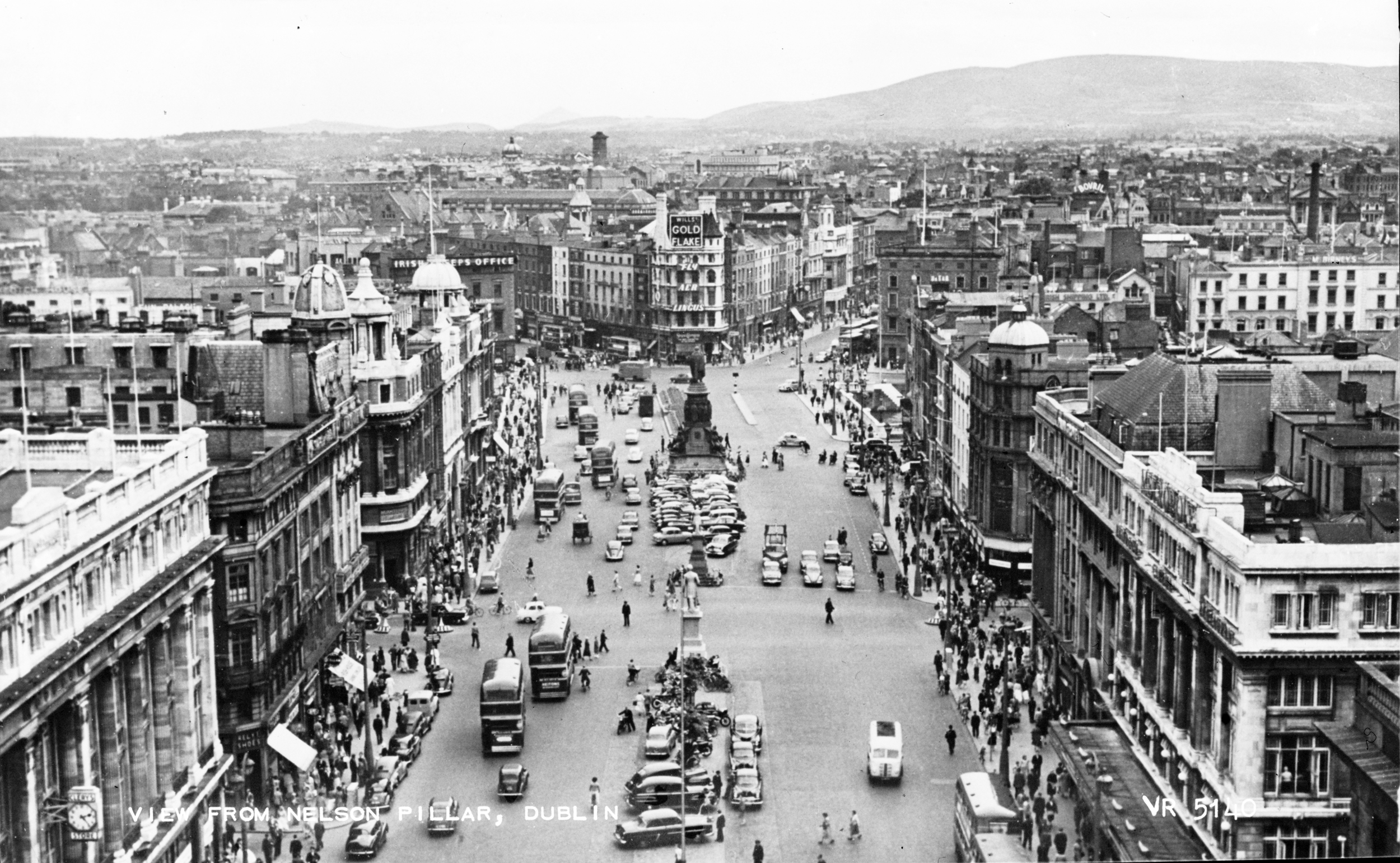
The monument as seen from Nelson's Pillar c.1958

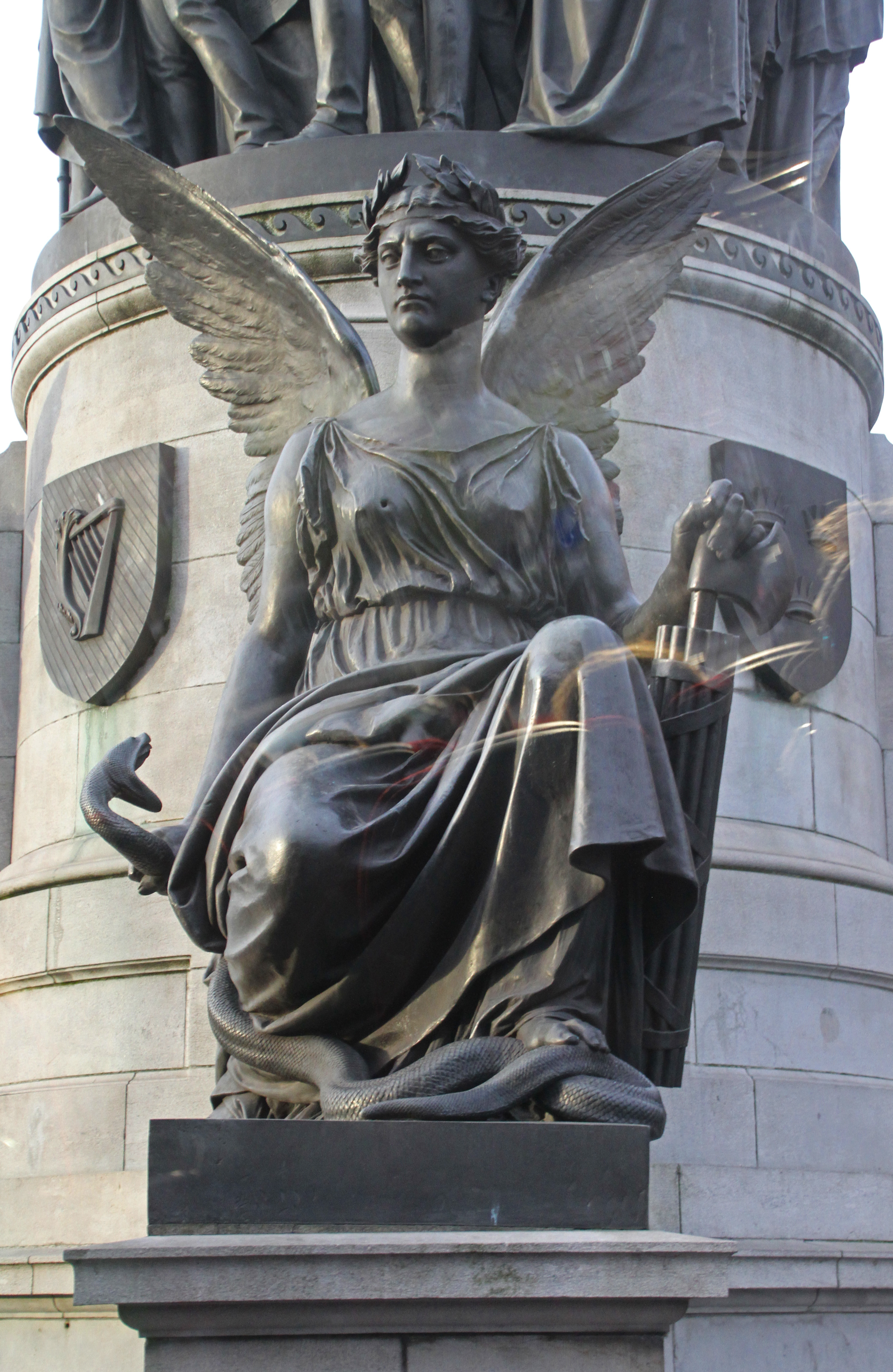
One of the four winged figures at the base of the monument

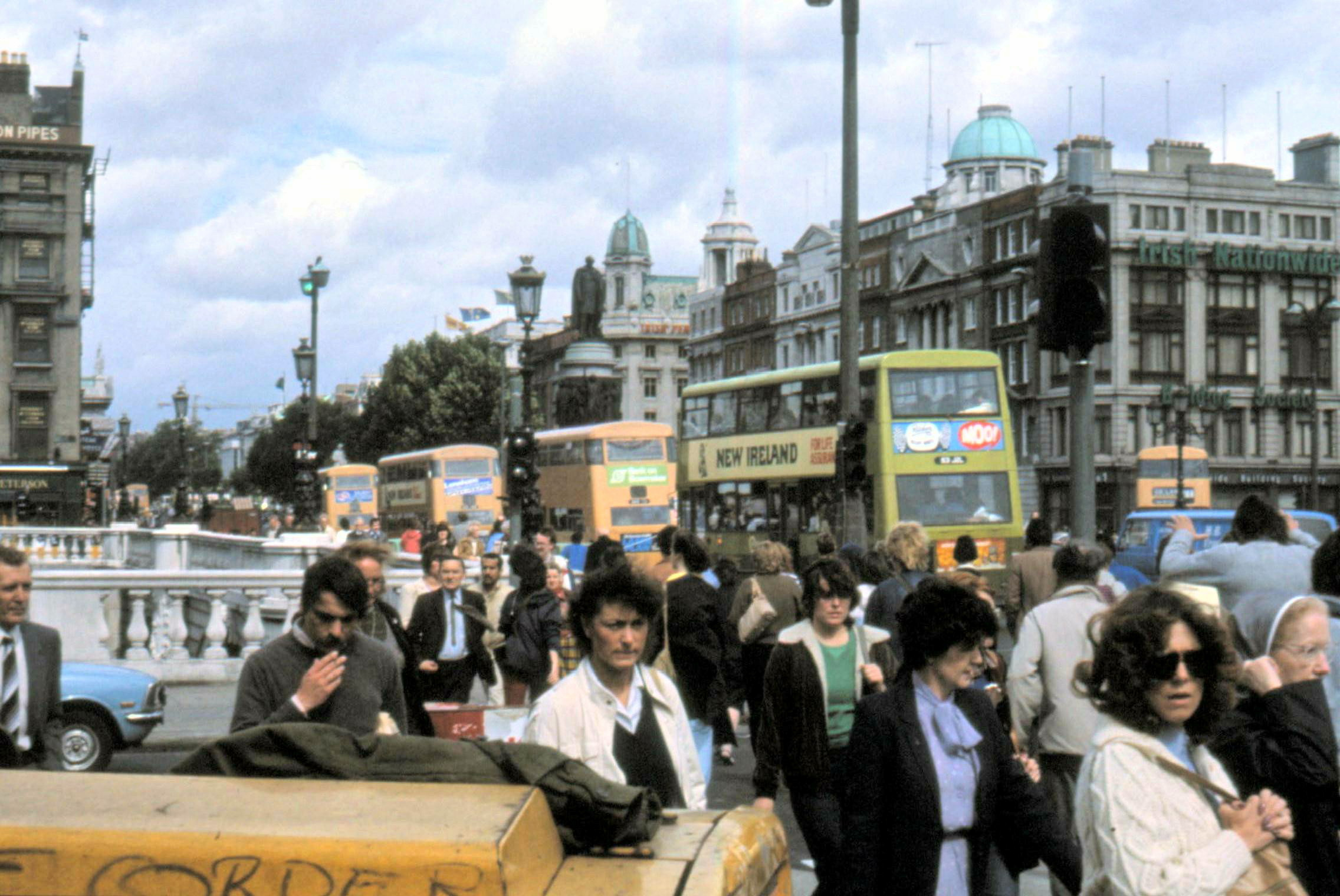
The monument seen from afar in 1982

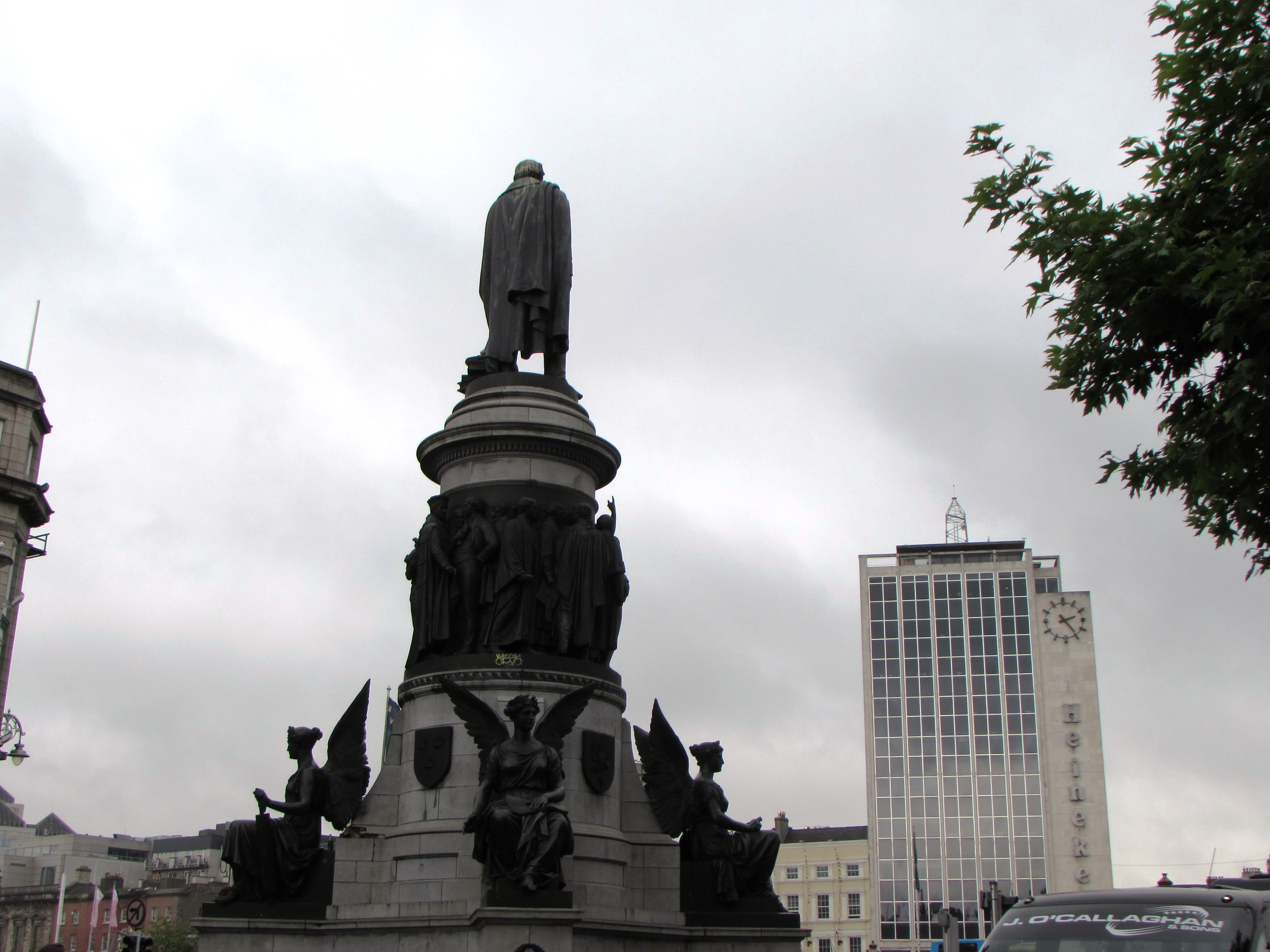
The monument from the rear, looking towards O'Connell Bridge House

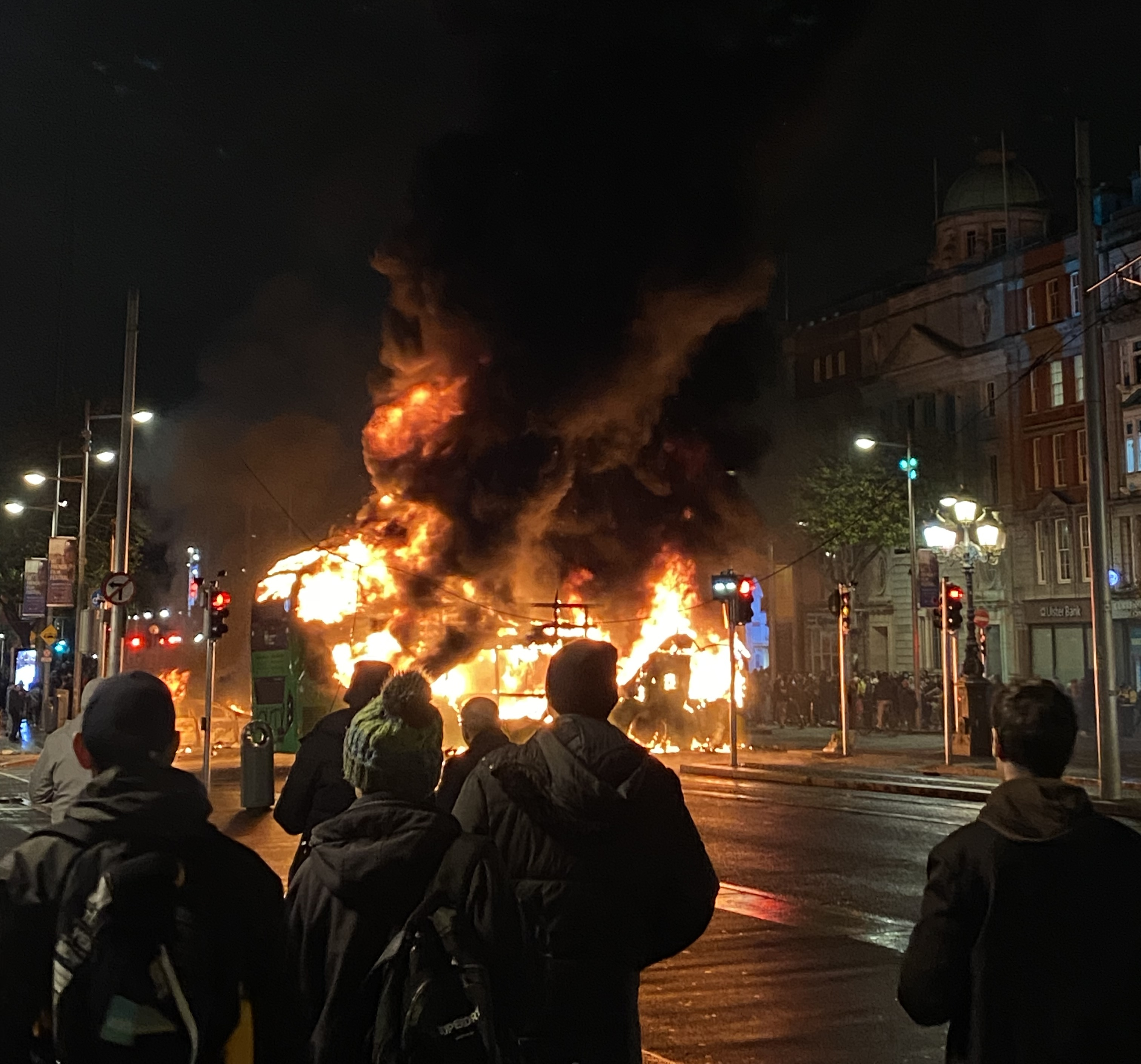
A Dublin Bus burning in front of the monument during the 2023 Dublin riot

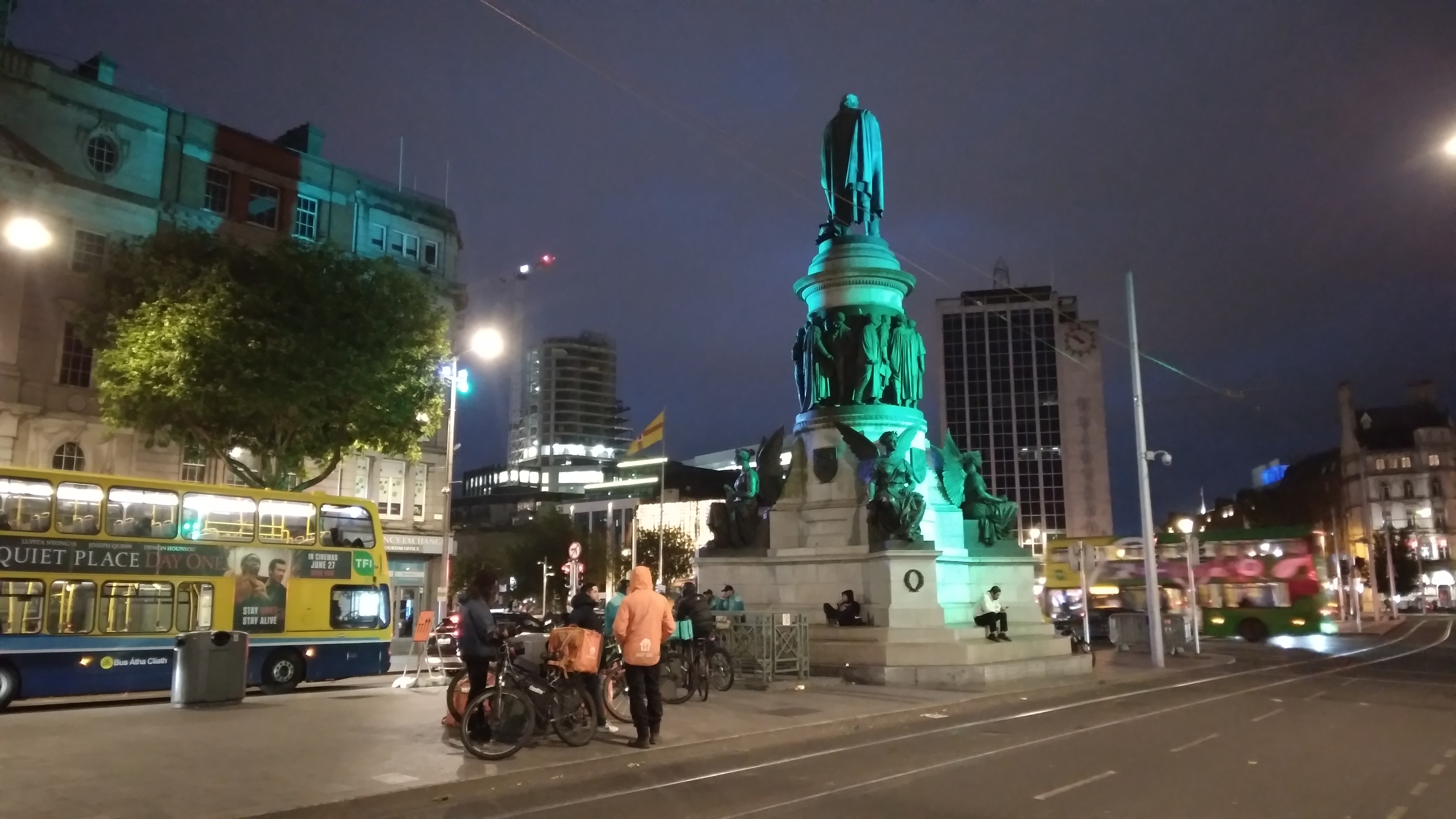
Deliveroo and Just Eat food delivery riders waiting at the monument for jobs to appear in the locality, June 2024

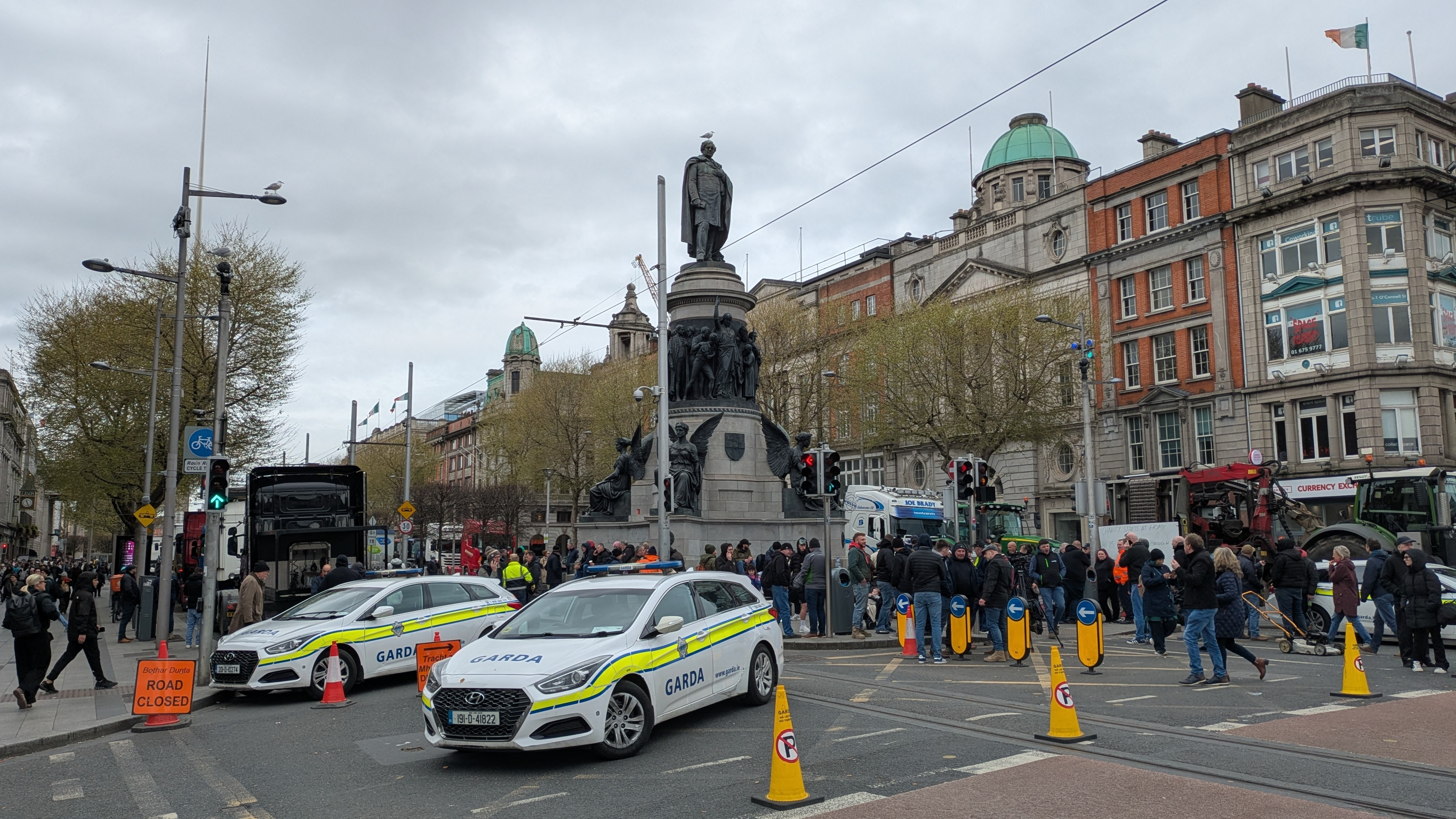
The monument during the 2026 Irish fuel protests

== See also ==
- List of public art in Dublin
