= Victor Llona =

Victor Llona Gastañeta was a writer and translator, born in Lima (Peru) in 1886, who died in San Francisco in 1953.

== Early years ==
The Peruvian Victor Marie Llona grew up in Paris where he attended the lycée Janson de Sailly and also a Jesuit college. At sixteen, he started visiting the literary cafés, where he met an international company, so diverse that they spoke Latin to be understood by all. The eldest of the group was an Irishman, named James Joyce (1882–1941).

In 1906, with his parents, Llona moved to the US and lived in Chicago. He remained in touch with Europe and through André Gide he had two of his short stories published in the Nouvelle revue française (1911 and 1913). Llona came back to Paris in 1913 but when the war broke out he returned to the US and lived in New York City, where he made the acquaintance of several novelists of the new generation. He decided that he would make them known in France.

== Important translator ==
Returning to France and having gained the confidence of Parisian publishers (Payot, Stock, Plon, Fayard, Albin Michel, La Renaissance du Livre, Gallimard), he was going to translate some forty books into French, between 1920 and 1939, amongst them Scott Fitzgerald (The Great Gatsby), Ambrose Bierce, Ezra Pound, Theodore Dreiser (An American Tragedy), Sherwood Anderson, Ernest Hemingway, Edna Ferber, Willa Cather and also several works by the Argentinian- English writer William Henry Hudson (1841–1922). With the help of a native Russian he was also able to translate several Russian works, from Alexis Tolstoï, Nikolai Gogol and Elie Ilf.

Llona also wrote in magazines, especially about James Joyce and Samuel Beckett. He also wrote two novels in French, one about the Ku Klux Klan, one about prohibition in the States. He also co-authored a biography of Peter the Great, with the Russian émigré Dimitri Novik.

== Part of the French literary scene ==
A few pages of Llona's Memoirs have been published, in which he speaks about his friendship with French writers, such as Pierre Benoît, Marcel Proust, Francis Carco, Henri Poulaille, Jean Galtier-Boissière, Jules Supervielle, Paul Morand, Pierre Mac Orlan, Jacques de Lacretelle, Julien Green and Roger Martin du Gard. He remained also a friend of major NRF figures, including André Gide, Jean Schlumberger, Valery Larbaud, André Ruyters and Jacques Rivière. Llona also had a major friendship with the Belgian poet and designer Jean de Bosschère (1878–1953), who made a lithographed portrait of him. He wrote an essay on the French writer Louis Thomas and befriended him and his opera-singer wife Raymonde Delaunois.

Llona remained in contact with American writers of the "Lost Generation": Hemingway, Ezra Pound, Nathalie Clifford Barney, Paul Bowles, Thornton Wilder and Scott Fitzgerald. They met in the apartments of Gertrude Stein and Peggy Guggenheim (1898–1979), or at the English bookshop of Sylvia Beach. In 1929 Shakespeare and Company published a book with twelve articles, brought together by Eugene Jolas (1894–1952), the editor of transition, defending "Work in progress", the book by James Joyce that a decade later became Finnegans wake. In this book, Our Exagmination Round His Factification for Incamination of Work in Progress, Llona's contribution was "I Dont Know What to Call It but Its Mighty Unlike Prose".

== Later life ==
In 1939 with war approaching, Llona, remarried, left France and established himself in Lima. In 1946 he returned to the US and became a translator for the UN Food and Agriculture Organization (FAO). Experiencing heart problems, he settled in San Francisco, where he died.

== Bibliography ==
Novels

- Les pirates du whisky, novel, Paris, Baudinière, 1928.
- Los piratas del whisky; novela. Tr. de MANUEL PUMAREGA. Madrid, Ed. M. Aguilar (Imp. J. Pueyo), 1927.
- La croix de feu (Le Ku Klux Klan), roman. París, Ed. Baudiniére, 1928.
- La croix de feu (Le Ku Klux Klan); roman. 2. ed. París, Ed. Baudiniére, 1930. [30]
- La Croix de feu (Le Ku Klux Klan), roman. 3. ed. París, Ed. du Saggitaire, 1946.
- Le mage de l'Archipel. París [1925?], inédit.
- Hiassim ou le voyage au tendre, París [1924?], inédit.
- L'Escale á Tripoli, in: Nouvelle Revue Française, Nº XXXV, pp. 585–613. París, 1911.
- La poursuite de la 'dancing girl', in: Nouvelle Revue Française. Nos. XLIX, París, 1913.
- Victor LLONA & Dimitri NOVIK, Pierre le Grand. París, Ed. J. Tallandier, 1931. 2 t.

Literary critic

- Notes sur Louis Thomas, París, 1924.
- Notes sur Louis Thomas, París, Ed du Siècle, 1925.

Translations Into French

- Willa CATHER, Mon Antonia, Paris, 1924.
- --- Prochainement Aphrodite, Paris, 1925.
- F. Scott FITZGERALD, Gatsby le magnifique, París P. Dupont, 1926.
- --- Gatsby le magnifique, 2. ed. París, P. Dupont, 1952.
- --- Gatsby le magnifique, 3. ed. París, P. Dupont, 1959.
- W. H. HUDSON, W. H. Le pays pourpre, (The purple land), París, Stock, 1927.
- --- Vertes demeures, roman de la forêt tropicale, París, Plon et Nourrit, 1929.
- --- Un flâneur en Patagonie, Delamain et Boutelleau, 1929.
- --- Le naturaliste a la Plata, 8 ed. París, Lib. Stock, Delamain et Boutelleau, 1930.
- Edna FERBER, Le Navire a Mélos, (Show Boat), París, Fayard et Cie, 1931.
- --- Le navire a Mélos, Bruxelles, Nicholson & Watson, 1948.
- Theodore DREISER, Une tragédie américaine, París, A. Fayard et Cie., 1932.
- Isadora NEWMAN, Dans le royaume des fleurs, París, 1928.
- Ernest HEMINGWAY, 50.000 dollars et autres récits, Paris, 1928.
- Peter NEAGOE, Tempête, récits, París, A. Michel, 1935.
- Sherwood ANDERSON, Un conteur se raconte: je suis un homme, París, 1928.
- --- Un conteur se raconte: mon pére et moi, París, 1928.
- Elie ILF & Eugène PETROV, Un millionaire au pays des Soviets,, Tr. by V. LLONA & P. STAVROV, París, A. Michel, 1934
- G. W. CABLE, Les Grandissimes, París, Payot, 1926.
- Ambrose BIERCE, Aux lisières de la mort, París Renaissance du Livre [1923?]
- Javier PRADO, The historical destinies of the United States, Lima, [194.?]
- Alexis TOLSTOY, Pierre le Grand, Tr. by P. STAVROV & V. LLONA. París, Gallimard, 1937.
- Nicolas GOGOL, Le Nez, Tr. by V. LLONA & P. STAVROV. París, E. Lowry [s.a.]
- Les Romanciers américains, nouvelles de S. Anderson, L. Bromfield, J. B. Cabell... [et al.], textes choisis par V. Llona, préf. et trad. de Victor Llona, Bernard Fay, A. Maurois [et al.], Paris, Denoël et Steele, 1931.

Into English

- Pierre BENOIT, Salt Lake, Tr. in English by FLORENCE & VÍCTOR A. LLONA, New York, Alfred A. Knopf, 1922.
- Elisabeth de GRAMONT, Years of Plenty, Tr. in English by FLORENCE & VÍCTOR A. LLONA, London, New York, J. Cape & Smith, 1931.

Souvenirs

- Victor LLONA, Entre dos guerras, in Garcilaso, año I, Nº 1, Lima, October 1945.
- Victor LLONA, Days and nights in Paris with Scott Fitzgerald, in: Voyages. Vol. 4, nos. 1 & 2 (winter 1971)
- Victor LLONA y Estuardo NUÑEZ, Obras narrativas y ensayos, Lima, Biblioteca Nacional del Perú, 1972.
- Victor LLONA, Memorias de la vida literaria en París, Unpublished

== Sources ==
- Theodore Dreiser Papers, University of Pennsylvania.
- Peter Neagoe Papers, Special Collections Research Center, Syracuse University Library
- Manuel BELTROV, Víctor M. Llona, in: Garsilaso, Año I, Nº 1, p. 30. Lima, 1940.
- Estuardo NÚÑEZ (see Wikipedia Spanish), Una novela peruana sobre el Ku-Klux Klan, in: El Comercio, Lima, 2/04/1965, p. 2.
- Estuardo NÚÑEZ, Víctor Llona, 1886–1953, in: Boletin de la Biblioteca Nacional, Lima, 1965, Nos. 33–34, p. 3–6.
- Estuardo NÚÑEZ, Semblanza de Víctor Llona, in: Alpha, Barranco, 1965, Nº 2, p. 1–10.
- Estuardo NÚÑEZ, James Joyce y Víctor Llona, in: Revista peruana de cultura, Nos. 7–8, Lima, junio de 1966, p. 221–228.
- Ernest KROLL, A note on Victor Llona, in: Voyages, Vol. 4, nrs 1–2, 1971
- Pascale ANTOLIN, Louis Thomas (1885-1962), Dictionnaire des Passeurs de la Littérature des États-Unis, (13 november 2023 - 6 october 2025), url : https://dicopalitus.huma-num.fr/notice/victor-llona-1886-1953/
- Andries VAN DEN ABEELE, Louis Thomas, biography, Nantes, Ars Magna, 2026.
