= Ronald Symond =

British writer (1895–1947)

Ronald Tudor Symond MC
- Born: 31 December 1895; Liverpool, England
- Died: 7 January 1947 (aged 51); London, England
- Occupations: Soldier, author, journalist
- Employer: Daily Mail
- Notable work: The Main Chance, Homage to Cricket

Ronald Tudor Symond MC was born in Liverpool, England in December 1895, the second son of a solicitor Elwy Davies Symond, and died at the age of 51 of a heart attack in London in February 1947. He is notable for his membership of the avant-garde, modernist, literary and artistic circles of the Left Bank of Paris in the 1930s.

== Early life ==
Symond spent his youth in Sefton Park, Liverpool, and attended Liverpool College, where he was captain of the First Eleven cricket team in July 1913. "Has made a popular and energetic captain. A really good bat, with splendid style, and plenty of scoring strokes. Has bowled well on occasions, and is a brilliant fielder in any position. Should lead the College to great victories next season" This laid the foundation for a lifelong interest in cricket.

== Military record ==
At the age of 19, in 1915, Symond enlisted and served in the Infantry for three years in Northern France, on the Western Front, during World War I. He attained the rank of Lieutenant in the 6th Battalion of the Liverpool Regiment, and was awarded the Military Cross in April 1918.

"For conspicuous gallantry and devotion to duty. He led a bombing attack with the utmost determination, and after a fight lasting for four hours, ejected the enemy from the trenches. He showed great courage and determination."

At that time 'a bombing attack' meant an attack using hand grenades.

He was then transferred to the Royal Flying Corps, which became the Royal Air Force in August 1918, and undertook training in England, returning to France as the war was ending. He resigned his commission in 1921.

Symond's elder brother Stuart was seconded to the Machine Gun Corps and his younger brother John to the Tank Corps. Both brothers survived the war but John was wounded after one week at the front and served in Britain until 1921.

On 26 February 1940 Ronald Symond enlisted again (in World War II). He was transferred to the Intelligence Corps on 15 July 1940 and attained the rank of Captain. He served until 1945. The Intelligence Corps was formally reconstructed in July 1940, having been disbanded after World War I.

== Literary critic and translator ==
Ronald Symond resided in both France and England between 1919 and 1939, becoming bilingual, and was a minor figure among the expatriate writers living in Paris in that period. He was therefore a member of the Lost Generation. He was active in literary criticism and published in the Parisian literary journal 'transition', which was edited by Eugene Jolas, who regarded Symond as one of his friends, together with Stuart Gilbert. The three of them organised an 'International Workshop on Orphic Creation' in 1932.

In March 1932 Symond published his translation of Mr. James Joyce et son nouveau Roman 'Work in Progress', by Louis Gillet. Later, in 1935, Gillet became a member of the Académie française, occupying 'Seat 13' out of the 40 seats.

Symond wrote a literary critique on Work in Progress by James Joyce, while it was being published in transition, and before it was published in its final form as Finnegans Wake. In April 1934 he published a critical review, The Third Mr. Joyce; Comments on 'Work in Progress'.

He was a signatory, together with Eugene Jolas, to a manifesto of expatriate writers living in Paris in the 1930s, entitled Poetry is Vertical.

== Non-fiction books ==
Ronald Symond wrote two books of non-fiction, during the inter-war years:

1. He published The Main Chance in 1926, a work of religion and philosophy, classified under 'Altruism, Life, Love'.
2. He published Homage to Cricket in 1935 . This was written under the pen name of Gryllus, a Latin word for the 'cricket' insect, a kind of grasshopper, as a clearly intended pun.

== Sports journalism ==
Before and after World War II, until his death in 1947, Symond worked as a sports correspondent for The Daily Mail, covering cricket and rugby matches. He reported at least one cricket Test match in which the Australian Don Bradman played, meeting Bradman in 1938, when he came to the Press Box. Symond's coverage of The Ashes in 1938 was syndicated in numerous newspapers in Australia. He died of a heart attack at the age of 51.

== Sources ==
- Deming, Robert H., 1964, A Bibliography of James Joyce Studies, University of Kansas Publications
