= Our Exagmination Round His Factification for Incamination of Work in Progress =

1929 work regarding James Joyce's then-unfinished Finnigan's Wake

- First edition
- Genre: Essay Collection
- Publication date: 1929

Our Exagmination Round His Factification for Incamination of Work in Progress is a 1929 collection of critical essays, and two letters, on the subject of James Joyce's book Finnegans Wake, then being published in discrete sections under the title Work in Progress. All the essays are by writers who knew Joyce personally and who followed the book through its development:

- Samuel Beckett ("Dante... Bruno. Vico.. Joyce")
- Marcel Brion ("The Idea of Time in the Work of James Joyce")
- Frank Budgen ("James Joyce's Work in Progress and Old Norse Poetry")
- Stuart Gilbert ("Prolegomena to Work in Progress")
- Eugene Jolas ("The Revolution of Language and James Joyce")
- Victor Llona ("I Dont Know What to Call It but Its Mighty Unlikely Prose")
- Robert McAlmon ("Mr. Joyce Directs an Irish Word Ballet")
- Thomas MacGreevy ("The Catholic Element in Work in Progress")
- Elliot Paul ("Mr. Joyce's Treatment of Plot")
- John Rodker ("Joyce and His Dynamic")
- Robert Sage ("Before Ulysses - and After")
- William Carlos Williams ("A Point for American Criticism")

Two "letters of protest" are also included in the Exagmination, from G.V.L. Slingsby ("Writes a Common Reader") and Vladimir Dixon ("A Litter to James Joyce"). "G.V.L. Slingsby" was the pseudonym of a woman journalist who complained about the difficulty of Work in Progress to Sylvia Beach, the publisher of Joyce's Ulysses. Since Joyce wanted the collection to contain negative as well as positive criticism, Beach invited the woman to write a pseudonymous article in dispraise of Joyce's new work. The journalist complied, choosing her pseudonym from Edward Lear's The Story of the Four Little Children Who Went Round the World.

Stuart Gilbert and Sylvia Beach believed that Joyce wrote the second letter of protest himself, as it is addressed to "Mr. Germs Choice" and "Shame's Voice" alternately (two puns on Joyce's name), and the letter itself is written in a pastiche of the punning style that Joyce was then using in his published work. Their assumption, however, was challenged and proven false by the discovery in the late 1970s of a number of books and letters authored by the historical Vladimir Dixon, a minor poet of Russian verse living in France during the 1920s.

== See also ==
- transition (literary journal)
