= Transition (literary magazine) =

Experimental literary journal

transition
- Cover of Issue 8 of literary magazine transition from November 1927
- Editor: Eugene Jolas
- Categories: Literary journal
- Frequency: Monthly (April 1927 – March 1928); Quarterly (April 1928 – Spring 1938)
- Circulation: 1000+
- First issue: April 1927
- Final issue Number: Spring 1938; 27
- Country: France
- Based in: Paris, then Colombey-les-deux-Eglises
- Language: English

transition was an experimental literary magazine that featured surrealist, expressionist, and Dada art and artists. It was founded in 1927 by Maria McDonald and her husband Eugene Jolas and published in Paris, France. They were later assisted by editors Elliot Paul (April 1927 – March 1928), Robert Sage (October 1927 – Fall 1928), and James Johnson Sweeney (June 1936 – May 1938). After the Second World War, the publishing license of transition was transferred from the Jolases and McDonald to Georges Duthuit who capitalized the title to Transition (1948–1950) and changed its focus.

== Origins ==
The magazine was intended as an outlet for experimental writing and featured modernist, surrealist and other linguistically innovative writing and also contributions by visual artists, critics, and political activists. It ran until spring 1938. A total of 27 issues were produced. It was distributed primarily through Shakespeare and Company, the Paris bookstore run by Sylvia Beach.

While the magazine originally almost exclusively featured poetic experimentalists, it later accepted contributions from sculptors, civil rights activists, carvers, critics, and cartoonists. Editors who joined the magazine later on were Stuart Gilbert, Caresse Crosby and Harry Crosby. Maeve Sage acted as secretary for the magazine during a portion of its Paris-based run.

== Purpose ==
Published quarterly, transition also featured Surrealist, Expressionist, and Dada art. In an introduction to the first issue, Eugene Jolas wrote:

Of all the values conceived by the mind of man throughout the ages, the artistic have proven the most enduring. Primitive people and the most thoroughly civilized have always had, in common, a thirst for beauty and an appreciation of the attempts of the other to recreate the wonders suggested by nature and human experience. The tangible link between the centuries is that of art. It joins distant continents in to a mysterious unit, long before the inhabitants are aware of the universality of their impulses....We should like to think of the readers as a homogeneous group of friends, united by a common appreciation of the beautiful, – idealists of a sort, – and to share with them what has seemed significant to us.

== Manifesto ==
The magazine gained notoriety in 1929 when Jolas issued a manifesto about writing. He personally asked writers to sign "The Revolution of the Word Proclamation" which appeared in issue 16/17 of transition. It began:

Tired of the spectacle of short stories, novels, poems and plays still under the hegemony of the banal word, monotonous syntax, static psychology, descriptive naturalism, and desirous of crystallizing a viewpoint... Narrative is not mere anecdote, but the projection of a metamorphosis of reality" and that "The literary creator has the right to disintegrate the primal matter of words imposed on him by textbooks and dictionaries.

The Proclamation was signed by Kay Boyle, Whit Burnett, Hart Crane, Caresse Crosby, Harry Crosby, Martha Foley, Stuart Gilbert, A. Lincoln Gillespie, Leigh Hoffman, Eugene Jolas, Elliot Paul, Douglas Rigby, Theo Rutra, Robert Sage, Harold J. Salemson, and Laurence Vail.

== Featured writers ==
Transition stories, a 1929 selection by E. Jolas and R. Sage from the first thirteen numbers, featured: Gottfried Benn, Kay Boyle ("Polar Bears and Others"), Robert M. Coates ("Conversations No. 7"), Emily Holmes Coleman ("The Wren's Nest"), Robert Desnos, William Closson Emory ("Love in the West"), Léon-Paul Fargue, Konstantin Fedin, Murray Goodwin, ("A Day in the Life of a Robot"), Leigh Hoffman ("Catastrophe"), Eugene Jolas ("Walk through Cosmopolis"), Matthew Josephson ("Lionel and Camilla"), James Joyce ("A Muster from Work in Progress"), Franz Kafka ("The Sentence"), Vladimir Lidin, Ralph Manheim ("Lustgarten and Christkind"), Peter Negoe ("Kaleidoscope"), Elliot Paul ("States of Sea"), Georges Ribemont-Dessaignes, Robert Sage ("Spectral Moorings"), Kurt Schwitters ("Revolution"), Philippe Soupault, Gertrude Stein ("As a Wife Has a Cow a Love Story").

Some other artists, authors and works published in transition included Samuel Beckett ("Assumption", "For Future Reference"), Kay Boyle ("Dedicated to Guy Urquhart"), H. D. ("Gift", "Psyche", "Dream", "No", "Socratic"), Max Ernst ("Jeune Filles en des Belles Poses", "The Virgin Corrects the Child Jesus before Three Witnesses"), Stuart Gilbert ("The Aeolus Episode in Ulysses", "Function of Words", "Joyce Thesaurus Minusculus"), Juan Gris ("Still Life"), Ernest Hemingway ("Three Stories", "Hills like White Elephants"), Franz Kafka (The Metamorphosis), Alfred Kreymborg (from: Manhattan Anthology), Pablo Picasso ("Petite Fille Lisant"), Muriel Rukeyser ("Lover as Fox"), Gertrude Stein ("An Elucidation", "The Life and Death of Juan Gris", "Tender Buttons", "Made a Mile Away"), William Carlos Williams ("The Dead Baby", "The Somnambulists", "A Note on the Recent Work of James Joyce", "Winter", "Improvisations", "A Voyage to Paraguay").

Also Paul Bowles, Bob Brown, Kathleen Cannell, Malcolm Cowley, Hart Crane, Abraham Lincoln Gillespie Jr. (on music), Eugene Jolas (also as "Theo Rutra"), Marius Lyle, Robert McAlmon, Archibald McLeish Allen Tate; Bryher, Morley Callaghan, Rhys Davies, Robert Graves, Sidney Hunt, Robie Macauley, Laura Riding, Ronald Symond, Dylan Thomas.

Christian Zervos' article Picasso à Dinard was featured in the Spring 1928 issue. No. 26, 1937, with a Marcel Duchamp cover, featured Hans Arp, Man Ray, Fernand Léger, László Moholy-Nagy, Piet Mondrian, Alexander Calder and others.

A third to half the space in the early years of transition was given to translations, some of which done by Maria McDonald Jolas; French writers included: André Breton, André Gide and the Peruvian Victor Llona; German and Austrian poets and writers included Hugo Ball, Carl Einstein, Yvan Goll, Rainer Maria Rilke, René Schickele, August Stramm, Georg Trakl; Bulgarian, Czech, Hungarian, Italian, Polish, Russian, Serbian, Swedish, Yiddish, and Native American texts were also translated.

Perhaps the most famous work to appear in transition was Finnegans Wake, by James Joyce. Many segments of the unfinished novel were published under the name of Work in Progress.

== Featured artists ==
While transition was foremost a literary review, it also featured avant-garde visual art, beginning with its inaugural issue (April 1927), which included reproductions of paintings by Max Ernst, Lajos Tihanyi, and Pavel Tchelitchew. The periodical's cover initially bore only textual elements; but commencing with the thirteenth issue, Jolas began to feature art on the outside of his publication as well–much of it created specifically for transition. In the order of their appearance, the magazine's covers included art by Pablo Picasso, Stuart Davis, Man Ray, Gretchen Powel, Kurt Schwitters, Eli Lotar, Jean Arp, Sophie Taeuber-Arp, Paul Klee, Fernand Léger, Joan Miró, Marcel Duchamp, and Wassily Kandinsky. In his essay "Fontierless Decade", in the magazine's final issue, Jolas reflected that "all the new painters, photographers, and sculptors were reproduced [in transition], beginning in 1927, when many of them were unknown outside of a small circle on the continent." While Jolas's program for his magazine was outwardly focused on literature, his comments in his essay "A New Vocabulary" indicate that he considered visual art's inventiveness to be a model for the possibilities of the poetic word. He wrote: "While painting . . . has proceeded to rid itself of the descriptive, done away with classical perspective, has tried more and more to attain a purity of abstract idealism, should the art of the word remain static?"

Much of the visual art in transition belongs to a small number of avant-garde moments that later became a part of the Modernist canon, especially (but not exclusively) Dada, Surrealism, Cubism, and Constructivism. Other artistic selections, like the reproduction of Marie Monnier's embroidery Birth, in transition no. 4, highlight Jolas's interest in both new and re-invented means of expression as well as marking the milieu in which he and his co-editors worked and socialized. For instance, Jolas knew Marie Monnier's sister, Adrienne Monnier, proprietor of the bookstore La Maison des Amis des Livres, where Marie's work was exhibited in 1927. Moreover, the writer Léon-Paul Fargue, who Jolas admired and included in his magazine, wrote text the catalog to the 1927 exhibition of Marie Monnier's embroidery. Similarly, Jolas obtained a number of the reproductions of Surrealist paintings and objects that appeared in the magazine's first two years–including work by Yves Tanguy, who was little known at the time–by way of his friend Marcel Noll, who was director of the Galerie Surréaliste until it closed in 1928. Transition, in turn, ran advertisements for the gallery in several issues.

== Post-war revival ==
Transition (1948–1950)
- Editor: Georges Duthuit
- Categories: Literary magazine
- First issue: February 1948
- Final issue: October 1950
- Country: France
- Based in: Paris
- Language: English

Transition was the short-lived post-war revival of transition. While Transition was edited by Georges Duthuit who had bought the copyright to use the name "Transition," the Jolases remained a part of the project. Eugene Jolas was on the editorial board and Maria Jolas was heavily involved. The name "Transition" was usually followed by the last two digits of the year it was published (e.g. Transition Forty-Eight).

Transition was less international and had a less diverse selection of media than its predecessor. In the introduction, the project of the magazine was set forth as "to assemble for the English-speaking world the best of French art and thought, whatever the style or whatever the application" although its audience was primarily American.

Samuel Beckett had many pieces published in Transition, along with working as a translator for about 30 pieces from the magazine. Most of Beckett's work for the magazine was unsigned, so the extent of his contributions are unclear. A compilation of letters between Beckett and Duthuit, Three Dialogues, was originally published in Transition Forty-Nine.

== See also ==
- List of literary magazines
