= Diabolically Yours =

1967 film by Julien Duvivier

- French theatrical release poster
- French: Diaboliquement vôtre
- Directed by: Julien Duvivier
- Screenplay by: Julien Duvivier; Paul Gégauff (uncredited)
- Based on: Manie de la persécution by Louis Thomas
- Starring: Alain Delon; Senta Berger; Peter Mosbacher; Claude Piéplu; Albert Augier; Sergio Fantoni
- Cinematography: Henri Decaë
- Edited by: Paul Cayatte
- Music by: François de Roubaix
- Production companies: Lira Films; Copernic; Comacico; Societé Nouvelle de Cinématographie (SNC); Igor Film; Eichberg-Film GmbH
- Distributed by: Valoria Films (France); Columbia-Bavaria (West Germany)
- Release dates: 22 December 1967 (France); 20 August 1968 (West Germany)
- Running time: 95 minutes
- Countries: France; Italy; West Germany
- Language: French
- Box office: 836,942 admissions (France)

Diabolically Yours (French: Diaboliquement vôtre) is a 1967 psychological thriller film starring Alain Delon and Senta Berger. It was the last film by director Julien Duvivier.

== Plot ==
Waking from a three-week coma in a private clinic with amnesia, a man is told that he survived a car crash and that he is Georges Campo, a name he does not recognize. A beautiful woman he does not know, who says she is his wife Christiane, takes him to recuperate in a mansion in walled grounds. With her is a doctor, Frédéric Launay, who says he is an old friend from their days in business together in Hong Kong. At the mansion, they are greeted by the half-Chinese butler, Kim, who is offhand with him but has a suspiciously close relationship with Christiane. He is told that he must rest and take copious medication, while Christiane adds that there is no hope of any marital relations until he is fully well.

Voices start troubling him at night and he suffers nightmares, in one of which he is a coarse soldier called Pierre Lagrange fighting in Algeria. He discovers that he cannot get out of the grounds, that there is no telephone and that he is a prisoner. He suspects attempts on his life: an unsecured trap door opens under him, a large dog attacks him, and a chandelier falls on him at dinner.

He realizes he cannot be Georges Campo, because only Christiane and Frédéric claim he is, and that Campo must therefore be dead. While Frédéric is away one night, he forces himself on the not wholly unwilling Christiane and at breakfast tells Frédéric. Enraged at her treachery, he starts beating her, upon which the jealous Kim knifes him. She responds by shooting Kim and then confesses the whole plot. She and Frédéric had killed her husband Georges secretly but then needed a public death so they could marry and take over the Hong Kong business. They got the ex-soldier Pierre Lagrange drunk and crashed the car, but he survived. Then they had further attempts at killing him, which failed. Christiane offers to be a wife and business partner to him if he will carry on as Georges Campo. The police, when called to investigate the two deaths, do not believe him, however.

== Cast ==
- Alain Delon as Pierre Lagrange / Georges Campo
- Senta Berger as Christiane
- Peter Mosbacher as Kim
- Claude Piéplu as interior decorator
- Sergio Fantoni as Frédéric Launay

== Production ==
Diabolically Yours was based on the novel Manie de la persécution by Louis Thomas. The novel was adapted by Julien Duvivier, Roland Girard, and Jean Bolvary with dialogue written by Paul Gégauff.

== Release ==
Diabolically Yours was released in France on 22 December 1967 and in West Germany on 20 August 1968.

== Reception ==
The film was a box office failure.

In a contemporary review, the Monthly Film Bulletin stated that "It is a pity that Duvivier's extraordinarily uneven career should have ended with this rather lame thriller." Gene Moskowitz, in his review for Variety, found the film to be a "somewhat oldhat… fairly obvious attempt at a psycho thriller."
