= Finnegans Wake =

1939 novel by James Joyce

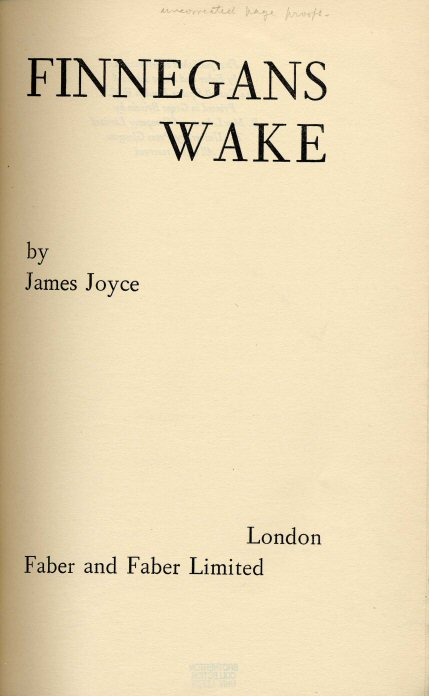
- Author: James Joyce
- Language: English
- Publisher: Faber and Faber
- Publication date: 4 May 1939
- OCLC: 42692059
- Dewey Decimal: 823/.912 21
- LC Class: PR6019.O9 F5 1999
- Preceded by: Finn's Hotel (1923)

Finnegans Wake is a novel by the Irish writer James Joyce. It was published in installments starting in 1924, under the title "fragments from Work in Progress". The final title was revealed only when the book was published on 4 May 1939.

Although the base language of the novel is English, it is an English that Joyce modified by combining and altering words from many languages into his own distinctive idiom. Some commentators believe this technique was Joyce's attempt to reproduce the way that memories, people, and places are mixed together and transformed in a dreaming or half-awakened state.

The initial reception of Finnegans Wake was largely negative, ranging from bafflement at its radical reworking of language to open hostility towards its seeming pointlessness and lack of respect for literary conventions. Joyce, however, asserted that every syllable was justified. Its allusive and experimental style has resulted in it having a reputation as one of the most difficult works in literature.

Despite the obstacles, readers and commentators have reached a broad consensus about the book's central cast of characters and, to a lesser degree, its plot. The book explores the lives of the Earwicker family, comprising the father HCE; the mother ALP; and their three children: Shem the Penman, Shaun the Postman, and Issy. Following an unspecified rumour about HCE, the book follows his wife's attempts to exonerate him with a letter, his sons' struggle to replace him, and a final monologue by ALP at the break of dawn. Emphasizing its cyclical structure, the novel ends with an unfinished line that completes the fragment with which it began.

== Background and composition ==
Having completed work on Ulysses, Joyce was so exhausted that he did not write a line of prose for a year. On 10 March 1923, he wrote a letter to his patron, Harriet Shaw Weaver: "Yesterday I wrote two pages—the first I have since the final Yes of Ulysses. Having found a pen, with some difficulty I copied them out in a large handwriting on a double sheet of foolscap so that I could read them." This is the earliest reference to what would become Finnegans Wake.

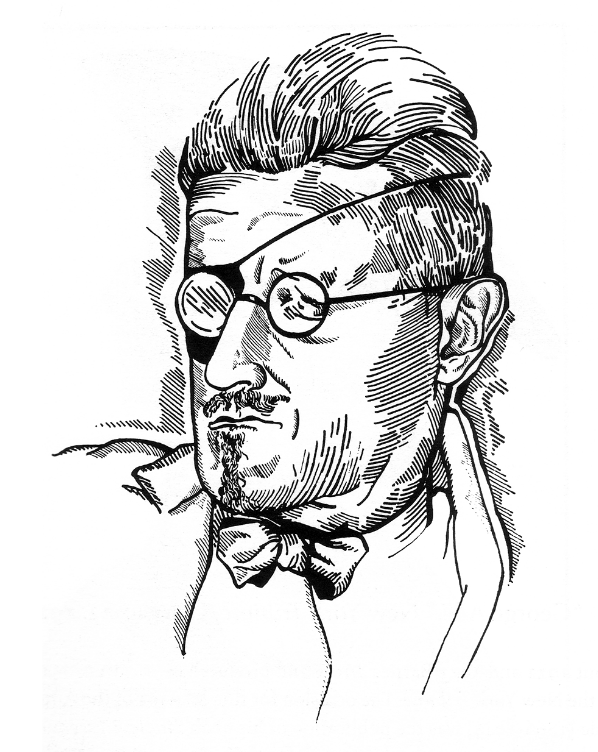
A drawing of Joyce (with eyepatch) by Djuna Barnes from 1922, the year in which Joyce began the 17-year task of writing Finnegans Wake

The two pages in question consisted of the short sketch "Roderick O'Conor", concerning the historic last king of Ireland cleaning up after guests by drinking the dregs of their dirty glasses. Joyce completed another four short sketches in July and August 1923, while holidaying in Bognor. The sketches, which dealt with different aspects of Irish history, are commonly known as "Tristan and Isolde", "Saint Patrick and the Druid", "Kevin's Orisons", and "Mamalujo". While these sketches would eventually be incorporated into Finnegans Wake in one form or another, they did not contain any of the main characters or plot points which would later come to constitute the backbone of the book. The first signs of what would eventually become Finnegans Wake came in August 1923 when Joyce wrote the sketch "Here Comes Everybody", which dealt for the first time with the book's protagonist HCE.

Over the next few years, Joyce's method became one of "increasingly obsessional concern with note-taking, since [he] obviously felt that any word he wrote had first to have been recorded in some notebook."

By 1926, Joyce had largely completed both Parts I and III. Geert Lernout asserts that Part I had, at this early stage, "a real focus that had developed out of the HCE ["Here Comes Everybody"] sketch: the story of HCE, of his wife and children. There were the adventures of Humphrey Chimpden Earwicker himself and the rumours about them in chapters 2–4, a description of his wife ALP's letter in chapter 5, a denunciation of his son Shem in chapter 7, and a dialogue about ALP in chapter 8. These texts ... formed a unity." In the same year, Joyce met Maria and Eugène Jolas in Paris, just as his new work was generating an increasingly negative reaction from readers and critics, culminating in The Dial's refusal to publish the four chapters of Part III in September 1926. The Jolases gave Joyce valuable encouragement and material support throughout the long process of writing Finnegans Wake, and published sections of the book in serial form in their literary magazine transition, under the title Work in Progress. For the next few years, Joyce worked rapidly on the book, adding what would become chapters I.1 and I.6, and revising the already written segments to make them more lexically complex.

By this time, some early supporters of Joyce's work, such as Ezra Pound and the author's brother Stanislaus Joyce, had grown increasingly unsympathetic to his new writing. In order to create a more favourable critical climate, a group of Joyce's supporters (including Samuel Beckett, William Carlos Williams, and others) put together a collection of critical essays on the new work. It was published in 1929 under the title Our Exagmination Round His Factification for Incamination of Work in Progress. In July 1929, increasingly demoralised by the poor reception his new work was receiving, Joyce approached his friend James Stephens about the possibility of Stephens completing the book. Joyce wrote to Weaver in late 1929 that he had "explained to [Stephens] all about the book, at least a great deal, and he promised me that if I found it madness to continue, in my condition, and saw no other way out, that he would devote himself, heart and soul, to the completion of it, that is the second part and the epilogue or fourth." Apparently Joyce chose Stephens on superstitious grounds, as he believed he had been born in the same city as Joyce on the same day, 2 February 1882, at six o'clock in the morning, and shared both the first names of Joyce himself and his fictional alter-ego Stephen Dedalus. In the end, Joyce finished the book himself.

In the 1930s, as he was writing Parts II and IV, Joyce's progress slowed considerably. This was due to a number of factors including the death of his father John Stanislaus Joyce in 1931; concern over the mental health of his daughter Lucia; and his own health problems, chiefly his failing eyesight.

Finnegans Wake was published in book form, after seventeen years of composition, on 4 May 1939. Joyce died twenty months later in Zürich, on 13 January 1941.

== Plot ==
Finnegans Wake consists of seventeen chapters, divided into four Parts or Books. Part I contains eight chapters, Parts II and III each contain four, and Part IV consists of only one short chapter. The chapters appear without titles, and while Joyce never provided possible chapter titles as he had done for Ulysses, he did title various sections published separately (see Publication history below). The standard critical practice is to indicate part number in Roman numerals, and chapter title in Arabic numerals, so that III.2, for example, indicates the second chapter of the third part.

Given the book's fluid and changeable approach to plot and characters, a definitive, critically agreed-upon plot synopsis remains elusive. The following synopsis attempts to summarise events in the book, which find general, although inevitably not universal, consensus among critics.

=== Challenges of summary ===
Joyce scholars question the legitimacy of searching for a linear storyline within the complex text of Finnegans Wake. As Bernard Benstock highlights, "in a work where every sentence opens a variety of possible interpretations, any synopsis of a chapter is bound to be incomplete." David Hayman has suggested that "For all the efforts made by critics to establish a plot for the Wake, it makes little sense to force this prose into a narrative mold." The book's challenges have led some commentators into generalised statements about its content and themes, prompting critic Bernard Benstock to warn against the danger of "boiling down" Finnegans Wake into "insipid pap, and leaving the lazy reader with a predigested mess of generalizations and catchphrases." Fritz Senn has also voiced concerns with some plot synopses, saying "we have some traditional summaries, also some put in circulation by Joyce himself. I find them most unsatisfactory and unhelpful, they usually leave out the hard parts and recirculate what we already think we know. I simply cannot believe that FW would be as blandly uninteresting as those summaries suggest."

The challenge of compiling a definitive synopsis of Finnegans Wake lies not only in the opacity of the book's language but also in the radical approach to plot which Joyce employed. Joyce acknowledged this when he wrote to Eugène Jolas that "I might easily have written this story in the traditional manner ... Every novelist knows the recipe ... It is not very difficult to follow a simple, chronological scheme which the critics will understand ... But I, after all, am trying to tell the story of this Chapelizod family in a new way".

While crucial plot points – such as HCE's crime or ALP's letter – are endlessly discussed, the reader never encounters or experiences them firsthand, and as the details are constantly changing, they remain unknown and perhaps unknowable. Joyce himself tacitly acknowledged this radically different approach to language and plot in a 1926 letter to Harriet Weaver, outlining his intentions for the book: "One great part of every human existence is passed in a state which cannot be rendered sensible by the use of wideawake language, cutanddry grammar and goahead plot." Critics have seen a precedent for the book's plot presentation in Laurence Sterne's digressive The Life and Opinions of Tristram Shandy, Gentleman, with Thomas Keymer stating that "Tristram Shandy was a natural touchstone for James Joyce as he explained his attempt "to build many planes of narrative with a single esthetic purpose" in Finnegans Wake".

Despite Joyce's revolutionary techniques, the author repeatedly emphasized that the book was neither random nor meaningless; with Richard Ellmann quoting the author as having stated: "I can justify every line of my book." To Sisley Huddleston he stated "critics who were most appreciative of Ulysses are complaining about my new work. They cannot understand it. Therefore they say it is meaningless. Now if it were meaningless it could be written quickly without thought, without pains, without erudition; but I assure you that these 20 pages now before us [i.e., chapter I.8] cost me twelve hundred hours and an enormous expense of spirit." When the editor of Vanity Fair asked Joyce if the sketches in Work in Progress were consecutive and interrelated, Joyce replied "It is all consecutive and interrelated."

=== Part I ===
In the first chapter of Finnegans Wake Joyce describes the fall of the primordial giant Finnegan and his awakening as the modern family man and pub owner H.C.E.

— Donald Phillip Verene's summary and interpretation of the Wake's episodic opening chapter

The entire work forms a cycle, the book ending with the sentence fragment "a way a lone a last a loved a long the" and beginning by finishing that sentence: "riverrun, past Eve and Adam's, from swerve of shore to bend of bay, brings us by a commodius vicus of recirculation back to Howth Castle and Environs." Joyce himself revealed that the book "ends in the middle of a sentence and begins in the middle of the same sentence." The introductory chapter (I.1) establishes the book's setting as "Howth Castle and Environs" (i.e. the Dublin area), and introduces Dublin hod carrier "Finnegan", who falls to his death from a ladder while constructing a wall. Finnegan's wife Annie puts out his corpse as a meal spread for the mourners at his wake, but he vanishes before they can eat him. A series of episodic vignettes follows, loosely related to the dead Finnegan, most commonly referred to as "The Willingdone Museyroom", "Mutt and Jute", and "The Prankquean". At the chapter's close a fight breaks out, whiskey splashes on Finnegan's corpse, and "the dead Finnegan rises from his coffin bawling for whiskey and his mourners put him back to rest", persuading him that he is better off where he is. The chapter ends with the image of the HCE character sailing into Dublin Bay to take a central role in the story.

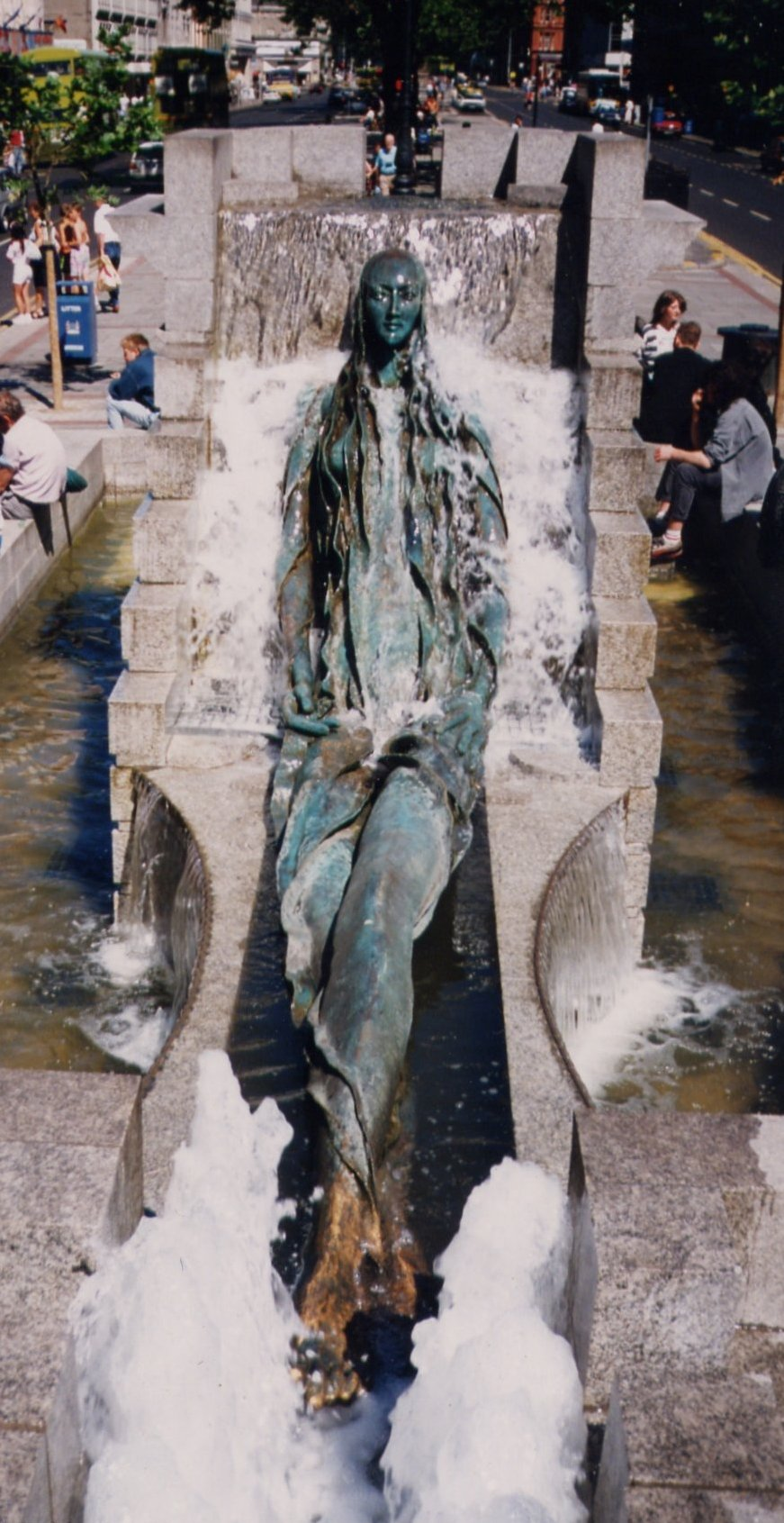
Fountain in Dublin representing Anna Livia Plurabelle, a character in Finnegans Wake

I.2 opens with an account of "Harold or Humphrey" Chimpden receiving the nickname "Earwicker" from the Sailor King, who encounters him attempting to catch earwigs with an inverted flowerpot on a stick while manning a tollgate through which the King is passing. This name helps Chimpden, now known by his initials HCE, to rise to prominence in Dublin society as "Here Comes Everybody". He is then brought low by a rumour that begins to spread across Dublin, apparently concerning a sexual trespass involving two girls in the Phoenix Park, although details of HCE's transgression change with each retelling of events.

Chapters I.2 through I.4 follow the progress of this rumour, starting with HCE's encounter with "a cad with a pipe" in Phoenix Park. The cad greets HCE in Gaelic and asks the time, but HCE misunderstands the question as an accusation, and incriminates himself by denying rumours the cad has not yet heard. These rumours quickly spread across Dublin, gathering momentum until they are turned into a song penned by the character Hosty called "The Ballad of Persse O'Reilly". As a result, HCE goes into hiding, where he is besieged at the closed gate of his pub by a visiting American looking for a drink after hours. HCE remains silent – not responding to the accusations or verbal abuse – dreams, is buried in a coffin at the bottom of Lough Neagh, and is finally brought to trial, under the name Festy King. He is eventually freed, and goes once more into hiding. An important piece of evidence during the trial – a letter about HCE written by his wife ALP – is called for so that it can be examined in closer detail.

ALP's letter becomes the focal point as it is analysed in detail in I.5. This letter was dictated by ALP to her son Shem, a writer, and entrusted to her other son Shaun, a postman, for delivery. The letter never reaches its intended destination, ending up in a midden heap where it is unearthed by a hen named Biddy. Chapter I.6 digresses from the narrative in order to present the main and minor characters in more detail, in the form of twelve riddles and answers. In the eleventh question or riddle, Shaun is asked about his relation to his brother Shem, and as part of his response, tells the parable of the Mookse and the Gripes.

In the final two chapters of Part I, we learn more about the letter's writer Shem the Penman (I.7) and its original author, his mother ALP (I.8). The Shem chapter consists of "Shaun's character assassination of his brother Shem", describing the hermetic artist as a forger and a "sham", before "Shem is protected by his mother [ALP], who appears at the end to come and defend her son." The following chapter concerning Shem's mother, known as "Anna Livia Plurabelle", is interwoven with thousands of river names from all over the globe, and is widely considered the book's most celebrated passage. The chapter was described by Joyce in 1924 as "a chattering dialogue across the river by two washerwomen who as night falls become a tree and a stone." These two washerwomen gossip about ALP's response to the allegations laid against her husband HCE, as they wash clothes in the River Liffey. ALP is said to have written a letter declaring herself tired of her mate. Their gossip then digresses to her youthful affairs and sexual encounters, before returning to the publication of HCE's guilt in the morning newspaper, and his wife's revenge on his enemies: borrowing a "mailsack" from her son Shaun the Post, she delivers presents to her 111 children. At the chapter's close, the washerwomen try to pick up the thread of the story, but their conversation is increasingly difficult as they are on opposite sides of the widening Liffey, and it is getting dark. Finally, as they turn into a tree and a stone, they ask to be told a Tale of Shem or Shaun.

=== Part II ===
While Part I of Finnegans Wake deals mostly with the parents HCE and ALP, Part II shifts that focus to their children, Shem, Shaun and Issy.

II.1 opens with a pantomime programme, which outlines, in relatively clear language, the identities and attributes of the book's main characters. The chapter then concerns a guessing game among the children, in which Shem is challenged three times to guess by "gazework" the colour which the girls have chosen. Unable to answer due to his poor eyesight, Shem goes into exile in disgrace, and Shaun wins the affection of the girls. Finally, HCE emerges from the pub and in a thunder-like voice calls the children inside.

Chapter II.2 follows Shem, Shaun and Issy studying upstairs in the pub, after having been called inside in the previous chapter. The chapter depicts "[Shem] coaching [Shaun] how to do Euclid Bk I, 1", structured as "a reproduction of a schoolboys' (and schoolgirls') old classbook complete with marginalia by the twins, who change sides at half time, and footnotes by the girl (who doesn't)". Once Shem (here called Dolph) has helped Shaun (here called Kev) to draw the Euclid diagram, the latter realises that he has drawn a diagram of ALP's genitalia, and "Kev finally realises the significance of the triangles [..and..] strikes Dolph." After this "Dolph forgives Kev" and the children are given "[e]ssay assignments on 52 famous men." The chapter ends with the children's "nightletter" to HCE and ALP, in which they are "apparently united in a desire to overcome their parents."

Section 1: a radio broadcast of the tale of Pukkelsen (a hunchbacked Norwegian Captain), Kersse (a tailor) and McCann (a ship's husband) in which the story is told inter alia of how HCE met and married ALP.

Sections 2–3: an interruption in which Kate (the cleaning woman) tells HCE that he is wanted upstairs, the door is closed and the tale of Buckley is introduced.

Sections 4–5: the tale, recounted by Butt and Taff (Shem and Shaun) and beamed over the television, of how Buckley shot the Russian General (HCE)

— Danis Rose's overview of the extremely complex chapter 2.3, which he believes takes place in the bar of Earwicker's hotel

II.3 moves to HCE working in the pub below the studying children. As HCE serves his customers, two narratives are broadcast via the bar's radio and television sets, namely "The Norwegian Captain and the Tailor's Daughter", and "How Buckley Shot the Russian General". The first portrays HCE as a Norwegian Captain succumbing to domestication through his marriage to the Tailor's Daughter. The latter, told by Shem and Shaun ciphers Butt and Taff, casts HCE as a Russian general who is shot by Buckley, an Irish soldier in the British Army during the Crimean War. Earwicker has been absent throughout the latter tale, having been summoned upstairs by ALP. He returns and is reviled by his customers, who see Buckley's shooting of the General as symbolic of Shem and Shaun's supplanting their father. This condemnation of his character forces HCE to deliver a general confession of his crimes, including an incestuous desire for young girls. Finally a policeman arrives to send the drunken customers home, the pub is closed up, and the customers disappear singing into the night as a drunken HCE, clearing up the bar and swallowing the dregs of the glasses left behind, morphs into ancient Irish high king Rory O'Connor, and passes out.

II.4, portraying the drunken and sleeping Earwicker's dream, chronicles the spying of four old men (Matthew, Mark, Luke and John) on Tristan and Iseult's journey. The short chapter portrays "an old man like King Mark being rejected and abandoned by young lovers who sail off into a future without him", while the four old men observe Tristan and Isolde, and offer four intertwining commentaries on the lovers and themselves which are "always repeating themselves".

=== Part III ===
Part III concerns itself almost exclusively with Shaun, in his role as postman, having to deliver ALP's letter, which was referred to in Part I but never seen.

III.1 opens with the Four Masters' ass narrating how he thought, as he was "dropping asleep", he had heard and seen an apparition of Shaun the Post. As a result, Shaun re-awakens and, floating down the Liffey in a barrel, is posed fourteen questions concerning the significance and content of the letter he is carrying. Shaun, "apprehensive about being slighted, is on his guard, and the placating narrators never get a straight answer out of him." Shaun's answers focus on his own boastful personality and his admonishment of the letter's author – his artist brother Shem. The answer to the eighth question contains the story of the Ondt and the Gracehoper, another framing of the Shaun-Shem relationship. After the inquisition Shaun loses his balance and the barrel in which he has been floating careens over and he rolls backwards out of the narrator's earshot, before disappearing completely from view.

In III.2 Shaun re-appears as "Jaunty Jaun" and delivers a lengthy and sexually suggestive sermon to his sister Issy, and her twenty-eight schoolmates from St. Brigid's School. Throughout this book Shaun is continually regressing, changing from an old man to an overgrown baby lying on his back, and eventually, in III.3, into a vessel through which the voice of HCE speaks again by means of a spiritual medium. This leads to HCE's defence of his life in the passage "Haveth Childers Everywhere". Part III ends in the bedroom of Mr. and Mrs. Porter as they attempt to copulate while their children, Jerry, Kevin and Isobel Porter, are sleeping upstairs and the dawn is rising outside (III.4). Jerry awakes from a nightmare of a scary father figure, and Mrs. Porter interrupts the coitus to go comfort him with the words "You were dreamend, dear. The pawdrag? The fawthrig? Shoe! Hear are no phanthares in the room at all, avikkeen. No bad bold faathern, dear one." She returns to bed, and the rooster crows at the conclusion of their coitus at the Part's culmination.

=== Part IV ===
1: The waking and resurrection of [HCE]; 2: the sunrise; 3: the conflict of night and day; 4: the attempt to ascertain the correct time; 5: the terminal point of the regressive time and the [Shaun] figure of Part III; 6: the victory of day over night; 7: the letter and monologue of [ALP]

— Roland McHugh's summary of the events of Part IV

Part IV consists of only one chapter, which, like the book's opening chapter, is mostly composed of a series of seemingly unrelated vignettes. After an opening call for dawn to break, the remainder of the chapter consists of the vignettes "Saint Kevin", "Berkely and Patrick" and "The Revered Letter". ALP is given the final word, as the book closes on a version of her Letter and her final long monologue, in which she tries to wake her sleeping husband, declaring "Rise up, man of the hooths, you have slept so long!", and remembers a walk they once took, and hopes for its re-occurrence. At the close of her monologue, ALP – as the river Liffey – disappears at dawn into the ocean. The book's last words are a fragment, but they can be turned into a complete sentence by attaching them to the words that start the book:

A way a lone a last a loved a long the / riverrun, past Eve and Adam's, from swerve of shore to bend of bay, brings us by a commodius vicus of recirculation back to Howth Castle and Environs.

== Characters ==
Critics disagree on whether discernible characters exist in Finnegans Wake. For example, Grace Eckley argues that Wakean characters are distinct from one another, and defends this with explaining the dual narrators, the "us" of the first paragraph, as well as Shem-Shaun distinctions while Margot Norris argues that the "[c]haracters are fluid and interchangeable". Supporting the latter stance, Van Hulle finds that the "characters" in Finnegans Wake are rather "archetypes or character amalgams, taking different shapes", and Riquelme similarly refers to the book's cast of mutable characters as "protean". As early as in 1934, in response to the recently published excerpt "The Mookse and the Gripes", Ronald Symond argued that "the characters in Work in Progress, in keeping with the space-time chaos in which they live, change identity at will. At one time they are persons, at another rivers or stones or trees, at another personifications of an idea, at another they are lost and hidden in the actual texture of the prose, with an ingenuity far surpassing that of crossword puzzles." Such concealment of character identity has resulted in some disparity as to how critics identify the book's main protagonists; for example, while most find consensus that Festy King, who appears on trial in I.4, is a HCE type, not all analysts agree on this – for example Anthony Burgess believes him to be Shaun.

While characters are in a constant state of flux—constantly changing names, occupations, and physical attributes—a recurring set of core characters, or character types (what Norris dubs "ciphers"), are discernible. During the composition of Finnegans Wake, Joyce used signs, or so-called "sigla", rather than names to designate these character amalgams or types. In a letter to his Maecenas, Harriet Shaw Weaver (March 1924), Joyce made a list of these sigla. For those who argue for the existence of distinguishable characters, the book focuses on the Earwicker family, which consists of father, mother, twin sons and a daughter.

=== Humphrey Chimpden Earwicker (HCE) ===
Philip Kitcher argues for the father HCE as the book's protagonist, stating that he is "the dominant figure throughout ... His guilt, his shortcomings, his failures pervade the entire book". Bishop states that while the constant flux of HCE's character and attributes may lead us to consider him as an "anyman," he argues that "the sheer density of certain repeated details and concerns allows us to know that he is a particular, real Dubliner." The common critical consensus of HCE's fixed character is summarised by Bishop as being "an older Protestant male, of Scandinavian lineage, connected with the pubkeeping business somewhere in the neighbourhood of Chapelizod, who has a wife, a daughter, and two sons."

HCE is referred to by literally thousands of names throughout the book; leading Terence Killeen to argue that in Finnegans Wake "naming is ... a fluid and provisional process". HCE is at first referred to as "Harold or Humphrey Chimpden"; a conflation of these names as "Haromphreyld", and as a consequence of his initials "Here Comes Everybody". These initials lend themselves to phrase after phrase throughout the book; for example, appearing in the book's opening sentence as "Howth Castle and Environs". As the work progresses the names by which he may be referred to become increasingly abstract (such as "Finn MacCool", "Mr. Makeall Gone", or "Mr. Porter").

Some Wake critics, such as Finn Fordham, argue that HCE's initials come from the initials of the portly politician Hugh Childers (1827–96), who had been nicknamed "Here Comes Everybody" for his size.

Many critics see Finnegan, whose death, wake and resurrection are the subject of the opening chapter, as either a prototype of HCE, or as another of his manifestations. One of the reasons for this close identification is that Finnegan is called a "man of hod, cement and edifices" and "like Haroun Childeric Eggeberth", identifying him with the initials HCE. Patrick Parrinder for example states that "Bygmester Finnegan ... is HCE", and finds that his fall and resurrection foreshadows "the fall of HCE early in Book I [which is] paralleled by his resurrection towards the end of III.3, in the section originally called "Haveth Childers Everywhere", when [HCE's] ghost speaks forth in the middle of a seance."

=== Anna Livia Plurabelle (ALP) ===
Patrick McCarthy describes HCE's wife ALP as "the river-woman whose presence is implied in the 'riverrun' with which Finnegans Wake opens and whose monologue closes the book. For over six hundred pages, Joyce presents Anna Livia to us almost exclusively through other characters, much as in Ulysses we hear what Molly Bloom has to say about herself only in the last chapter." The most extensive discussion of ALP comes in chapter I.8, in which hundreds of names of rivers are woven into the tale of ALP's life, as told by two gossiping washerwomen. Similarly hundreds of city names are woven into "Haveth Childers Everywhere", the corresponding passage at the end of III.3 which focuses on HCE. As a result, it is generally contended that HCE personifies the city of Dublin, and his wife ALP personifies the river Liffey, on whose banks the city was built.

=== Shem, Shaun and Issy ===
ALP and HCE have a daughter, Issy – whose personality is often split (represented by her mirror-twin). Parrinder argues that "as daughter and sister, she is an object of secret and repressed desire both to her father ... and to her two brothers." These twin sons of HCE and ALP consist of a writer called Shem the Penman and a postman by the name of Shaun the Post, who are rivals for replacing their father and for their sister Issy's affection. Shaun is portrayed as a dull postman, conforming to society's expectations, while Shem is a bright artist and sinister experimenter, often perceived as Joyce's alter-ego in the book. Hugh Staples finds that Shaun "wants to be thought of as a man-about-town, a snappy dresser, a glutton and a gourmet ... He is possessed of a musical voice and is a braggart. He is not happy in his work, which is that of a messenger or a postman; he would rather be a priest." Shaun's sudden and somewhat unexpected promotion to the book's central character in Part III is explained by Tindall with the assertion that "having disposed of old HCE, Shaun is becoming the new HCE."

Like their father, Shem and Shaun are referred to by different names throughout the book, such as "Caddy and Primas"; "Mercius" and "Justius"; "Dolph and Kevin"; and "Jerry and Kevin". These twins are contrasted in the book by allusions to sets of opposing twins and enemies in literature, mythology and history; such as Set and Horus of the Osiris myth; the biblical pairs Jacob and Esau, Cain and Abel, and Saint Michael and the Devil – equating Shaun with "Mick" and Shem with "Nick" – as well as Romulus and Remus. They also represent the oppositions of time and space, and tree and stone.

=== Minor characters ===
The most commonly recurring characters outside of the Earwicker family are the four old men known collectively as "Mamalujo" (a conflation of their names: Matt Gregory, Marcus Lyons, Luke Tarpey and Johnny Mac Dougall). These four most commonly serve as narrators, but they also play a number of active roles in the text, such as when they serve as the judges in the court case of I.4, or as the inquisitors who question Yawn in III.4. Tindall summarises the roles that these old men play as those of the Four Masters, the Four Evangelists, and the four Provinces of Ireland ("Matthew, from the north, is Ulster; Mark, from the south, is Munster; Luke, from the east, is Leinster; and John, from the west, is Connaught"). According to Finn Fordham, Joyce related to his daughter-in-law Helen Fleischmann that "Mamalujo" also represented Joyce's own family, namely his wife Nora (mama), daughter Lucia (lu), and son Giorgio (jo).

In addition to the four old men, there are a group of twelve unnamed men who always appear together, and serve as the customers in Earwicker's pub, gossipers about his sins, jurors at his trial and mourners at his wake. The Earwicker household also includes two cleaning staff: Kate, the maid, and Joe, who is by turns handyman and barman in Earwicker's pub. Tindall considers these characters to be older versions of ALP and HCE. Kate often plays the role of museum curator, as in the "Willingdone Museyroom" episode of 1.1, and is recognisable by her repeated motif "Tip! Tip!" Joe is often also referred to by the name "Sackerson", and Kitcher describes him as "a figure sometimes playing the role of policeman, sometimes ... a squalid derelict, and most frequently the odd-job man of HCE's inn, Kate's male counterpart, who can ambiguously indicate an older version of HCE."

== Major themes ==
Fargnoli and Gillespie suggest that the book's opening chapter "introduces [the] major themes and concerns of the book", and enumerate these as "Finnegan's fall, the promise of his resurrection, the cyclical structure of time and history (dissolution and renewal), tragic love as embodied in the story of Tristan and Iseult, the motif of the warring brothers, the personification of the landscape and the question of Earwicker's crime in the park, the precise nature of which is left uncertain throughout the Wake." Such a view finds general critical consensus, viewing the vignettes as allegorical appropriations of the book's characters and themes; for example, Schwartz argues that "The Willingdone Museyroom" episode represents the book's "archetypal family drama in military-historical terms." Joyce himself referred to the chapter as a "prelude", and as an "air photograph of Irish history, a celebration of the dim past of Dublin." Riquelme finds that "passages near the book's beginning and its ending echo and complement one another", and Fargnoli and Gillespie representatively argue that the book's cyclical structure echoes the themes inherent within, that "the typologies of human experience that Joyce identifies [in Finnegans Wake] are ... essentially cyclical, that is, patterned and recurrent; in particular, the experiences of birth, guilt, judgment, sexuality, family, social ritual and death recur throughout the Wake". In a similar enumeration of themes, Tindall argues that "rise and fall and rise again, sleeping and waking, death and resurrection, sin and redemption, conflict and appeasement, and, above all, time itself ... are the matter of Joyce's essay on man."

Henkes and Bindervoet generally summarise the critical consensus when they argue that, between the thematically indicative opening and closing chapters, the book concerns "two big questions" which are never resolved: what is the nature of protagonist HCE's secret sin, and what was the letter, written by his wife ALP, about? HCE's unidentifiable sin has most generally been interpreted as representing man's original sin as a result of the Fall of Man. Anthony Burgess sees HCE, through his dream, trying "to make the whole of history swallow up his guilt for him" and to this end "HCE has, so deep in his sleep, sunk to a level of dreaming in which he has become a collective being rehearsing the collective guilt of man." Fargnoli and Gillespie argue that although undefined, "Earwicker's alleged crime in the Park" appears to have been of a "voyeuristic, sexual, or scatological nature". ALP's letter appears a number of times throughout the book, in a number of different forms, and as its contents cannot be definitively delineated, it is usually believed to be both an exoneration of HCE, and an indictment of his sin. Herring argues that "[t]he effect of ALP's letter is precisely the opposite of her intent ... the more ALP defends her husband in her letter, the more scandal attaches to him." Patrick A. McCarthy argues that "it is appropriate that the waters of the Liffey, representing Anna Livia, are washing away the evidence of Earwicker's sins as [the washerwomen speak, in chapter I.8] for (they tell us) she takes on her husband's guilt and redeems him; alternately she is tainted with his crimes and regarded as an accomplice".

== Style ==
=== Language ===
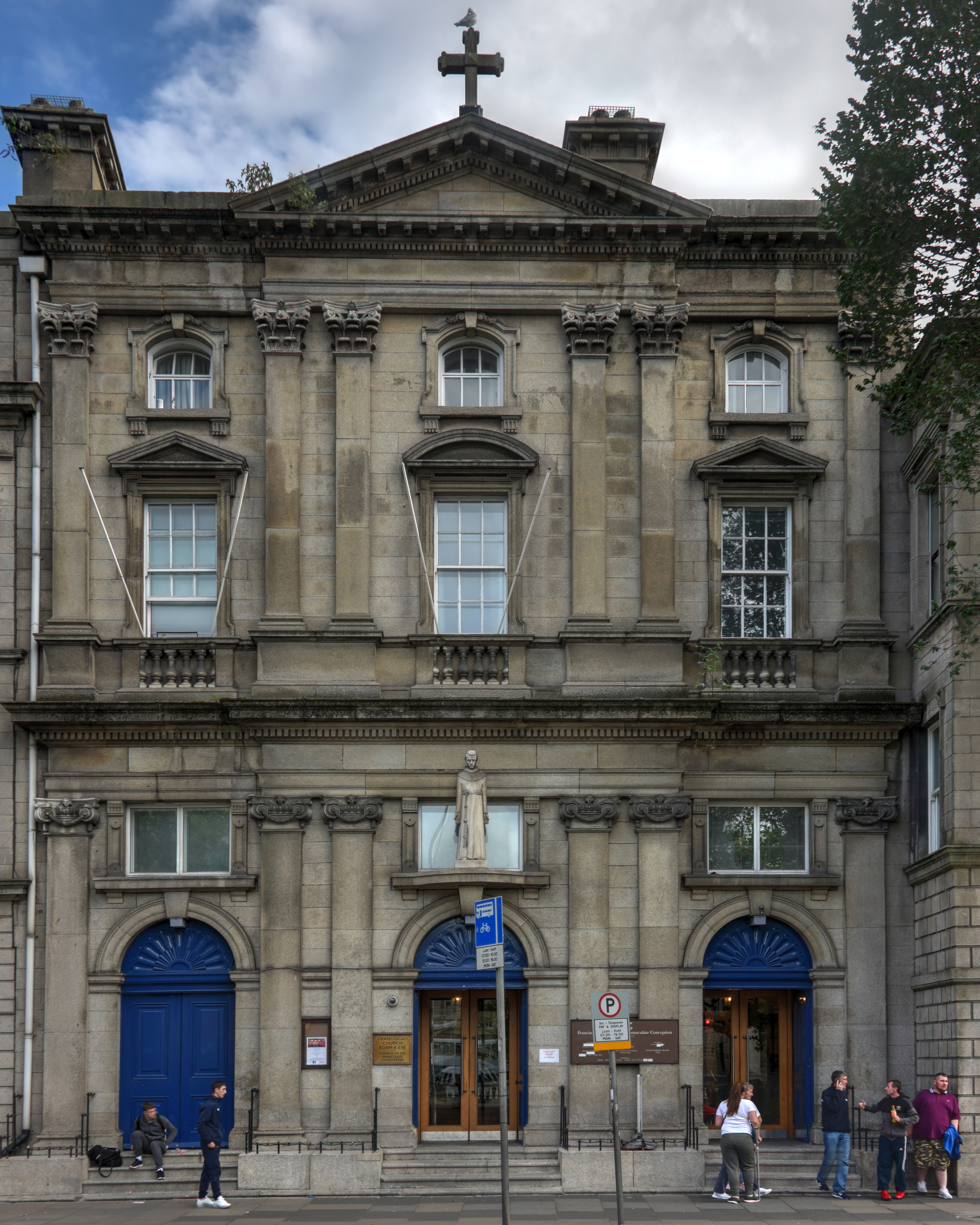
The Franciscan Church of the Immaculate Conception in Dublin, popularly known as Adam & Eve's, referred to in the opening of Finnegans Wake

Joyce invented a unique polyglot-language or idioglossia solely for the purpose of this work. This language is composed of composite words from some sixty to seventy world languages, combined to form puns, or portmanteau words and phrases intended to convey several layers of meaning at once. Senn has labelled Finnegans Wake's language as "polysemetic", and Tindall as an "Arabesque". Norris describes it as a language which "like poetry, uses words and images which can mean several, often contradictory, things at once". The style has also been compared to rumour and gossip, especially in the way the writing subverts notions of political and scholarly authority. An early review of the book argued that Joyce was attempting "to employ language as a new medium, breaking down all grammatical usages, all time space values, all ordinary conceptions of context ... the theme is the language and the language the theme, and a language where every association of sound and free association is exploited." Seconding this analysis of the book's emphasis on form over content, Paul Rosenfeld reviewed Finnegans Wake in 1939 with the suggestion that "the writing is not so much about something as it is that something itself [...] in Finnegans Wake the style, the essential qualities and movement of the words, their rhythmic and melodic sequences, and the emotional color of the page are the main representatives of the author's thought and feeling. The accepted significations of the words are secondary."

While commentators emphasize how this manner of writing can communicate multiple levels of meaning simultaneously, Hayman and Norris contend that its purpose is as much to obscure and disable meaning as to expand it. Hayman writes that access to the work's "tenuous narratives" may be achieved only through "the dense weave of a language designed as much to shield as to reveal them." Norris argues that Joyce's language is "devious" and that it "conceals and reveals secrets." Allen B. Ruch has dubbed Joyce's new language "dreamspeak," and describes it as "a language that's basically English, but extremely malleable and all-inclusive, a fusion of portmanteau words, stylistic parodies, and complex puns." Although much has been made of the numerous world languages employed in the book's composite language, most of the more obscure languages appear only seldom in small clusters, and most agree with Ruch that the latent sense of the language, however manifestly obscure, is "basically English". Burrell also finds that Joyce's thousands of neologisms are "based on the same etymological principles as standard English." The Wake's language is not entirely unique in literature; for example critics have seen its use of portmanteaus and neologisms as an extension of Lewis Carroll's Jabberwocky.

Although Joyce died shortly after the publication of Finnegans Wake, during the work's composition the author made a number of statements concerning his intentions in writing in such an original manner. In a letter to Max Eastman, for example, Joyce suggested that his decision to employ such a unique and complex language was a direct result from his attempts to represent the night:

In writing of the night I really could not, I felt I could not, use words in their ordinary connections. Used that way they do not express how things are in the night, in the different stages – the conscious, then semi-conscious, then unconscious. I found that it could not be done with words in their ordinary relations and connections. When morning comes of course everything will be clear again ... I'll give them back their English language. I'm not destroying it for good.

Joyce is also reported as having told Arthur Power that "what is clear and concise can't deal with reality, for to be real is to be surrounded by mystery." On the subject of the vast number of puns employed in the work Joyce argued to Frank Budgen that "after all, the Holy Roman Catholic Apostolic Church was built on a pun. It ought to be good enough for me", and to the objection of triviality he replied "Yes. Some of the means I use are trivial – and some are quadrivial." A great many of the book's puns are etymological in nature. Sources tell us that Joyce relished delving into the history and the changing meanings of words, his primary source being An Etymological Dictionary of the English Language by the Rev. Walter W. Skeat (Oxford, at the Clarendon Press; 1879). For example, one of the first entries in Skeat is for the letter A, which begins: "... (1) adown; (2) afoot; (3) along; (4) arise; (5) achieve; (6) avert; (7) amend; (8) alas; (9) abyss ..." Further in the entry, Skeat writes: "These prefixes are discussed at greater length under the headings Of, On, Along, Arise ... Alas, Aware, Avast ..." It seems likely that these strings of words prompted Joyce to finish the Wake with a sentence fragment that included the words: "... a way a lone a last a loved a long ..."

Samuel Beckett collected words from foreign languages on cards for Joyce to use, and, as Joyce's eyesight worsened, wrote down the text from his dictation. Beckett described and defended the writing style of Finnegans Wake thus: "This writing that you find so obscure is a quintessential extraction of language and painting and gesture, with all the inevitable clarity of the old inarticulation. Here is the savage economy of hieroglyphics".

Faced with the obstacles to be surmounted in "understanding" Joyce's text, a handful of critics have suggested readers focus on the rhythm and sound of the language, rather than solely on "meaning." For instance, as early as 1929, Eugène Jolas stressed the importance of the aural and musical dimensions of the work.

=== A reconstruction of nocturnal life ===
Throughout the book's seventeen-year gestation, Joyce stated that with Finnegans Wake he was attempting to "reconstruct the nocturnal life", and that the book was his "experiment in interpreting 'the dark night of the soul'." According to Ellmann, Joyce stated to Edmond Jaloux that Finnegans Wake would be written "to suit the esthetic of the dream, where the forms prolong and multiply themselves", and once informed a friend that "he conceived of his book as the dream of old Finn, lying in death beside the river Liffey and watching the history of Ireland and the world – past and future – flow through his mind like flotsam on the river of life." While pondering the generally negative reactions to the book Joyce said:

I can't understand some of my critics, like Pound or Miss Weaver, for instance. They say it's obscure. They compare it, of course, with Ulysses. But the action of Ulysses was chiefly during the daytime, and the action of my new work takes place chiefly at night. It's natural things should not be so clear at night, isn't it now?

Joyce's claims to be representing the night and dreams have been accepted and questioned with greater and lesser credulity. Harriet Weaver was among the first to suggest that the dream was not that of any one dreamer, but was rather an analysis of the process of dreaming itself. Bernard Benstock also argued that "The Dreamer in the Wake is more than just a single individual, even if one assumes that on the literal level we are viewing the dream of publican H. C. Earwicker."

Supporters of the claim have pointed to Part IV as providing its strongest evidence, as when the narrator asks "You mean to see we have been hadding a sound night's sleep?", and later concludes that what has gone before has been "a long, very long, a dark, very dark ... scarce endurable ... night". Tindall refers to Part IV as "a chapter of resurrection and waking up", and McHugh finds that the chapter contains "particular awareness of events going on offstage, connected with the arrival of dawn and the waking process which terminates the sleeping process of [Finnegans Wake]."

This conceptualisation of the Wake as a dream is a point of contention for some. Harry Burrell, a representative of this view, argues that "one of the most overworked ideas is that Finnegans Wake is about a dream. It is not, and there is no dreamer." Burrell argues that the theory is an easy way out for "critics stymied by the difficulty of comprehending the novel and the search for some kind of understanding of it."

Other critics have been skeptical of the effort to specifically identify the dreamer of the book's narrative. According to Clive Hart, "Speculation about the 'real person' behind the guises of the dream-surrogates or about the function of the dream in relation to the unresolved stresses of this hypothetical mind is fruitless, for the tensions and psychological problems in Finnegans Wake concern the dream-figures living within the book itself."

=== Allusions ===
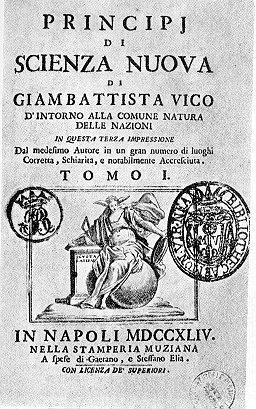
Giambattista Vico's "La Scienza Nuova" (The New Science), an influence on the structure of Finnegans Wake

Finnegans Wake incorporates a high number of intertextual allusions and references to other texts; Parrinder refers to it as "a remarkable example of intertextuality" containing a "wealth of literary reference." Among the most prominent are the Irish ballad "Finnegan's Wake" from which the book takes its name, Italian philosopher Giovanni Battista Vico's La Scienza Nuova, the Egyptian Book of the Dead, the plays of Shakespeare, and religious texts such as the Bible and Qur'an. These allusions, rather than directly quoting or referencing a source, normally enter the text in a contorted fashion, often through humorous plays on words. For example, Hamlet Prince of Denmark becomes "Camelot, prince of dinmurk" and the Epistle to the Hebrews becomes a "farced epistol to the hibruws".

"Commodius vicus" refers to Giambattista Vico (1668–1744), who proposed a theory of cyclical history in his work La Scienza Nuova (The New Science). Vico argued that the world was coming to the end of the last of three ages, these being the age of gods, the age of heroes, and the age of humans. These ideas recur throughout Finnegans Wake, informing the book's four-part structure. Vico's name appears a number of times throughout the Wake, indicating the work's debt to his theories, such as "The Vico road goes round and round to meet where terms begin". That a reference to Vico's cyclical theory of history is to be found in the opening sentence which is a continuation of the book's closing sentence – thus making the work cyclical in itself – creates the relevance of such an allusion.

One of the sources Joyce drew from is the Ancient Egyptian story of Osiris, and the Egyptian Book of the Dead, a collection of spells and invocations. Bishop asserts that "it is impossible to overlook the vital presence of the Book of the Dead in Finnegans Wake, which refers to ancient Egypt in countless tags and allusions." Joyce uses the Book of the Dead in Finnegans Wake, "because it is a collection of the incantations for the resurrection and rebirth of the dead on the burial". At one of their final meetings, Joyce suggested to Frank Budgen that he write an article about Finnegans Wake, entitling it "James Joyce's Book of the Dead". Budgen followed Joyce's advice with his paper "Joyce's Chapters of Going Forth by Day", highlighting many of the allusions to Egyptian mythology in the book.

The Tristan and Iseult legend – a tragic love triangle between the Irish princess Iseult, the Cornish knight Tristan and his uncle King Mark – is also oft alluded to in the work, particularly in II.4. Fargnoli and Gillespie argue that "various themes and motifs throughout Finnegans Wake, such as the cuckoldry of Humphrey Chimpden Earwicker (a King Mark figure) and Shaun's attempts at seducing Issy, relate directly to Tristan and Isolde ... other motifs relating to Earwicker's loss of authority, such as the forces usurping his parental status, are also based on Tristan and Isolde."

The book also alludes heavily to Irish mythology, with HCE sometimes corresponding to Fionn mac Cumhaill, Finnegans Wake also makes a great number of allusions to religious texts. When HCE is first introduced in chapter I.2, the narrator relates how "in the beginning" he was a "grand old gardener", thus equating him with Adam in the Garden of Eden. Spinks further highlights this allusion by highlighting that like HCE's unspecified crime in the park, Adam also "commits a crime in a garden".

== Reception ==
The value of Finnegans Wake as a work of literature has been a point of contention since the time of its appearance, in serial form, in literary reviews of the 1920s. Initial response, to both its serialised and final published forms, was almost universally negative. Even close friends and family were disapproving of Joyce's seemingly impenetrable text, with Joyce's brother Stanislaus "rebuk[ing] him for writing an incomprehensible night-book", and former friend Oliver Gogarty believing the book to be a joke, pulled by Joyce on the literary community, referring to it as "the most colossal leg pull in literature since Macpherson's Ossian". When Ezra Pound, a former champion of Joyce's and admirer of Joyce's Ulysses, was asked his opinion on the text, he wrote "Nothing so far as I make out, nothing short of divine vision or a new cure for the clap can possibly be worth all the circumambient peripherization." H. G. Wells, in a personal letter to Joyce, argued that "you have turned your back on common men, on their elementary needs and their restricted time and intelligence ... I ask: who the hell is this Joyce who demands so many waking hours of the few thousands I have still to live for a proper appreciation of his quirks and fancies and flashes of rendering?" Even Joyce's patron Harriett Weaver wrote to him in 1927 to inform him of her misgivings regarding his new work, stating "I am made in such a way that I do not care much for the output from your Wholesale Safety Pun Factory nor for the darknesses and unintelligibilities of your deliberately entangled language system. It seems to me you are wasting your genius."

The wider literary community was equally disparaging, with D. H. Lawrence declaring in a letter to Maria and Aldous Huxley, having read sections of the Wake appearing as "Work in Progress" in transition, "My God, what a clumsy olla putrida James Joyce is! Nothing but old fags and cabbage-stumps of quotations from the Bible and the rest, stewed in the juice of deliberate journalistic dirty-mindedness – what old and hard-worked staleness, masquerading as the all-new!" Vladimir Nabokov, who had also admired Ulysses, described Finnegans Wake as "nothing but a formless and dull mass of phony folklore, a cold pudding of a book, a persistent snore in the next room ... and only the infrequent snatches of heavenly intonations redeem it from utter insipidity." In response to such criticisms, transition published essays throughout the late 1920s, defending and explaining Joyce's work. In 1929, these essays (along with a few others written for the occasion) were collected under the title Our Exagmination Round His Factification for Incamination of Work in Progress and published by Shakespeare and Company. This collection featured Samuel Beckett's first commissioned work, the essay "Dante ... Bruno. Vico.. Joyce", along with contributions by William Carlos Williams, Stuart Gilbert, Marcel Brion, Eugene Jolas and others. As Margot Norris highlights, the agenda of this first generation of Wake critics and defenders was "to assimilate Joyce's experimental text to an already increasingly established and institutionalized literary avant-garde" and "to foreground Joyce's last work as spearhead of a philosophical avant-garde bent on the revolution of language".

Upon its publication in 1939, Finnegans Wake received a series of mixed, but mostly negative reviews. Louise Bogan, writing for Nation, surmised that while "the book's great beauties, its wonderful passages of wit, its variety, its mark of genius and immense learning are undeniable ..., to read the book over a long period of time gives one the impression of watching intemperance become addiction, become debauch" and argued that "Joyce's delight in reducing man's learning, passion, and religion to a hash is also disturbing." Edwin Muir, reviewing in Listener wrote that "as a whole the book is so elusive that there is no judging it; I cannot tell whether it is winding into deeper and deeper worlds of meaning or lapsing into meaningless", although he too acknowledged that "there are occasional flashes of a kind of poetry which is difficult to define but is of unquestioned power." B. Ifor Evans, writing in the Manchester Guardian, similarly argued that, due to its difficulties, the book "does not admit of review", and argued that, perhaps "in twenty years' time, with sufficient study and with the aid of the commentary that will doubtless arise, one might be ready for an attempt to appraise it." Taking a swipe at many of the negative reviews circulating at the time, Evans writes: "The easiest way to deal with the book would be ... to write off Mr. Joyce's latest volume as the work of a charlatan. But the author of Dubliners, A Portrait of the Artist and Ulysses is not a charlatan, but an artist of very considerable proportions. I prefer to suspend judgement ..."

In the time since Joyce's death, the book's admirers have struggled against public perception of the work to make exactly this argument for Finnegans Wake. One of the book's early champions was Thornton Wilder, who wrote to Gertrude Stein and Alice Toklas in August 1939, a few months after the book's publication: "One of my absorptions ... has been James Joyce's new novel, digging out its buried keys and resolving that unbroken chain of erudite puzzles and finally coming on lots of wit, and lots of beautiful things has been my midnight recuperation. A lot of thanks to him". The publication in 1944 of the first in-depth study and analysis of Joyce's final text—A Skeleton Key to Finnegans Wake by mythologist Joseph Campbell and Henry Morton Robinson—tried to prove to a skeptical public that if the hidden key or "Monomyth" could be found, then the book could be read as a novel with characters, plot, and an internal coherence. As a result, from the 1940s to the 1960s critical emphasis moved away from positioning the Wake as a "revolution of the word" and towards readings that stressed its "internal logical coherence", as "the avant-gardism of Finnegans Wake was put on hold [and] deferred while the text was rerouted through the formalistic requirements of an American criticism inspired by New Critical dicta that demanded a poetic intelligibility, a formal logic, of texts." Slowly the book's critical capital began to rise to the point that, in 1957, Northrop Frye described Finnegans Wake as the "chief ironic epic of our time" and Anthony Burgess lauded the book as "a great comic vision, one of the few books of the world that can make us laugh aloud on nearly every page."

In 1962, Clive Hart wrote the first major book-length study of the work since Campbell's Skeleton Key, Structure and Motif in "Finnegans Wake" which approached the work from the increasingly influential field of structuralism. However through the 1960s it was to be French post-structuralist theory that was to exert the most influence over readings of Finnegans Wake, refocussing critical attention back to the work's radical linguistic experiments and their philosophical consequences. Jacques Derrida compared his ideas of literary "deconstruction" with the methods of Finnegans Wake (as detailed in the essay "Two Words for Joyce"), and more generally post-structuralism has embraced Joyce's innovation and ambition in Finnegans Wake.

In 1965, Umberto Eco wrote another book-length study of the work called Le poetiche di Joyce: Dalla "Summa" al "Finnegans Wake", in which he spends much time analyzing the topology and layers of metaphors in the book, concluding that "every word of the book becomes the main issue that introduces every other word, a sort of topological maze in which everything is both the deep 'inside' and the peripheral 'outside'."

More recently, Finnegans Wake has become an increasingly accepted part of the critical literary canon, although detractors still remain. As an example, John Bishop described the book's legacy as that of "the single most intentionally crafted literary artifact that our culture has produced ... and, certainly, one of the great monuments of twentieth-century experimental letters." The section of the book to have received the most praise throughout its critical history has been "Anna Livia Plurabelle" (I.8), which Parrinder describes as being "widely recognized as one of the most beautiful prose-poems in English."

== Publication and translation history ==
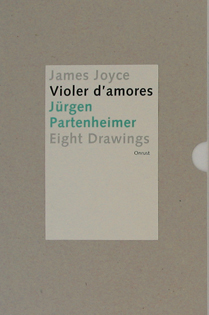
Jürgen Partenheimer's "Violer d'amores", a series of drawings inspired by Joyce's Finnegans Wake

Throughout the seventeen years that Joyce wrote the book, Finnegans Wake was published in short excerpts in a number of literary magazines, most prominently in the Parisian literary journals Transatlantic Review and Eugene Jolas's transition. It has been argued that "Finnegans Wake, much more so than Ulysses, was very much directly shaped by the tangled history of its serial publication." In late October 1923 in Ezra Pound's Paris flat, Ford Madox Ford convinced Joyce to contribute some of his new sketches to the Transatlantic Review, a new journal that Ford was editing.

The eight-page "Mamalujo" sketch became the first fragment from the book to be published in its own right, in Transatlantic Review 1.4 in April 1924. The sketch appeared under the title "From Work in Progress", a term applied to works by Ernest Hemingway and Tristan Tzara published in the same issue, and the one by which Joyce would refer to his final work until its publication as Finnegans Wake in 1939. The sketch appeared in the final published text, in radically altered form, as chapter 2.4.

In 1925 four sketches from the developing work were published. "Here Comes Everybody" was published as "From Work in Progress" in the Contact Collection of Contemporary Writers, edited by Robert McAlmon. "The Letter" was published as "Fragment of an Unpublished Work" in Criterion 3.12 (July 1925), and as "A New Unnamed Work" in Two Worlds 1.1. (September 1925). The first published draft of "Anna Livia Plurabelle" appeared in Le Navire d'Argent 1 in October, and the first published draft of "Shem the Penman" appeared in the Autumn–Winter edition of This Quarter.

In 1925-6 Two Worlds began to publish redrafted versions of previously published fragments, starting with "Here Comes Everybody" in December 1925, and then "Anna Livia Plurabelle" (March 1926), "Shem the Penman" (June 1926), and "Mamalujo" (September 1925), all under the title "A New Unnamed Work".

Eugene Jolas befriended Joyce in 1927, and as a result serially published revised fragments from Part I in his transition literary journal. This began with the debut of the book's opening chapter, under the title "Opening Pages of a Work in Progress", in April 1927. By November chapters I.2 through I.8 had all been published in the journal, in their correct sequence, under the title "Continuation of a Work in Progress". From 1928 Part's II and III slowly began to emerge in transition, with a brief excerpt of II.2 ("The Triangle") published in February 1928, and Part III's four chapters between March 1928 and November 1929.

At this point, Joyce started publishing individual chapters from Work in Progress. In 1929, Harry and Caresse Crosby, owners of the Black Sun Press, contacted Joyce through bookstore owner Sylvia Beach and arranged to print three short fables about the novel's three children Shem, Shaun and Issy that had already appeared in translation. These were "The Mookse and the Gripes", "The Triangle", and "The Ondt and the Gracehoper". The Black Sun Press named the new book Tales Told of Shem and Shaun for which they paid Joyce US$2,000 for 600 copies, unusually good pay for Joyce at that time.

The book was finally published simultaneously by Faber and Faber in London and by Viking Press in New York on 4 May 1939, after seventeen years of composition.

In March 2010, a new edition was published by Houyhnhnm Press in conjunction with Penguin. Editors Danis Rose and John O'Hanlon claim to make 9,000 minor "yet crucial" corrections and amendments to what they title The Restored Finnegans Wake. American scholar Tim Conley, however, laments that "The process of the editing remains concealed. Readers are repeatedly told of how much hard and honorable work has gone into the restoration, but the work itself is kept out of view and thus away from judgment." He praises the 2012 Oxford edition edited by Robbert-Jan Henkes, Erik Bindervoet, and Finn Fordham for its more scholarly editorial apparatus. By turns skeptical and appreciative, he begins and concludes his review essay celebrating the existence of these new textual options.

Despite its linguistic complexity, Finnegans Wake has been translated into French, German, Greek, Japanese, Korean, Polish, Russian, Serbian, Spanish (by M. Zabaloy), Dutch, Portuguese, Latin, Turkish, Swedish (by B. Falk), Chinese, Italian, and Georgian.

== Dramatic and musical adaptions ==
A musical play, The Coach with the Six Insides by Jean Erdman, based on the character Anna Livia Plurabelle, was performed in New York in 1962. Parts of the book were adapted for the stage by Mary Manning as Passages from Finnegans Wake (1965), which in turn was adapted for film by Mary Ellen Bute.

Olwen Fouéré's solo performance play riverrun, based on the theme of rivers in Finnegans Wake, has received critical accolades around the world. Adam Harvey has also adapted Finnegans Wake for the stage. Martin Pearlman's three-act Finnegan's Grand Operoar is for speakers with an instrumental ensemble. A version adapted by Barbara Vann with music by Chris McGlumphy was produced by The Medicine Show Theater in April 2005.

John Cage's The Wonderful Widow of Eighteen Springs became the first musical setting of words from Finnegans Wake, approved by the Joyce Estate in 1942. He used text taken from page 558. Roaratorio: an Irish circus on Finnegans Wake (1979) combines a collage of sounds mentioned in Finnegans Wake - including farts, guns and thunderclaps - with Irish jigs and Cage reading his text Writing for the Second Time through Finnegans Wake. Cage also set Nowth upon Nacht to music in 1984.

In 1947 Samuel Barber set an excerpt from Finnegans Wake as the song Nuvoletta for soprano and piano. Barber also composed a piece for orchestra entitled Fadograph of a Yestern Scene, the title a quote from the first part of the novel. It was first performed at the Heinz Hall in Pittsburgh by the Pittsburgh Symphony Orchestra under William Steinberg in September 1971.

Luciano Berio set much to Joyce, and was an admirer of Finnegans Wake, but only one of his pieces, A-Ronne (1975) directly refers to it (heard in the vocal fragment "run", derived from "riverrun"). Influenced by Berio, British composer Roger Marsh set selected passages concerned with the character Anna Livia Plurabelle in his 1977 Not a soul but ourselves for amplified voices using extended vocal techniques. Marsh went on to direct the unabridged (29 hour) audiobook of Finnegans Wake issued by Naxos in 2021.

The Japanese composer Toru Takemitsu used several quotes from the novel in his music: its first word for his composition for piano and orchestra, riverrun (1984). His 1980 composition for violin and orchestra is called Far calls. Coming, far! taken from the last page of Finnegans Wake. Similarly, he entitled his 1981 string quartet A Way a Lone, taken from the last sentence of the work.

André Hodeir composed the jazz cantata Anna Livia Plurabelle (1966). Scottish group The Wake's second album is called Here Comes Everybody (1985). Phil Minton set passages of the Wake to music, on his 1998 album Mouthfull of Ecstasy. In 2011 German band Tangerine Dream released the instrumental album Finnegans Wake, inspired by the novel. In 2015 Waywords and Meansigns: Recreating Finnegans Wake [in its whole wholume] set Finnegans Wake to music unabridged, featuring an international group of musicians and Joyce enthusiasts.

In 2000, Danish visual artists Michael Kvium and Christian Lemmerz created a multimedia project called "the Wake", an eight-hour-long silent movie based on the book. Between 2014–2016 in Poland, many adaptations of Finnegans Wake saw completion, including publication of the text as a musical score, a short film Finnegans Wake//Finneganów tren, a multimedia adaptation First We Feel Then We Fall and K. Bartnicki's intersemiotic translations into sound and verbovisual. In October 2020, Austrian illustrator Nicolas Mahler presented a small-format (ISO A6) 24-page comic adaptation of Finnegans Wake with reference to comic figures Mutt and Jeff.
