= Marcel Brion =

French writer

- Born: 21 November 1895; Marseille, France
- Died: 23 October 1984 (aged 88); Paris, France
- Occupations: Essayist, literary critic, novelist, and historian

Marcel Brion (French: [bʁi.ɔ̃]; 21 November 1895 – 23 October 1984) was a French essayist, literary critic, novelist, and historian.

== Early life ==
The son of a lawyer, Brion was classmates in Thiers with Marcel Pagnol and Albert Cohen. After completing his secondary education in Collège Champittet, Switzerland, he studied law at the University of Aix-en-Provence.

== Career ==
Counsel to the bar of Marseille between 1920 and 1924, he abandoned his legal career to turn to literature.

Brion wrote nearly a hundred books in his career, ranging from historical biography to examinations of Italian and German art, and turning later in life to novels. His most famous collection of stories is the 1942 Les Escales de la Haute Nuit ("The Shore Leaves of the Deepest Night"). An essay of Brion appears in Our Exagmination Round His Factification for Incamination of Work in Progress, the important 1929 critical appreciation of James Joyce's Finnegans Wake.

He was a friend of the philosopher Xavier Tilliette.

In 1964, Brion was elected to the Académie française's chair 33, replacing his friend Jean-Louis Vaudoyer. Other distinctions include membership in the Legion of Honour, the Croix de guerre, a Grand Officer in the French Order of Merit, and an Officer of the Ordre des Arts et des Lettres.

The 1982 television program The Romantic Spirit, which aired in the U.S. on the A&E (TV channel) from 1985–1991, credits Brion as having "devised" the series.

== French language publications ==
=== Arts and literature ===
- Giotto, Rieder, 1928
- Turner, Rieder, 1929
- Botticelli, Crès, 1932
- Klee, Somogy, 1955
- Kandinsky, Somogy, 1960
- L'Œuvre de Balzac, 16 volumes, Classiques-CFL, 1950-1953
- Fabrizio Clerici, Milan, Electra Editrice, 1955
- L'Allemagne romantique, 4 vol., Albin Michel :
  - Vol. I - Kleist, Brentano, Wackenroder, Tieck, Caroline von Günderode, 1962
  - Vol. II - Novalis, Hoffmann, Jean-Paul, Eichendorff, 1963
  - Vol. III - Le Voyage initiatique - 1, 1977; ISBN 978-2-226-00403-1. Table : Le Voyage initiatique, Thème; Variations; Pressentiment et Présence de Joseph von Eichendorff; La Loge invisible de Jean-Paul; Les Voyages de Franz Sternbald de Ludwig Tieck; Heinrich von Ofterdingen de Novalis; Le Voyage en Orient de Hermann Hesse
  - Vol. IV - Le Voyage initiatique - 2, 1978
- Venise, Albin Michel 1962
- L'Art romantique, Hachette, 1963
- L'Âge d'or de la peinture hollandaise, Elsevier, 1964
- L'Œil, l'esprit et la main du peintre, Plon, 1966
- Peinture romantique, Albin Michel, 1967
- La Grande Aventure de la peinture religieuse, Perrin, 1968
- Rembrandt, Albin Michel, 1969
- Titien, Somogy, 1971
- Guardi, Henri Scrépel, 1976
- Goethe, Albin Michel, 1982
- Robert Schumann et l'âme romantique, Albin Michel, 1954
- Paul Cézanne, Bordas, 1988
- Art fantastique, Albin Michel 1989
- Michel-Ange, Albin Michel, 1995
- Léonard de Vinci, Albin Michel, 1995
- Mozart, Perrin, 2006
- Le Théâtre des esprits, préface d'Agnès Brion et note liminaire de Patrick Brion, La tour verte, 2011

=== Biographies ===
- Bartolomé de Las Casas, Père des Indiens, Plon, 1928
- La Vie d'Attila, Gallimard, 1928
- Rudyard Kipling, Éditions de la Nouvelle Revue critique, 1929
- Théodoric, roi des Ostrogoths, Payot, 1935; 1979
- La reine Jeanne, Société des bibliophiles de Provence, 1936; 1944 (Robert Laffont)
- Laurent le Magnifique, Albin Michel, 1937
- Blanche de Castille, Les éditions de France, 1939
- Machiavel, Albin Michel, 1948
- Frédéric II de Hohenstaufen, Tallandier, 1948
- Le Pape et le Prince - Les Borgia, Hachette, 1953
- Tamerlan, Albin Michel, 1999
- Charles le Téméraire, grand-duc d'Occident, Hachette, 1947. Réédition : Tallandier, 2006, compte rendu en ligne.
- Les Amantes courts essais sur Diotima - Alcoforado - Frédérique Brion - Charlotte Stieglitz et Louise Labé, Albin Michel, 1941

=== History ===
- Les Mondes antiques, Arthème Fayard, 1954; Tallandier, 1977. 9 volumes : L'Égypte (1 et 2), L'Orient (3), Les Hébreux (4), La Grèce (5 et 6), Rome (7 à 9)

=== Novels ===
- Le Caprice espagnol (Gallimard nrf, 1929)
- La Folie Céladon (Éditions Correa, 1935, Albin Michel 1963, et livre de Poche, 1989)
- Les Escales de la haute nuit, nouvelles, (Laffont, 1942, réédite bibliothèque Marabout, 1971, puis Albin Michel, 1986)
- Un enfant de la terre et du ciel (Albin Michel, 1943)
- Château d'ombre (Luf, 1943, puis Albin Michel, 1960)
- L’Enchanteur (Luf, 1947)
- La Chanson de l'Oiseau étranger (Albin Michel, 1958)
- La Ville de sable, (Albin Michel, 1959)
- La Rose de cire (Albin Michel, 1964)
- De l'autre côté de la forêt (Albin Michel, 1966)
- Les Miroirs et les gouffres (Albin Michel, 1968)
- L’Ombre d’un arbre mort (Albin Michel, 1970)
- Nous avons traversé la montagne (Albin Michel, 1972)
- La Fête de la tour des âmes (Albin Michel, 1974)
- Algues - fragment d'un journal intime (Albin Michel, 1976)
- Les Vaines Montagnes (Albin Michel, 1985)
- Le Journal d’un visiteur (Albin Michel, 1980)
- Villa des hasards (Albin Michel, 1984)
- Ivre d’un rêve héroïque et brutal (de Fallois, 2014)

== English language publications ==
- Pompeii & Herculaneum: The glory and the grief.
- Albrecht Dürer, 'The World of Art Library' series
- Romantic Art (Thames and Hudson, 1960)
- Waystations of the Deep Night (Wakefield Press, 2020).
