= The Romantic Spirit =

The Romantic Spirit is a 1982 British documentary television series in 14 episodes about the Romantic movement in Western culture. The series is an Anglo-French-German production presented by R.M. Productions (Film & Television) Ltd. and FR3, devised by Marcel Brion of the Académie Française, with the executive producers being Michèle Arnaud and Theodore Salata.

The English-language version, by Landseer Film & Television Productions, London, is written by Carla Heffner, adapted for television by Judy Marle, with the production supervisor being Terri Winders, and introduced and narrated by Anthony Andrews, from the house of John Keats, Hampstead, London.

Individual episodes of the series cover sundry Romantic themes and topics.

The series was broadcast in North America on the A&E Network from 1985 until 1991.

== Episode Titles ==
1. "The Romantic Explosion" [Directed by Jean-Louis Fournier] - Anthony Andrews profiles writers and painters of the 18th- and 19th-century Romantic Movement.

2. "Blood, Sea & Sand" [Directed by Michel Pamart] - The paintings of Delacroix, Turner and Goya illustrate Romanticism in nature.

3. "Paradise Lost" [Directed by Jean-Louis Fournier] - Poems by Wordsworth and Goethe illustrate the theme of wild, pure nature as freedom.

4. "The Romantic Hero" [Directed by Michel Pamart] - The ideals of poets Byron and Chateaubriand reflect the Romantic concept of poet as hero.

5. "The Romantic Journey" [Directed by Bernard Guillon] - An examination of Goethe's 'Faust,' including readings, illustrates the Romantic view of life as a voyage of discovery.

6. "Battle of the Stage" [Directed by Jean-Louis Fournier] - Plays of Schiller and Kleist depict the Romantic philosophy of the hero as a renegade.

7. "Night" [Directed by Daniel Lander] - Dreams influence the Romantic artists.

8. "Triumph of Death" [Directed by Jean-Louis Fournier] - The 'art' of death influences Romantic writers.

9. "The Golden Age" [Directed by Hans S. Lampe] - Works by Blake and Keats illustrate the Romantic yearning for a return to a free and peaceful 'Golden Age.'

10. "Music of the Soul" [Directed by Patrick Meunier]- The music of Beethoven, Schubert, Schumann, and Liszt expresses the deeper emotions.

11. "Romantic Women" [Directed by Jochen Richter] - Female writers participate in the Romantic movement, including Mary Shelley (author of Frankenstein), Karoline von Günderrode, the sisters Brontë, and George Sand.

12. "Victor Hugo & The Romantic Century" [Directed by Yvon Gerault] - Poet, novelist and playwright Victor Hugo personifies the Romantic era.

13. "The Triumph of Romanticism?" [Directed by Daniel Lander] - The Romantic movement in Paris pits intellectuals against aristocracy.

14. "The Romantic Heritage" [Directed by Jean-Louis Fournier] - Romanticism of the 19th century influences the 20th.
