= Elliot Paul =

American journalist and author

- Born: February 10, 1891; Malden, Massachusetts
- Died: April 7, 1958 (aged 67); Providence, Rhode Island
- Occupation: Writer
- Spouses: Rosa Gertrude Brown (m. 1919; div. 1925) Camille Haynes (m. 1925; div. 1937) Flora Thompson (m. 1937; div. 1940) Barbara Mayock (m. 1940; div. 1949) Nancy Dolan McMahon (m. 1950; div. 1957)
- Writing career
- Period: 20th century
- Genres: fiction, history, screenwriting

Elliot Harold Paul (February 10, 1891 – April 7, 1958) was an American journalist and writer.

== Biography ==
Paul was born in Linden, a part of Malden, Massachusetts, the son of Harold Henry Paul and Lucy Greenleaf Doucette. He graduated from Malden High School then worked in the U.S. West on the government Reclamation projects for several years until 1914 when he returned home and took a job as a reporter covering legislative events at the State House in Boston. In 1917, he joined the U.S. Army Signals Corps to fight in World War I. Paul served in France where he fought in the Battle of Saint-Mihiel and in the Meuse-Argonne offensive. Following the war's end, he returned home and to a job as a journalist. At this time, he began writing books, inspired in part by his military experiences.

By 1925 Elliot Paul had already seen three of his novels published when he left America to join many of his literary compatriots in the Montparnasse Quarter of Paris, France. There, he worked for a time at the Chicago Tribune's International Edition (so-called Paris Edition), before joining Eugene and Maria Jolas as co-editor of the literary journal, transition. A friend of both James Joyce and Gertrude Stein, Paul defied Ernest Hemingway's maxim that "if you mentioned Joyce twice to Stein, you were dead." Paul was a great enthusiast of Stein's work, equating its "feeling for a continuous present" with jazz.

Paul returned to the newspaper business, to the Paris Herald and to write more novels in his spare time. He had completed three more books when he suffered from a nervous breakdown and abruptly left Paris to recuperate in the Spanish village of Santa Eulalia on the island of Ibiza. With virtually no one in the literary community knowing where he was, in her 1933 The Autobiography of Alice B. Toklas, Stein mused over his "disappearance."

Caught in the middle of the Spanish Civil War, he was inspired to write the well-received Life and Death of a Spanish Town. Forced to flee Spain, he returned to Paris and produced detective fiction featuring the amateur sleuth Homer Evans, as well as crafting what is considered as one of his best works, The Last Time I Saw Paris.

Back in the United States following the outbreak of World War II, Elliot Paul turned to screenwriting where in Hollywood, between 1941 and 1953, he participated in the writing of ten screenplays, the most remembered of which is the 1945 production, Rhapsody in Blue; he also wrote the screenplay for the Poverty Row production of New Orleans, a fictional history of Storyville jazz featuring Billie Holiday in her only acting role. He also contributed to London Town (1946), one of the most infamous flops in British cinema history. In 1949 he provided subtitles for the US release of Claude Autant-Lara's film Devil in the Flesh (Le Diable au corps).

Contemptuous of the censorship imposed on the studios by the Hays Code, Paul mocked Hollywood's hypocritical puritanism in his satiric book from 1942, With a Hays Nonny Nonny, where he reworked Bible stories so that they complied with the Code. The Book of Esther, for example, becomes a vehicle for Don Ameche, with Groucho Marx as Mordecai.

A talented pianist, he frequently supplemented his income by playing at local clubs in the Los Angeles area.

Paul married and divorced five times - Rosa Gertrude Brown (1919–1925), Camille Haynes (1925–1937), Flora Thompson (1937–1940), Barbara Mayock (1940–1949), and Nancy Dolan McMahon (1950–1957). He had one son with Camille Haynes. He had one son with Barbara Mayock. He died in 1958 at the Veterans' Hospital in Providence, Rhode Island.

== Partial list of screenwriting credits ==
- A Woman's Face (1941)
- Rhapsody in Blue (1945)
- It's a Pleasure (1945)
- London Town (1946) (U.S. title My Heart Goes Crazy)
- New Orleans (1947)

== Bibliography ==
=== Novels ===
- Indelible (novel)|Indelible (1922)
- Impromptu (1923)
- Imperturbe (1924)
- Low Run Tide and Lava Rock (1929)
- The Amazon (novel)|The Amazon (1930)
- The Governor of Massachusetts (1930)
- Concert Pitch (1938)
- The Stars and Stripes Forever (book)|The Stars and Stripes Forever (1939)
- The Death of Lord Haw Haw (as Brett Rutledge, 1940)
- A Narrow Street (British title of The Last Time I Saw Paris) (1942)
- Paris: Twenty-Eight Drawings by Jean Vigoureux (introduction; 1942)
- Summer in December (1945)
- Linden on the Saugus Branch (1946)
- A Ghost Town on the Yellowstone (1948)
- My Old Kentucky Home (book)|My Old Kentucky Home (1949)
- Desperate Scenery (1954)

Homer Evans series

- The Mysterious Mickey Finn (1939)
- Hugger Mugger in the Louvre (1940)
- Mayhem in B-Flat (1940)
- Fracas in the Foothills (1940)
- I'll Hate Myself in the Morning (1945)
- Murder on the Left Bank (1951)
- The Black Gardenia (1952)
- Waylaid in Boston (1953)
- The Black and the Red (1956)

=== Non-fiction ===
- Life and Death of a Spanish Town (1937)
- Intoxication Made Easy (1941)
- The Last Time I Saw Paris (1942) (Note: Not to be confused with the film The Last Time I Saw Paris, which was based on the short story Babylon Revisited by F. Scott Fitzgerald.)
- Springtime in Paris (1950)
- Paul, Elliot (1953). "Gertrude, alas, alas". In Birmingham, Frederic A. (ed.). The girls from Esquire. London: Arthur Barker. pp. 176–184.
- Understanding the French (1954/55)
- Film Flam (1956)
- That Crazy American Music (1957)

———————
