= Marie Monnier =

French illustrator and embroiderer

- Born: 1894; Paris, France
- Died: 1976 (aged 81–82); Paris, France
- Spouse: Paul-Emile Bécat
- Relatives: Adrienne Monnier (sister)

Marie Monnier (1894 - 1976) was a French illustrator and embroiderer, known for her elaborate and vibrant compositions in needle and thread. Her work met with critical esteem during the 1920s, when she exhibited actively, but it has since been largely forgotten.

== Life ==
Monnier was born in Paris, during the final decade of the nineteenth century, to parents Clovis and Philiberte (née Sollier). Monnier was married to painter and printmaker Paul-Emile Bécat. Her elder sister, Adrienne Monnier, was the proprietor of the famous Parisian bookstore, La Maison des Amis des Livres.

== Work and critical reception ==
Marie Monnier exhibited her embroideries in Paris at La Maison des Amis des Livres and Galerie E. Druet during the 1920s to the acclaim of critics and writers including Paul Valéry and Léon-Paul Fargue. She contributed illustrations to editions of Fargue's collection Ludions (1930) as well as Paul Valéry's Moralités (1931). Valéry's essay “Les Broderies de Marie Monnier” opened the catalog for her 1924 exhibition at Galerie E. Druet (then managed by Eugene Druet's widow), which included her illustrations for his “L’Abeille and “Palme,” Arthur Rimbaud’s “Les Chercheuses de poux,” and Fargue's “Féerie.” In that essay, Valéry described her work thus:

Look at the marvelous coloring of these panels. They have a brilliance akin to life's rosiest products–insects' wings, birds' feathers, shells, petals. No painting can match the force or delicacy that appears in these subtle associations of bits of dyed silk. Stitch after stealthy stitch adds up to the texture of sumptuousness. Even flesh tints are ravishingly reproduced, and the incalculable artfulness of a needle comes to delightful fruition in the modeling of a shoulder or a breast.

In this last sentence, Valéry seems to be describing Monnier's L’Abeille, based on his own poem of the same title; that embroidery now resides in the Bureau Valéry collection at the Bibliothèque Littéraire Jacques-Doucet. Monnier also made a large embroidery inspired by James Joyce’s Finnegans Wake. That novel appeared as the serial “Work in Progress” in the little magazine transition, which published a reproduction of Monnier's embroidery Birth in issue number four (July 1927). The work appears in the context of a section of Modernist art reproductions including paintings by Cubist Juan Gris and Surrealist Kristians Tonny. Transition’s editors included a biographical note esteeming Monnier: "To call the work of MARIE MONNIER ‘embroidery’ is inadequate and unjust. Her compositions are magnificently organized but, because of her unique medium, she is able to use colors and textures which are denied a painter in oils and watercolors.” They added that her current exhibition at La Maison des Amis des Livres had “astonished art lovers of Paris,” and that her patient sensibility in her craft stood as a “deliberate artistic undercurrent beneath the apparent restlessness and confusion of the age. In his essay “Broderies,” published in La Nouvelle Revue Française in June 1927, Fargue similarly praised Monnier's art at length. Describing his encounter with her embroideries on exhibit La Maison des Amis des Livres, he wrote,

There was a singular vibration, a lucigène [related to a type of oil lamp] state (first aspect of the sun across flowers, leaves, the work of insects). No pigment heaviness. Bright Colors. Woven windows. I thought of [Johannes] Volkelt’s words: color is a movement particular to the ether. . . . The idea of time, of forest, of light and of seasons, presides over these embroideries, which have not cheated, which have not betrayed. Some of them took Madame Monnier two years of work. They have decorated, adorned themselves, like gardens, like branches, they sprout as they need, like a good seed.

Following this praise, he suggests that these works are destined for a prominence that they little received: “Let's look at them closely while they are still free. Let's spend their final moments with them, unhindered, before they go to do their military service in collections and for sale [in galleries], with a lot of mutations, permissions, blackmail and paradoxical speculations, to retire, one day, in museums.”

== Exhibitions ==
Broderies de Marie Monnier, Galerie E. Druet, Paris, France, May 5–30, 1924

Exposition Marie Monnier: travaux de 1923-1927: broderies, aquarelles, gravures. La Maison des Amis des Livres, Paris France, May 16 – June 15, 1927.

Marie Monnier: ou, Le fil à broder nos rêves: Donation de M. Maurice Saillet. Musée départemental de l'Oise, Beauvais, France, October 21, 1992 –January 17, 1993.
