= Georges Duthuit =

Georges Duthuit (1891–1973) was a French writer, art critic and historian. Duthuit was the editor for the new iteration of the literary journal transition, titled Transition, from 1948-1950.

Duthuit was a key commentator on Matisse (his father-in-law), Nicolas de Staël, Jean-Paul Riopelle, and Bram van Velde. He maintained a close association with the surrealists, particularly André Masson. In 1939, he was among the intellectuals convened for George Bataille's College of Sociology. Part of his correspondences on contemporary art with Samuel Beckett form the text Three Dialogues, originally published in Transition 49.

In 1923 he married Marguerite Matisse (1894-1982), daughter of Henri Matisse. They had one son, Claude (born 1931).

== Sources ==
- George Duthuit on Dumbarton Oaks website
- Georges Duthuit on Dictionary of Art Historians website
