= Raymonde Delaunois =

Belgian opera singer

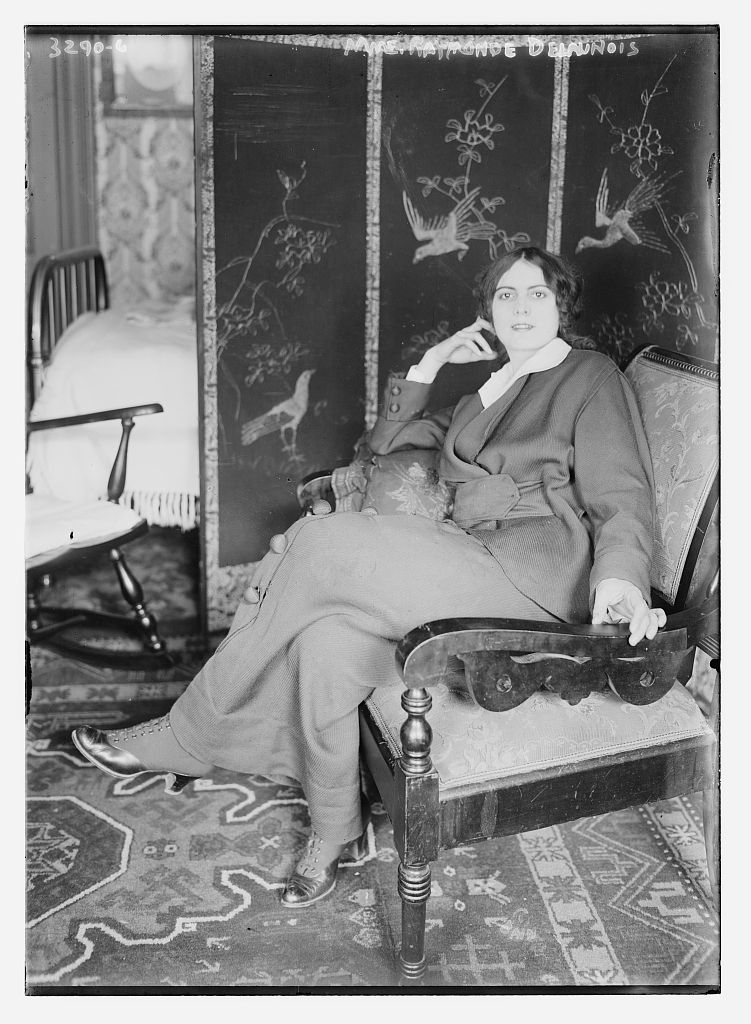
- Delaunois circa 1915 in New York City
- Born: 12 October 1885; Brussels, Belgium
- Died: 30 June 1984 (aged 98); Corbeil-Essonnes, France
- Occupation: singer
- Spouse: Louis Thomas (1909)

Raymonde Delaunois (12 October 1885 – 30 June 1984) was a Belgian mezzo-soprano opera singer.

== Biography ==
She was born in Paris (10th arrondissement) on 12 October 1885 to a single mother. Raymonde was raised in Frameries near Mons in Belgium. One day she sang on a school event and was encouraged to follow further training. She took courses at the Conservatoire in Mons and later in Brussels.

On 14 August 1909 she married writer Louis Thomas. Settling in Paris, the young couple became involved with the inner circle around Claude Debussy. Louis Thomas organised exclusive concerts where Raymonde sang, accompanied by pianist Ennemond Trillat. They did much to promote Debussy.

Soon Raymonde Delaunois performed also outside Paris. She was the first to sing the Songs of Bilitis in Brussels. She also made tours in Continental Europe. In Prague and Budapest she sang in opera houses, performing the leading roles in Mignon and Carmen.

Raymonde Delaunois never achieved the status of 'opera diva’ and remained within the range of appreciated actresses, without reaching the top position. The female stars in her time were, at the Met, Geraldine Farrar (1882–1967) and Rosa Ponselle (1897–1981).

At the end of 1926, her contract with the Met ended after twelve seasons, 32 roles and 315 performances. Delaunois returned to France, and appeared in title roles of operas like Carmen, Mignon and La fille de Madame Angot (Alexandre Charles Lecocq).

She sang for the last time in public in 1943. She continued to teach voice and piano.

Having always lived in Paris, she moved to a pensioners house in Corbeil-Essonnes, a suburb of Paris, in 1982 where she died two years later, on 30 June 1984.

== At the Metropolitan Opera in New York ==
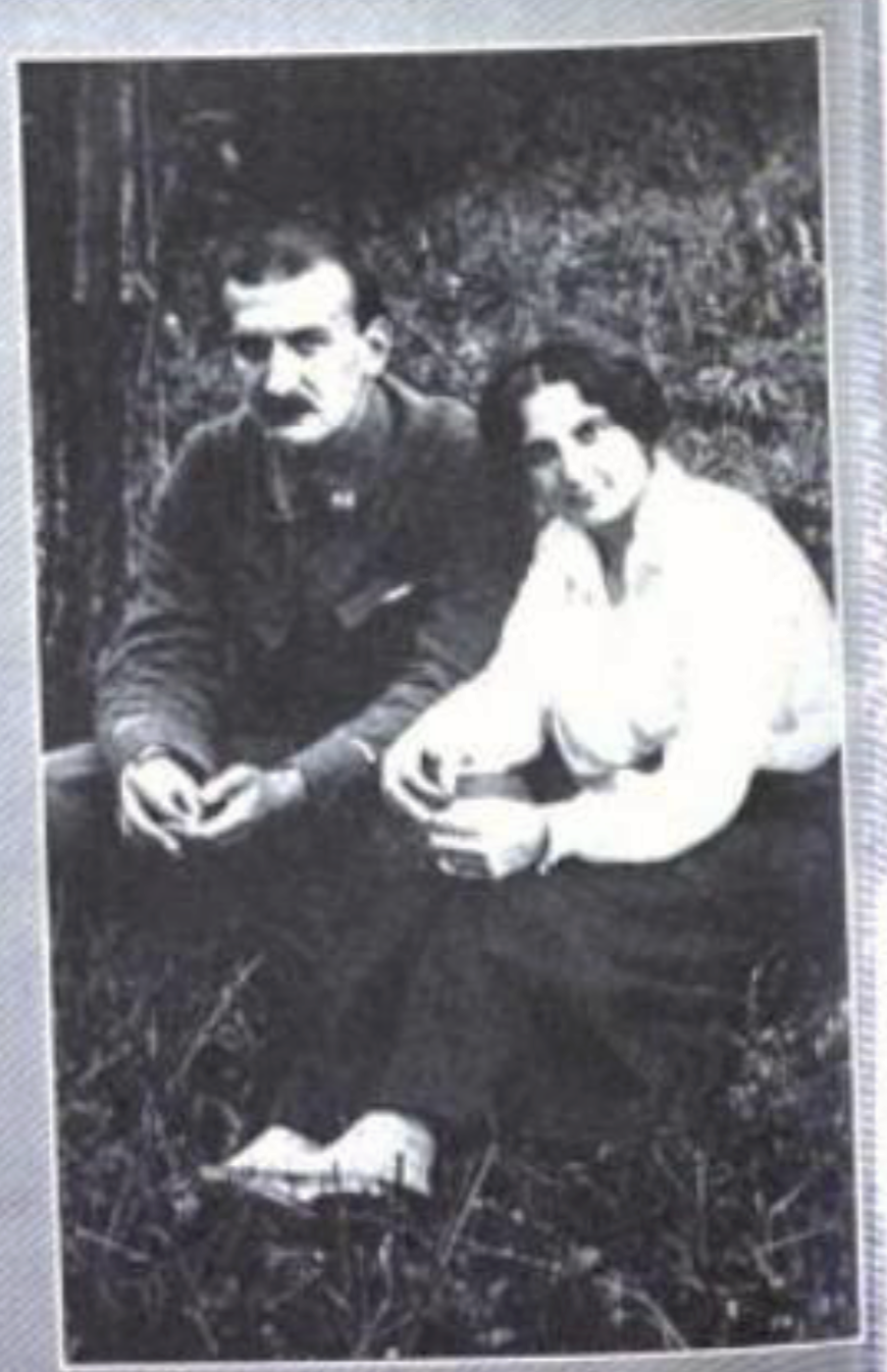
Raymonde Delaunois with her husband, the writer Louis Thomas.

In 1914, despite the War, Raymonde signed a contract with the Metropolitan Opera New York City, where she found a European atmosphere, with Giulio Gatti-Casazza (1869–1940), former director of La Scala, Arturo Toscanini (1867–1957) as conductor, Enrico Caruso (1873–1921) and Feodor Chaliapin (1873–1938), after them Beniamino Gigli (1890–1957) as the prominent male stars.

The mezzo-soprano Delaunois started with small parts:

- Siegrune in Die Walküre,
- a Geisha in Iris by Mascagni,
- a Flower-maiden in Parsifal,
- Puck in Oberon by Weber,
- Myrtale and also Crobyle in Thaïs by Massenet (directed by Pierre Monteux).

Followed more important roles:

- Musetta in La bohème,
- Lola in Cavalleria rusticana,
- Cherubino in The Marriage of Figaro,
- Siebel in Faust,
- Stephanie in Roméo et Juliette by Gounod (with Beniamino Gigli in the main role),
- Mallika in Lakmé by Léo Delibes,
- Preziosilla in La forza del destino by Verdi (Caruso was the star)
- Féodor in Boris Godunov by Moussorgsky (with Chaliapin).
- Irma in Louise by Gustave Charpentier

She sang leading roles in several Met creations:

- Don Ella in Francesca da Rimini by Riccardo Zandonai (1916),
- Tyltyl in L'oiseau bleu (The Blue Bird) by Albert Wolff, based upon work by Maurice Maeterlinck (1919),
- Annette in The Polish Jew by Karel Weis (1862–1944) (1921),
- Juliet in Die tote Stadt by Erich Korngold, based upon Bruges-la-Morte by Georges Rodenbach (1922),
- Lehl in The Snow Maiden by Rimsky-Korsakov (1922)
- Kaled in Le roi de Lahore by Jules Massenet (1924)
