= Three Dialogues =

1949 book by Georges Duthuit

Originally published in Transition 49 in 1949, Three Dialogues represents a small part (fewer than 3000 words) of a correspondence between Samuel Beckett and Georges Duthuit about the nature of contemporary art, with particular reference to the work of Pierre Tal-Coat, André Masson and Bram van Velde. It might more accurately be said that beneath these surface references may be found an invaluable commentary on Beckett's own struggle with expression at a particularly creative and pivotal period of his life. A frequently quoted example is the following recommendation, ostensibly for what Tal-Coat's work should strive towards: "The expression that there is nothing to express, nothing with which to express, nothing from which to express, no power to express, no desire to express, together with the obligation to express."

A great strength of these dialogues is the wit of both participants, combined with Duthuit's persistent and intelligent challenges to Beckett's pessimism, as in his reply to the above recommendation: "But that is a violently extreme and personal point of view, of no help to us in the matter of Tal-Coat." Beckett's only answer to that is, appropriately enough, silence.

Roughly, the scheme of the dialogues is as follows. Beckett is critical first of Tal-Coat and then of Masson (both of whom Duthuit defends and admires) for continuing the failures of the traditional art which they claim to challenge or reject. By way of contrast, he holds up the work of his friend Bram van Velde, although Duthuit appears exasperated (or mock-exasperated) that Beckett's commentary seems continually to refer back to his own preoccupations: "Try and bear in mind that the subject under discussion is not yourself..."

Other revealing comments made by Beckett in the dialogues include: "I speak of an art turning from [the plane of the feasible] in disgust, weary of its puny exploits, weary of pretending to be able, of being able, of doing a little better the same old thing, of going a little further along a dreary road." He also speaks of his "dream of an art unresentful of its insuperable indigence and too proud for the farce of giving and receiving."

Despite the unrelenting pessimism of Beckett's arguments, these dialogues are charged with a self-deprecating good humour that help to throw light on the fundamental paradox of seeking (and finding) brilliantly expressive ways to express that nothing meaningful can ever be expressed. At the end of the first dialogue, Beckett's silence is met with Duthuit's rejoinder that "perhaps that is enough for today"; at the end of the second, Beckett "exits weeping" when Duthuit asks, "Are we really to deplore the painting that is rallying, among all the things of time that pass and hurry us away, towards a time that endures and gives increase?"; the third ends with Beckett remembering warmly that, "I am mistaken, I am mistaken."
