= André Ruyters =

Belgian novelist, banker and poet

André Ruyters (1876–1952), surname also as Ruijters in line with Dutch orthography, or Ruÿters, was a Belgian novelist and poet writing in French, and banker. In France during the 1890s and the first decade of the 20th century he was a figure of the literary world, and close friend and correspondent of André Gide. He was one of the founding group of the Nouvelle Revue Française. His French translation of Joseph Conrad's Heart of Darkness, published from 1924 in the Revue des Deux Mondes, was influential from the point of view of Francophone reception of Conrad.

== Life ==
Ruyters came across Gide around 1895, and helped him publish in Belgian journals, such as Coq rouge and L'Ermitage. He was also linked by Gide to La Revue Blanche. After they had corresponded for a year or so, Ruyters visited Gide in December 1897. Ruyters has been considered a disciple, influenced by dépaysement, and also Friedrich Nietzsche and his conception of "immoralism". The prose style adopted by Ruyters has been seen as strongly influenced by Les nourritures terrestres of 1897 by Gide.

On 4 August 1897, Ruyters married Georgina Lyon. Their daughter Luce was born in Brussels in 1898.

Antée was a Belgian little magazine published 1906–1908. It was produced by Ruyters with Christian Beck and Henri Vanderputte. Gide was an ally, and it is considered a precursor of the Nouvelle Revue Française (NRF). The latter was founded, with a false start in 1908, by Gide and Ruyters, Marcel Drouin and Henri Ghéon also close to Gide, with Jacques Copeau and Jean Schlumberger.

At the NRF, Ruyters took on the position of managing director. He was involved in the decision late in 1912 by the NRF reading committee not to publish Du côté de chez Swann by Marcel Proust, supporting Gide's negative reaction with a comment on its "bad writing".

== Works ==
Ruyters was active as a writer 1895 to 1914, beginning with a slim volume of verse, Douze petits nocturnes (1895). He sent it to Gide. Deboile, who sees the writings of Ruyters as coming in the wake of Gide's, suggests that the idea of the communication came from the Belgian writer and critic Maurice Belval (1862–1917), known as Henry Maubel.

- Les oiseaux dans la cage (1896), novel
- A eux Deux (1897)
- Jardins d'Armide (1898)
- Les Dames au jardin (1900)
- Ariane à Naxos, moralité (1901), drama
- Le Souper chez Lucullus, dialogue moral (1901)
- Le mauvais-riche (1907). A review in Le Thyrse by Léon Wéry (1877–1926) wrote of "le déterminisme que M. Ruyters puise dans ses convictions néetzschéennes".
