= Louis Thomas (writer) =

French writer

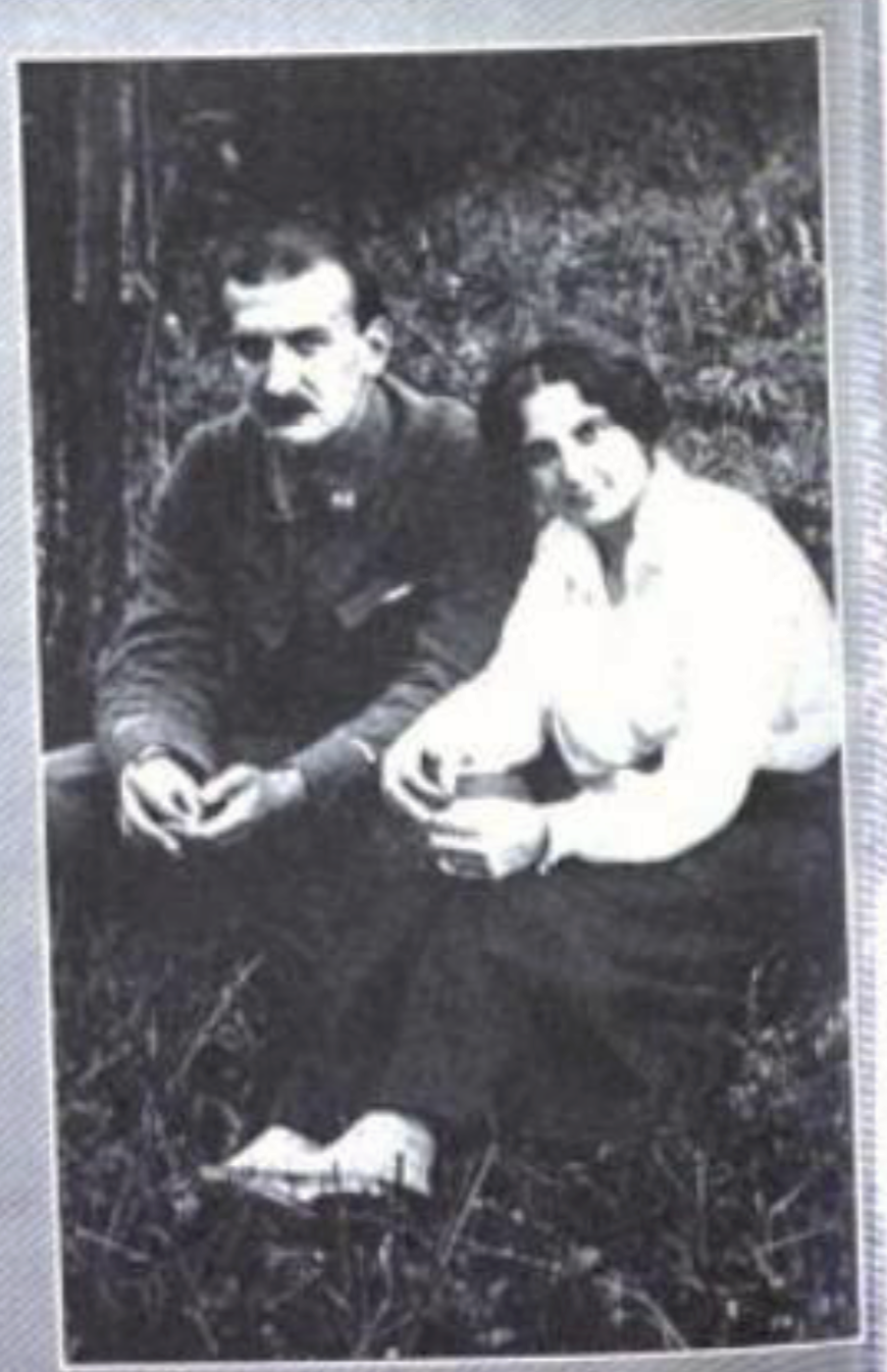
Louis Thomas with his wife, mezzo-soprano Raymonde Delaunois

Louis Thomas (1885–1962) was a French writer.

He was born in Perpignan in 1885 and died in Brussels in 1962. In 1909 he married the mezzo-soprano Raymonde Delaunois.

== Bibliography ==
- Andries VAN DEN ABEELE, Louis Thomas ou de la proximité du Capitole et de la Roche Tarpéenne, Nantes, Editions Ars Magna, 2026.
