= Stuart Gilbert =

English literary scholar and translator (1883–1969)

Arthur Stuart Ahluwalia Stronge Gilbert (25 October 1883 – 5 January 1969) was an English literary scholar and translator. Among his translations into English are works by Alexis de Tocqueville, Édouard Dujardin, André Malraux, Antoine de Saint-Exupéry, Georges Simenon, Jean Cocteau, Albert Camus, and Jean-Paul Sartre, among others. He also assisted in the translation of James Joyce's Ulysses into French.

== Biography ==
=== Personal life ===
Gilbert was born at Kelvedon Hatch, Essex, on 25 October 1883, the only son of a retired army officer, Arthur Stronge Gilbert (1839–1913), and Melvina Kundiher Singh (1860–1913), the daughter of Randhir Singh, the Raja of Kapurthala, and of Rajkumari Bibiji (née Henrietta Hodges and later Henrietta Melvina Oliver) (c. 1843–1893). Gilbert's mother was also known as "Melvina Kaur Sahiba (Princess Melvina Rundheer Singh Ahloowalia)". He attended Cheltenham and Hertford College, Oxford, taking a first in Classical Moderations.

Gilbert joined the Indian Civil Service in 1907. After military service in the First World War, he served as a judge in Burma until 1925. He then retired, settling in France with his French-born wife Marie Agnès Mathilde "Moune" Douin, a French citizen and the co-author (with François Pujol, Pierre Andrieu and Louis Audoubert) of Promenades et excursions dans les montagnes du Biros et du Castillonnais (1979). The couple had one daughter, Madeleine Gilbert, who became a translator and whose published work included "Théâtre" by W.B. Yeats (Paris: Éditions Denoël, 1954; reprinted: Paris: Éditions Rombaldi, 1970 and Paris: Les Presses du compagnonnage, 1970.)

Gilbert remained in France for the rest of his life, except for some time spent in exile in Wales during the Second World War. Gilbert died at his home at 7 rue Jean du Bellay, Paris on 5 January 5 1969. His wife died on 19 May 1992.

=== Literary work ===
Gilbert was one of the first Joycean scholars. He first read Ulysses while he was in Burma and admired it greatly. According to his wife, she and Gilbert were taking a walk in the Latin Quarter of Paris when they passed Shakespeare and Company, and saw some typescript pages of a French translation of Ulysses by Auguste Morel and Valery Larbaud displayed in the window. Gilbert noted several serious errors in the French rendering and introduced himself to Sylvia Beach, who was impressed by his criticisms of the translation. She took his name and telephone number, and suggested that Joyce, who was assisting in the translation, would contact him. This began many years of friendship between Joyce and Gilbert. He published James Joyce's Ulysses: A Study in 1930 (revised edition 1950); contributed an important chapter, "Prolegomena to Work in Progress," to Our Exagmination Round His Factification for Incamination of Work in Progress (1929), a collection of perspectives on the fragments of Joyce's "work in progress," later completed as Finnegans Wake (1939); and published a collection of Joyce's letters in 1957. The Harry Ransom Humanities Research Center at the University of Texas has archival material regarding his relationship with James Joyce and his work as a translator. This material includes correspondence, diaries, notebooks, press clippings and photographs, from the period between 1900 and 1985.

Gilbert was the first English translator of two novels by Albert Camus, The Stranger (translation published 1946) and The Plague (translation published 1948). One of Gilbert's major projects was the translation from French of Roger Martin du Gard's novel sequence Les Thibault. Running to nearly 1,900 pages in translation, it was published by the Viking Press in the United States in two volumes, The Thibaults (1939) and Summer 1914 (1941). In the last decade of his life Gilbert translated numerous texts for the Swiss art book publisher Albert Skira.

== Bibliography ==
=== Translations ===
- Antoine de Saint-Exupéry, Southern Mail (Courier-Sud), New York: Harrison Smith and Robert Haas, 1933. Translation of Saint-Exupéry's novel Courier sud (Paris: Gallimard, 1929).
- Jean Cocteau, Round the World Again in Eighty Days, London: George Routledge & Sons, 1937. Translation of Cocteau's journalistic work Mon Premier Voyage: Tour du Monde en 80 jours (Paris: Gallimard, 1936).
- Georges Simenon, In Two Latitudes, London: George Routledge & Sons, 1942 (contains "The Mystery of the Polarlys" and "Tropic Moon"). Translation of Simenon's novels Le Passager du Polarlys and Coup de Lune.
- Albert Camus, The Outsider, London: Hamish Hamilton, 1946, introduction by Cyril Connolly; The Stranger, New York: Alfred A. Knopf, 1946. Translation of Camus's novel L'Étranger (Paris: Gallimard, 1942).
- Jean-Paul Sartre, No Exit (Huis Clos): A Play in One Act, &, The Flies (Les Mouches): A Play in Three Acts... English Versions by Stuart Gilbert, New York: Alfred A. Knopf, 1947.
- André Malraux, The Psychology of Art, London: Zwemmer, 1949. Three volumes: 1. Museum Without Walls; 2. The Creative Act; 3. The Aftermath of the Absolute.
- André Malraux, The Voices of Silence, New York: Doubleday, 1953; London: Secker & Warburg, 1954.
- André Malraux, The Metamorphosis of the Gods, London: Secker & Warburg, 1960- . Translation of Malraux's La Métamorphose des dieux (Paris: Gallimard, 1957).

=== Other works ===
- James Joyce's Ulysses: A Study, London: Faber & Faber, 1930.
- Letters of James Joyce. Edited by Stuart Gilbert. London: Faber & Faber, 1957; New York: Viking Press, 1957.
- Letters of James Joyce. Edited by Stuart Gilbert and Richard Ellmann. London: Faber & Faber, 1966; New York: Viking Press, 1966.
- Reflections on James Joyce: Stuart Gilbert's Paris Journal, Austin, Texas: University of Texas Press, 1993. Edited by Thomas F. Staley and Randolph Lewis.
