= Eugene Jolas =

American translator

- Born: John George Eugène Jolas; October 26, 1894; Union Hill, New Jersey, United States
- Died: May 26, 1952 (aged 57); Paris, France
- Occupations: Writer, translator, literary critic
- Writing career
- Language: English, French, German

John George Eugène Jolas (October 26, 1894 – May 26, 1952) was a writer, translator and literary critic.

== Early life ==
John George Eugène Jolas was born October 26, 1894, in Union Hill, New Jersey (what is today Union City, New Jersey). His parents, Eugène Pierre and Christine (née Ambach) had immigrated to the United States from the Rhine borderland area between France and Germany several years earlier. In 1897 the family later returned to Forbach in Alsace–Lorraine (today in French Lorraine), where Jolas grew up, and which had become part of Germany in 1871 following the Franco-Prussian War.

In 1909, he moved on his own to New York City, where he learned English while attending DeWitt Clinton Evening High School and earning a modest living as a deliverer.

== Career ==
After schooling, Jolas worked in Pittsburgh as a newspaper journalist for the German-language Volksblatt und Freiheits-Freund and the English-language Pittsburgh Sun.

During 1925 and 1926, Jolas worked for the European edition of the Chicago Tribune in Paris, first on the night desk, then as a reporter. Eventually, David Darrah prompted Jolas to take over the Tribune's literary page from Ford Madox Ford. He did so, and he authored the weekly column, "Rambles through Literary Paris." His work in that capacity allowed him to meet many of the famous and emerging writers of Paris, both French and expatriates alike. These connections would serve him well in his subsequent editorial work.

Along with his wife Maria McDonald and Elliot Paul, in 1927 he founded the influential Parisian literary magazine, transition, in which he translated Franz Kafka into English for the first time.

In Paris, Eugene Jolas met James Joyce and played a major part in encouraging and defending Joyce's 'Work in Progress' (which would later become Finnegans Wake), a work that Jolas viewed as the perfect illustration to his manifesto, published in 1929 in transition.

The manifesto, sometimes referred to as the Revolution of the Word Manifesto, states, 'the revolution in the English language is an accomplished fact', 'time is a tyranny to be abolished', 'the writer expresses, he does not communicate', and 'the plain reader be damned'.

On many occasion, he used to write under the pseudonym 'Theo Rutra'.

As a translator, he is perhaps best known for rendering Alfred Doblin's novel Berlin Alexanderplatz into English in 1931.

In 1941, Jolas published something of a successor to transition in a volume entitled Vertical: A Yearbook for Romantic-Mystic Ascencions.

Jolas subsequently suspended his editing work to join the United States Office of War Information in 1942; he translated war news into French for Allied troops in North Africa as well as the French resistance. In 1945, Jolas went to Germany to help launch denazified newspapers in towns controlled by the allied forces. He was later named editor in chief of the Deutsche Allgemeine Nachrichten-Agentur (DANA, later renamed DENA), an organization established to teach American-style journalism as a means for replacing the Nazis' propaganda apparatus.

== Published works ==
- Cinema: Poems. Introduction by Sherwood Anderson. New York: Adelphi, 1926.
- Le Nègre qui chante. Paris: Éditions des Cahiers libres, 1928.
- An essay on James Joyce in Our Exagmination Round His Factification for Incamination of Work in Progress. London: Faber and Faber, 1929.
- Secession in Astropolis. Paris: Black Sun Press, 1929.
- The Language of Night. The Hague: Servire Press, 1932.
- Hypnolog des Scheltenauges. Paris: Éditions Vertigral, 1932.
- Motsdéluge, hypnologues. Paris: Éditions des Cahiers libre, 1933.
- I Have Seen Monsters and Angels. Paris: transition press, 1938.
- Planets and Angels. Mount Vernon, IA: Cornell College chapbooks, 1940.
- Words from the Deluge. New York: Erhältlich bei Gotham Book Mart, 1941.
- Wanderpoem: Angelic Mythamorphosis of the City of London. Paris: transition press, 1946.
- Man from Babel. Ed. Andreas Kramer and Rainer Rumold. New Haven, CT: Yale University Press, 1998.
- Eugene Jolas: critical writings, 1924–1951. Ed. Klaus H. Kiefer and Rainer Rumold. Evanston, IL: Northwestern University Press, 2009.
