= Maria Jolas =

American publisher (1893–1987)

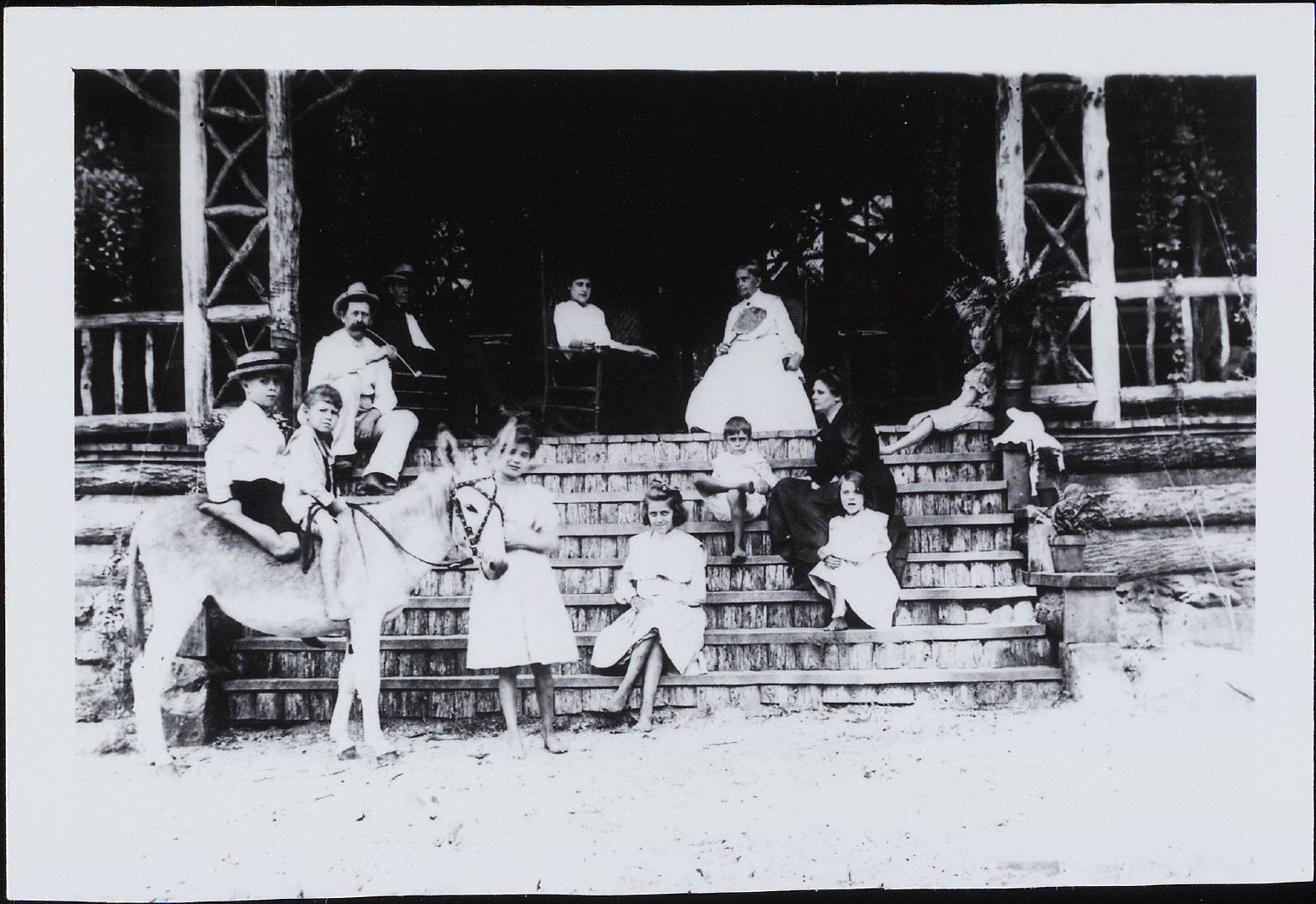
Maria McDonald Jolas, photographed as a child in Louisville, Kentucky, ca. 1910. She is seated in the middle of the staircase.

Maria Jolas (January 12, 1893 – March 4, 1987), born Maria McDonald, was an American translator and pacifist, one of the founding members of transition in Paris with her husband Eugene Jolas.

== Life ==
Jolas was born in Louisville, Kentucky, but became closely associated with European culture.

Jolas and her husband had two daughters, including the composer Betsy Jolas.

A well-known figure at peace conferences, Maria Jolas was active in Europe in opposing the U.S. war in Vietnam 1965–1975. Maria Jolas was the chair/president of the Paris American Committee to Stop-War (PACS, pronounced PACS) with several hundred members, formed in 1965 and banned by the French government in September 1968. She also translated many works, including Gaston Bachelard's The Poetics of Space. She died, aged 94, in Paris, France.

Maria Jolas, Woman of Action - A Memoir and Other Writings was edited and introduced in 2004 by City University of New York professor Mary Ann Caws.
