= Harry Crosby =

American writer (1898–1929)

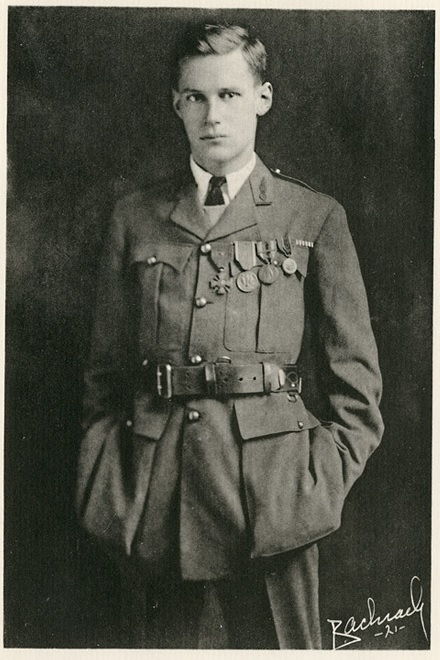
- Crosby in 1919
- Born: Henry Sturgis Crosby; June 4, 1898; Boston, Massachusetts, U.S.
- Died: December 10, 1929 (aged 31); New York City, U.S.
- Cause of death: Suicide
- Education: Noble and Greenough School; St. Mark's School; Harvard University
- Occupations: Publisher; poet; writer; Co-founder, Black Sun Press
- Spouse: Mary Phelps Jacob (m. 1922)
- Relatives: John Schuyler Crosby (grandfather); J. P. Morgan Jr. (uncle)
- Writing career
- Period: 1925–1929
- Notable works: Red Skeletons (1927); Chariot of the Sun (1928); Transit of Venus (1928)

Harry Crosby (June 4, 1898 – December 10, 1929) was an American poet and publisher regarded as a figure of the Lost Generation in American literature. He was the son of one of the richest banking families in New England, a Boston Brahmin, and the nephew of Jane Norton Grew, the wife of financier J. P. Morgan, Jr. As such, he was heir to a portion of a substantial family fortune. He was a volunteer in the American Field Service and later served in the U.S. Ambulance Corps, narrowly escaping with his life. Profoundly affected by his experience in World War I, Crosby vowed to live life on his own terms as a bon vivant, and abandoned all pretense of living the expected life of a privileged Bostonian. In 1920 he met and married Caresse Crosby; their affair was the source of scandal and gossip among blue-blood Boston. He and Caresse subsequently left for Europe, where they devoted themselves to art and poetry.

The couple enjoyed a decadent lifestyle, drinking, smoking opium regularly, traveling frequently, and having an open marriage. In the late 1920s, Crosby wrote and published poetry that dwelt on solar symbolism and mysticism, and explored transgressive themes of sexual intercourse, pagan worship, sacrifice, death and suicide. He numbered among his friends some of the most famous individuals of the early 20th century, including Salvador Dalí, Ernest Hemingway, and Henri Cartier-Bresson. Caresse founded the Black Sun Press with Harry, with it being the first to publish works by several authors who became famous, including Hemingway, D. H. Lawrence, Hart Crane, James Joyce, René Crevel and Kay Boyle. Crosby died in 1929 alongside his new partner Josephine Noyes Rotch, committing a murder–suicide which some speculated was a suicide pact.

== Early life ==
Crosby (born Henry Sturgis Crosby — his parents Stephen Van Rensslaer Crosby and Henrietta Marion Grew later changed his middle name to Grew) was born in Boston's exclusive Back Bay neighborhood. He was the product of generations of blue-blood English and Dutch American families, descended from the Van Rensselaers, Schuylers, Morgans, and Grews. His uncle was J. Pierpont Morgan Jr., one of the richest men in America at that time. His father's mother was the great-granddaughter of Peggy Schuyler, sister-in-law of Alexander Hamilton. Also among Harry's ancestors were Revolutionary War General Philip Schuyler, and William Floyd, a signer of the Declaration of Independence.

He had one sister, Katherine Schuyler Crosby, nicknamed Kitsa, who was born in 1901. They moved shortly after his birth to an estate that had, among other things, a dance floor that could accommodate 150 people. His mother instilled in him a love for poetry. He tossed water bombs off the upper stories of the house onto unsuspecting guests. The family spent its summers on the North Shore of Massachusetts at a second home in Manchester, about 25 miles (40 km) from Boston. His religious, affectionate mother loved nature and was one of the founders of the Garden Club of America. His father, a banker, relived his days as a college football star through his Ivy League and Boston society connections.

As a child, he attended the exclusive Noble and Greenough School. In 1913, when he was 14 years old, his parents decided it was time to send him to the leading Massachusetts prep school, St. Mark's, from which he graduated in 1917.

== World War I ==
(L-R) Philip ('the Vulture") Shepley, Harry Crosby, George Richmond ("Tote") Fearing, and Stuart Kaiser shortly after Armistice Day, 1919, displaying their decorations

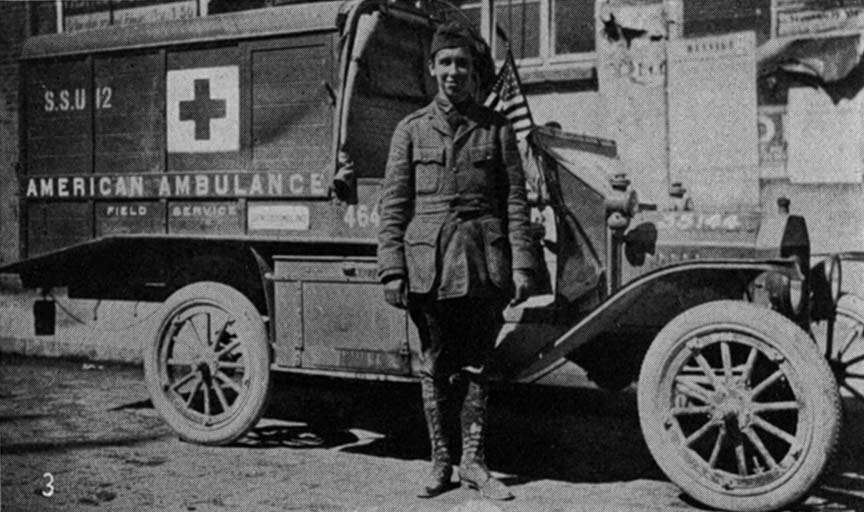
Julien Bryan in front of his Ambulance 464 in April 1917 near Verdun

At age 19, like many young men of upper-crust American society, Crosby volunteered to serve in the American Ambulance Service in France. Writers whose works he later published also served in the ambulance corps, including Ernest Hemingway and Malcolm Cowley. He arrived in France on July 7, 1917.

When America officially entered the War, the American Ambulance Service corps was integrated into the U. S. Army Ambulance Corps and Crosby enlisted. During the Battle of Verdun, he was very close to the front, and ferried wounded soldiers from the front lines to rear areas for three days without relief. On November 22, 1917, as Crosby and his best friend, Way "Spud" Spaulding, and another friend, Ben Weeden, were transporting several wounded soldiers to a medical aid station, Crosby's Ambulance 741 was hit by an artillery shell that landed 10 feet (3.0 m) away, sending shrapnel ripping through the vehicle, completely destroying it. Miraculously, Crosby was unhurt, but Spaulding, following close behind in another ambulance, was struck in the chest by shrapnel. Crosby and Weeden were able to transport him to a hospital. After leaving Spaulding at the hospital in Beaulieu and returning to the aid station, Crosby was seen running in circles, lap after lap, without apparent purpose. Crosby declared later that that was the night he changed from a boy to a man. From that moment on, he never feared death. Spaulding was in intensive care for three months and was released from the hospital after six months.

Crosby wrote many letters home during the two years he was in France. Originally convinced that God had "ordained the war" to cleanse the world, his early reports home were good-spirited. Over time, however, he began to describe the horror of trench warfare and awful scenes of dead and dying soldiers.

I saw the most gruesome sight I've ever seen. Lying on a blood-stained brancard was a man—not older than twenty I afterwards ascertained—suffering the agonies of hell. His whole right cheek was completely shot away so you could see all the insides of his face. He had no jaws, teeth, or lips left. His nose was plastered in. Blood was streaming all over. Under his eyes the skin was just dead blue...It took us an hour driving between two or three miles per hour to get him to his destination. Of course he couldn't yell as his mouth or what was left of it was a mere mass of pulp. For a while I was afraid our ambulance was to be turned into a hearse, but he was still alive when we got him there. Of course in typical French fashion the doctors held their usual debate of questioning whether it was the right hospital or where his papers were.

On August 23–25, 1918, during a battle near Orme, his section (Section Sanitaire 641, attached to the 120th French Division) evacuated more than 2000 wounded and was cited for bravery in the field while under heavy German bombardment. Crosby became in 1919 one of the youngest Americans to be awarded the Croix de guerre. Harry was happy to finally have a medal to prove his valor and wrote home, "Oh Boy!!!!!! won THE CROIX DE GUERRE. Thank God."

When the Armistice was signed, Crosby, like every other soldier, was anxious to go home, but waited for more than a month for orders. He wrote his mother, asking her to get "Uncle Jack" J.P. Morgan to intervene on his behalf. During the war, J.P. Morgan & Company had loaned $1.5 billion dollars ($28.1 billion modern value) to the Allies to fight against the Germans. On March 21, 1919, Crosby left Brest for Boston via Philadelphia and arrived home a hero.

== Attends Harvard ==
After returning from World War I, Crosby attended Harvard University in the spring of 1919 under an accelerated program for veterans. He took 19 courses, six in French (which he read and spoke fluently) and six in English literature. The remainder of his courses were in fine arts, music, Spanish, and social ethics. Taking his studies very lightly, he thought he was going to fail, and paid a knowledgeable man who was familiar with what questions would be asked on the examinations to tutor him. He graduated with a bachelor of arts in 1921.

He yearned, though, to escape the rigidity of everyday life in Boston. His experience in France made it unbearable to live among what he called "dreary, drearier, dreariest Boston" and to put up with "Boston virgins who are brought up among sexless surroundings, who wear canvas drawers and flat-heeled shoes." He wanted to escape "the horrors of Boston and particularly of Boston virgins." Any sense of propriety was wiped out by a lust for living in the moment, forgetting all risks and possible consequences.

== Meets Mrs. Richard Peabody ==
Crosby's mother invited Mrs. Richard Rogers Peabody (née Mary Phelps Jacob) to chaperone Crosby and some of his friends at a picnic on July 4, 1920, including dinner and a trip to the amusement park at Nantasket Beach. During dinner, Crosby never spoke to the girl on his left, breaking decorum. By some accounts, Crosby fell in love with the buxom Mrs. Peabody in about two hours, confessing his love for her in the Tunnel of Love at the amusement park. Two weeks later, they went to church together in Manchester-by-the-Sea, Massachusetts and spent the night together. Their public relationship was a scandal among blue-blood Boston.

She was 28, six years older than Crosby, with two small children, and married. No matter what Crosby tried, Polly would not divorce Richard and marry him. Crosby took a job in Boston at the Shawmut National Bank, a job he disliked, and took the train to visit Polly in New York. In May 1921, when Polly would not respond to his demands, Crosby threatened suicide if Polly did not marry him. Polly's husband Richard Peabody was in and out of sanatoriums several times fighting alcoholism. In June 1921, she formally separated from him. Later that winter, Polly accepted weekend visits from Crosby, who took the midnight train home to Boston afterward. In December, Polly's husband Richard offered to divorce her, and in February 1922, their marriage was legally ended.

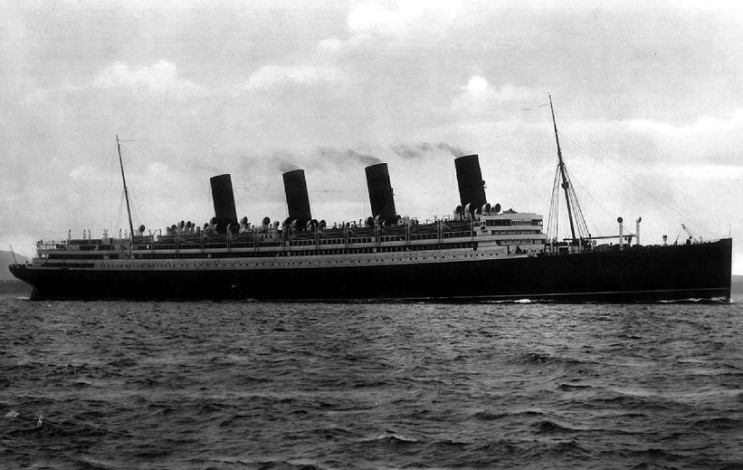
The RMS Aquitania in 1914

After eight months at the Shawmut National Bank, Crosby got drunk for six days and resigned on March 14, 1922. Crosby's uncle, J. P. Morgan, Jr., agreed to provide a position for Crosby in Paris at Morgan, Harjes et Cie. Crosby already spoke and read fluent French and moved to Paris in May. Polly preceded him there, but returned to the United States in July, angry and jealous. On September 2, 1922, Crosby proposed to Polly via transatlantic cable, and the next day bribed his way aboard the Aquitania, which made a weekly six-day express run to New York.

=== Polly and Harry marry ===
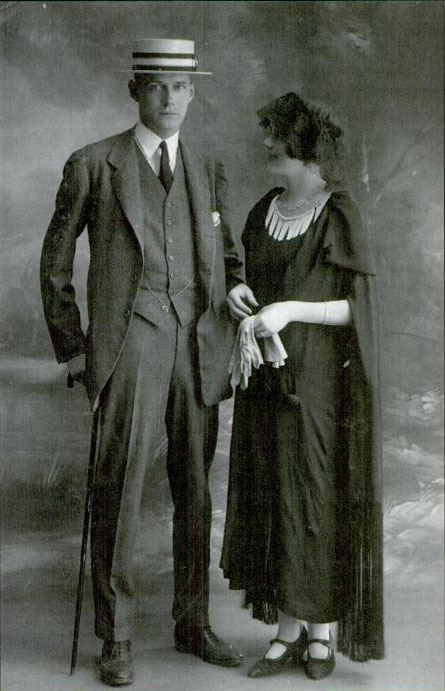
Harry and Polly Crosby on the day of their marriage on September 9, 1922

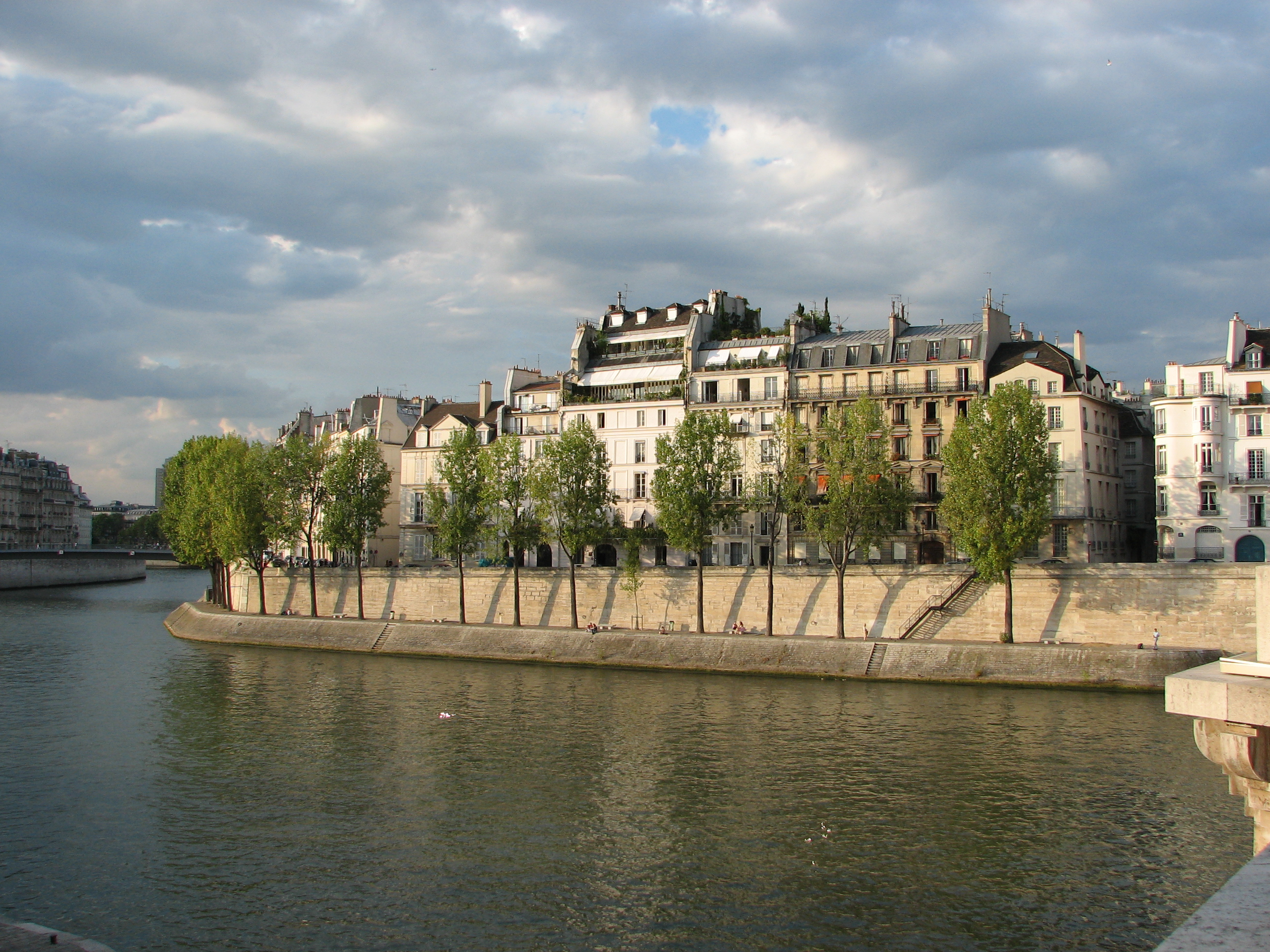
Crosby and Polly lived in an apartment on one of two islands on the Seine during 1922.

On September 9, 1922, Crosby and Polly were married in the Municipal Building in New York City, and two days later they reboarded the RMS Aquitania and moved with her children to Paris. There, they joined the Lost Generation of expatriate Americans disillusioned by the loss of life in World War I and the moral and social values of their parents' generation. Crosby continued his work at Morgan, Harjes et Cie, the Morgan family's bank in Paris. They found an apartment at 12, Quai d'Orléans overlooking the Seine, on the exclusive Île Saint-Louis, and Polly donned her red bathing suit and rowed Crosby down the Seine in his dark business suit, formal hat, umbrella, and briefcase to the Place de la Concorde, where he walked the last few blocks to the bank on Place Vendôme. As she rowed back home, Polly, who was well endowed, enjoyed whistles, jeers, and waves from workmen. She said the exercise was good for her breasts.

After their first year in Paris, Polly shipped her children off to boarding schools in Gstaad. At the end of 1923, Crosby quit Morgan, Harjes et Cie and devoted himself to the life of a poet, and later, publisher.

=== Life as expatriates ===
Both of them were attracted to the bohemian lifestyle of the artists gathering in Montparnasse. Even by the wild standards of Paris in the 1920s, Crosby was in a league of his own. The couple lived a hedonistic and decadent life, including an open marriage and numerous affairs. They drank "oceans of champagne" and used opium, cocaine, and hashish. They wrote a mutual suicide pact and carried cremation instructions with them.

Polly and Crosby purchased their first race horse in June 1924, and then two more in April 1925. At the end of 1924, Crosby persuaded Polly to formally change her first name to Caresse, as he felt Polly was too prim and proper for his wife. They briefly considered Clytoris before deciding on Caresse, Crosby suggesting that her new name "begin with a C to go with Crosby and it must form a cross with mine." The two names intersected at right angles at the common "R," "the Crosby cross."

In 1924, they rented an apartment in the Faubourg St. Germain for six months from Princess Marthe Bibesco, a friend of Crosby's cousin Walter Berry, for 50,000 francs (the equivalent of $2,200, about $41,330 in modern dollars). When they moved in, they brought with them "two maids and a cook, a governess, and a chauffeur."

His inheritance, multiplied by the favorable exchange rate the American dollar enjoyed in postwar Europe, allowed them to indulge in an extravagant expatriate lifestyle. Crosby's trust fund provided them with US$12,000 per year (or $225,000 in modern dollars). Still, Crosby repeatedly overdrew his account at State Street Trust in Boston and at Morgan, Harjes, in Paris.

During 1929, Crosby wired his father, an investment banker, several times asking him to put more money from his inheritance into his account. In January, he asked his father to sell $4,000 worth (or $75,000 modern value) "to make up for past extravagances in New York" In May, he noted in his diary that he had sold another $4,000 worth of stock "to enjoy life when you can". In mid-July, drunk on sherry cobblers, he sent the following cable to his father:

PLEASE SELL $10,000 WORTH OF STOCK. WE HAVE DECIDED TO LIVE A MAD AND EXTRAVAGANT LIFE

His father was not pleased, but complied while rebuking his son for his spendthrift ways.

=== Lifestyle ===
The couple became known for hosting small dinner parties from their giant bed in their palatial townhouse on Île Saint-Louis, and afterward everyone was invited to enjoy their huge bathtub together, taking advantage of iced bottles of champagne near at hand.

They took extended traveling tours. In January 1925, they traveled to North Africa, where they first smoked opium, a habit to which they returned often. Crosby had tattoos on the soles of his feet—a cross on one and a pagan sun symbol on the other.

On November 19, 1925, Crosby and Polly rented a fashionable apartment on 19, Rue de Lille, where they remained for the rest of their time in Paris.

Crosby developed an obsessive fascination with imagery centering on the sun. His poetry and journals often focused on the sun, a symbol to him of perfection, enthusiasm, freedom, heat, and destruction. Crosby claimed to be a "sun worshiper in love with death." He often added a doodle of a "black sun" to his signature which also included an arrow, jutting upward from the "y" in Crosby's last name and aiming toward the center of the sun's circle: "a phallic thrust received by a welcoming erogenous zone."

Crosby met Ernest Hemingway on a skiing trip to Gstaad in 1926. In July 1927, Crosby and Hemingway visited Pamplona for the running of the bulls. Crosby wrote of Hemingway that "H. could drink us under the table." Harry and Caresse published the Paris edition of Hemingway's The Torrents of Spring. In early 1928, they traveled to the Middle East, visiting several countries.

In late 1928, they secured a 20-year lease on a medieval mill outside of Paris in Ermenonville for living quarters, which they named Le Moulin du Soleil ("The Mill of the Sun"). It had three old stone buildings, no electricity or telephone, and a single bathroom. The Crosbys added a racing course on which to play donkey polo and a small swimming pool. The millstream had slowed to a trickle. Inside the mill, Caresse converted the old washrooms and cellars into a large kitchen. The ground floor of the central mill tower served as a dining room, where guests sat on logs cut from the neighboring woods. The mill also contained a solid brass marine cannon that was rolled out for special guests, who were announced with a loud report. A whitewashed wall near the stairway served as a guest book. It was signed by many guests who included D. H. Lawrence, Douglas Fairbanks, the future George VI, and Eva Braun, Adolf Hitler's future wife.

They hosted wild parties at the mill, including drunken polo on donkeys, and entertained famous guests such as Salvador Dalí. Harry wrote in his journal:

Mobs for luncheon—poets and painters and pederasts and divorcées and Christ knows who and there was a great signing of names on the wall at the foot of the stairs and a firing off of the cannon and bottle after bottle of red wine and Kay Boyle made fun of Hart Crane and he was angry and flung The American Caravan into the fire because it contained a story of Kay Boyle's (he forgot it had a poem of his in it) and there was a tempest of drinking and polo harra burra on the donkeys. and [sic] an uproar and a confusion so that it was difficult to do my work.

Crosby spent hours sunbathing naked atop the mill's turret. Contrary to fashion of the day, he did not wear a hat. He often wore a black carnation in his lapel, and was known to color his finger- and toenails. Crosby once hired four horse-drawn carriages and raced them through the Paris streets. They frequently dropped in at Drosso where they smoked opium.

Crosby experimented with photography and saw the medium as a viable art form before it was widely accepted as such. In 1929, he met Henri Cartier-Bresson in Le Bourget, where Cartier-Bresson's air squadron commandant had placed him under house arrest for hunting without a license. Crosby persuaded the officer to release Cartier-Bresson into his custody for a few days. The two men had an interest in photography, and Henry presented Henri with his first camera. They spent their time together taking and printing pictures at Crosby's home, Le Moulin du Soleil. Cartier-Bresson was attracted to Caresse and began a sexual relationship with her that lasted until 1931, two years after Harry's suicide.

Crosby also learned to fly solo in November 1929, when the aeroplane was so new that its spelling had not been agreed upon.

=== Extra-marital relationships ===
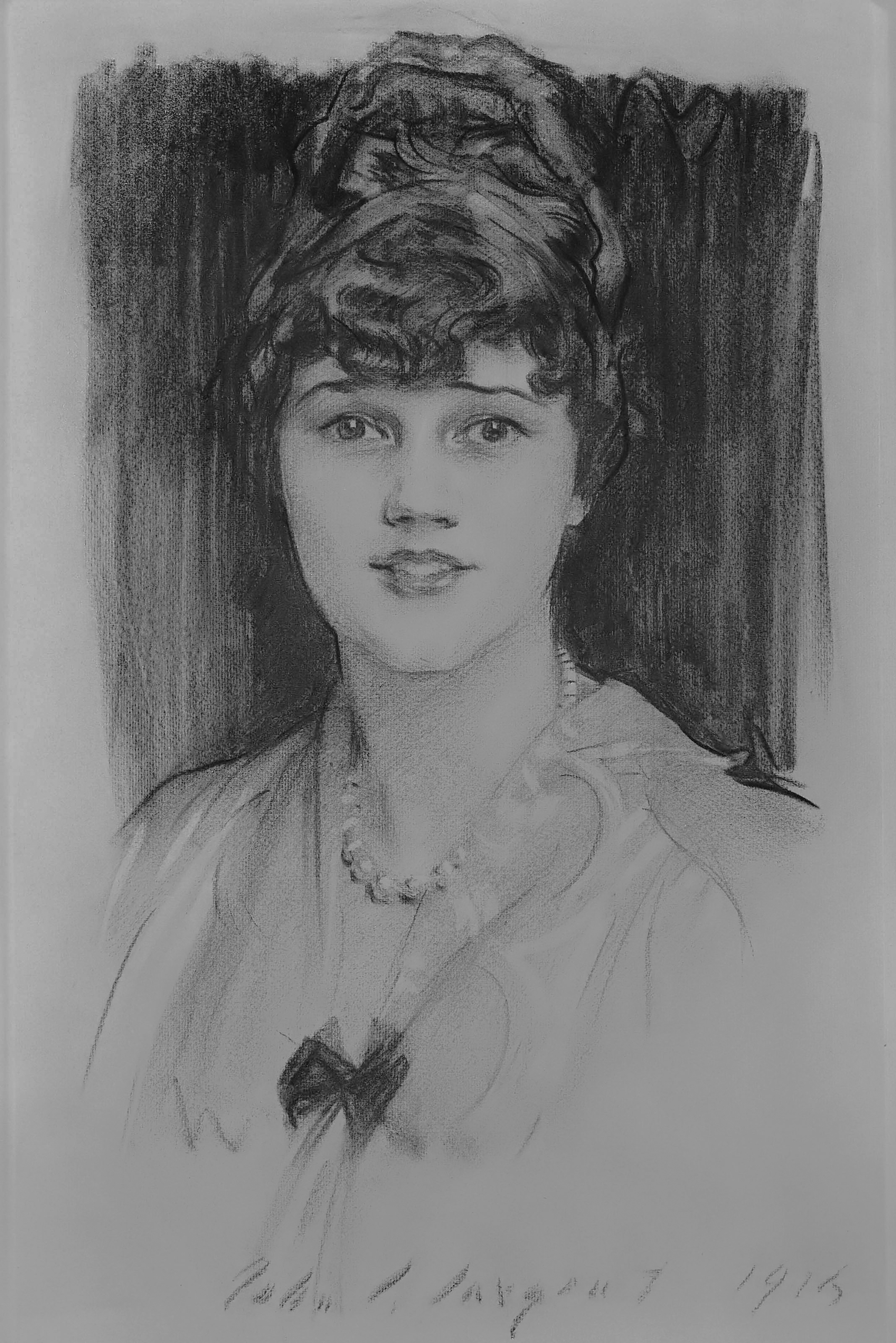
Constance Coolidge (1892-1973) (John Singer Sargent, 1915)

In 1923, shortly after their arrival in Paris, Caresse introduced Crosby to her friend Constance Crowninshield Coolidge, also a Boston Brahmin, an American expatriate. She was the niece of Frank Crowninshield, editor of Vanity Fair, and had been married to American diplomat Ray Atherton. Constance did not care what others thought about her. She loved anything risky and was addicted to gambling. Crosby nicknamed her the "Lady of the Golden Horse". She began a sexual relationship with Crosby that continued for several months. Harry rationalized their affair, telling Constance "One should follow every instinct no matter where it leads." But Crosby would not leave Caresse nor did Constance ask this of him. When Constance received a letter from Caresse who confessed that her affair with her husband had made her "very miserable", Constance wrote Harry and told him she would not see him any more. Harry was devastated by her decision. "Your letter was bar none the worst blow I have ever received...I wouldn't leave her under any circumstances nor as you say would you ever marry me." The three remained close friends, and on October 1, 1924, Constance married the Count Pierre de Jumilhac, although the marriage lasted only five years.

Harry and Caresse decided on an open marriage and had several lovers. He became legendary for his seductive abilities in some social circles in Paris, maintaining relationships with a variety of beautiful and doting young women.

Their wildness was in full flower during the drunken orgies of the annual Four Arts Balls (Bal des Quatz' Arts). In July 1927, he turned 10 live snakes loose on the dance floor. He wrote in his diary about it later:

I remember two strong young men stark naked wrestling on the floor for the honor of dancing with a young girl...and I remember a mad student drinking champagne out of a skull which he had pilfered from my Library as I had pilfered it a year ago from the Catacombs...and in a corner I watched two savages making love...and beside me sitting on the floor a plump woman with bare breasts absorbed in the passion of giving milk to one of the snakes!

One year, Caresse arrived topless riding a baby elephant and wearing a turquoise wig. The motif for the ball that year was Inca, and Crosby dressed for the occasion, covering himself in red ochre and wearing nothing but a loincloth and a necklace of dead pigeons.

Embracing the open sexuality offered by Crosby and his wife Caresse, Henri Cartier-Bresson fell into an intense sexual relationship with her that lasted until 1931.

== Black Sun Press ==
Illustration by Alastair from Harry Crosby's book Red Skeletons, published in 1927

In April, 1927, they founded an English language publishing company, first titled Éditions Narcisse, after their black whippet Narcisse Noir. They used the press as an avenue to publish their own poetry in small editions of finely made hardbound volumes.

They printed, on high-quality paper, limited quantities of meticulously produced, hand-manufactured books. Publishing in Paris during the 1920s and 1930s put the company at the crossroads for many American writers who were living abroad. In 1928, as Éditions Narcisse, they printed a limited edition of 300 numbered copies of "The Fall of the House of Usher" by Edgar Allan Poe with illustrations by Alastair.

In 1928, they found they enjoyed the reception their initial works received, and decided to expand the press to serve other authors, renaming the company the Black Sun Press, following on Crosby's obsession with the symbolism of the sun. They rapidly gained notice for publishing beautifully bound, typographically flawless editions of unusual books. They took exquisite care with the books they published, choosing the finest papers and inks.

They published early works of several writers before they were well known, including James Joyce's Tales Told of Shem and Shaun (which was later integrated into Finnegans Wake). They published Kay Boyle's first book-length work, Short Stories, in 1929. and works by Hart Crane, D. H. Lawrence, Ezra Pound, Archibald MacLeish, Ernest Hemingway, Laurence Sterne, and Eugene Jolas. The Black Sun Press evolved into one of the most important small presses in Paris in the 1920s. After Crosby died (see section "Murder and Suicide," below), Caresse Crosby continued publishing into the 1940s.

== The Fire Princess ==
On July 9, 1928, Crosby met 20-year-old Josephine Noyes Rotch, the daughter of Arthur and Helen Ludington Rotch of Boston. Ten years his junior, Josephine was shopping in Venice at the Lido for her wedding dress. She had belonged to the Vincent Club and the Junior League and graduated from Lee School before she had attended Bryn Mawr College. After only two years at Bryn Mawr, she left because she planned to marry Albert Bigelow. "She was dark and intense...since the season of her coming out in 1926-1927, she had been known around Boston as fast, a 'bad egg'...with a good deal of sex appeal."

They met for sex as often as her eight days in Venice would allow. He later called her the "Youngest Princess of the Sun" and the "Fire Princess". She was also from a prominent Boston family which first settled in Provincetown, Massachusetts in 1690. Josephine inspired Crosby's next collection of poems, which he dedicated to her, titled Transit of Venus. In a letter dated July 24, 1928, Crosby detailed the affair to his mother, in whom he had always confided:

I am having an affair with a girl I met (not introduced) at the Lido. She is twenty and has charm and is called Josephine. I like girls when they are very young before they have any minds.

Josephine and Crosby had an ongoing affair until June 21, 1929, when she married Albert Smith Bigelow. Their affair was over—until August, when Josephine contacted Crosby and they rekindled the affair as her husband became a first- year graduate student of architecture at Harvard. Unlike his wife Caresse, Josephine was quarrelsome and prone to fits of jealousy. She bombarded Crosby with half-incoherent cables and letters, anxious to set the date for their next tryst.

=== Visit to United States ===
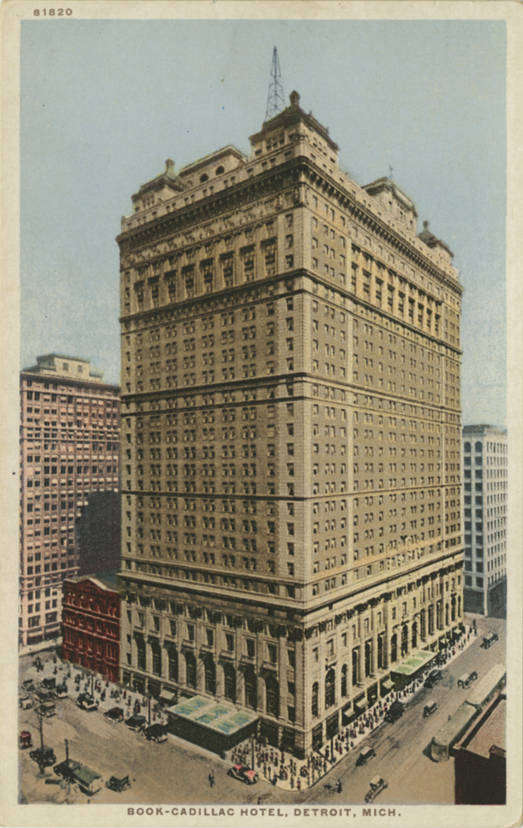
The Book Cadillac Hotel in the 1920s.

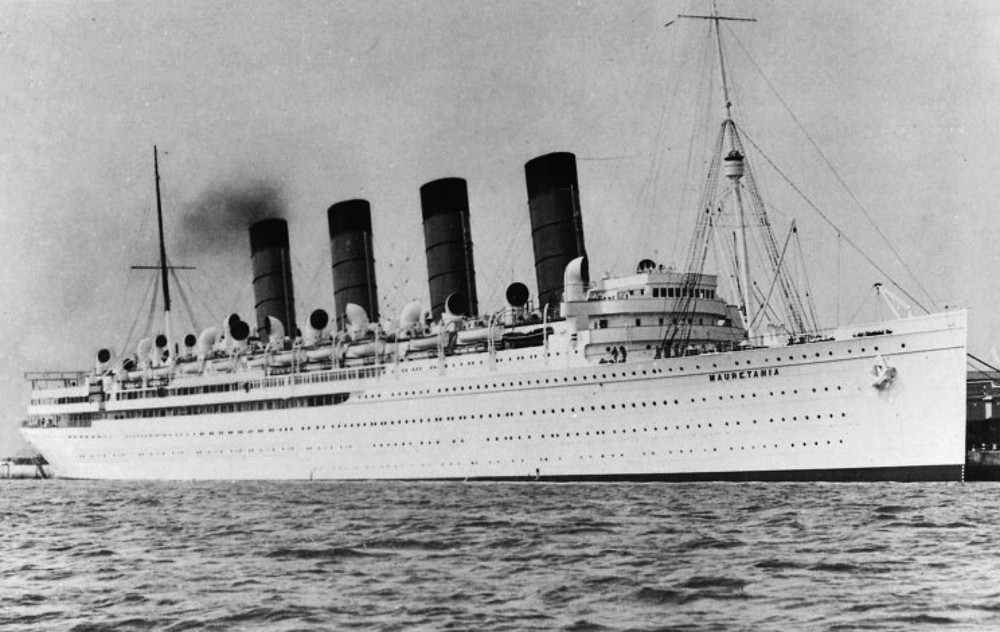
RMS Mauretania during the 1930s

On November 20, 1929, the Crosbys returned to the United States aboard the RMS Mauretania for a visit and the Harvard-Yale football game. Crosby and Josephine met and traveled to Detroit, where they checked into the expensive ($12 a day— or $225 modern value) Book-Cadillac Hotel as Mr. and Mrs Harry Crane. For four days, they took meals in their room, smoked opium, and had sex.

On December 7, 1929, the lovers returned to New York, where Josephine said she was going to return to Boston and her husband. Crosby's friend Hart Crane threw a party that evening to celebrate his completion after seven years of his poem, The Bridge. The Black Sun Press was scheduled to publish it the next week, and he wanted to bid Crosby and Caresse bon voyage, since they were due to sail back to France the next week. Among the guests present were Margaret Robson, Malcolm Cowley, Walker Evans, E. E. Cummings, and William Carlos Williams. The party went on until nearly dawn. Crosby and Caresse made plans to see Crane again before they left for Europe on December 10 to attend the popular Broadway play Berkeley Square.

On December 9, Josephine, who instead of returning to Boston, had stayed with one of her bridesmaids in New York, sent a 36-line poem to Harry Crosby, who was staying with Caresse at the Savoy-Plaza Hotel. The last line of the poem read "Death is our marriage".

On the same day, Harry Crosby wrote his final entry in his journal: "One is not in love unless one desires to die with one's beloved. There is only one happiness it is to love and to be loved."

== Murder and suicide ==
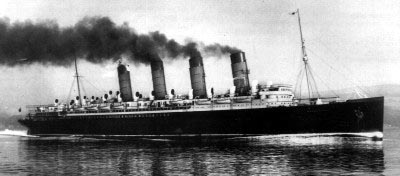
The Mauretania before 1923

On the evening of the play, December 10, 1929, Caresse, Crosby's mother Henrietta Grew, and Hart Crane met for dinner before the play, but Crosby did not show up, which was uncharacteristic of him as it was not like him to needlessly cause Caresse to worry. She called their friend, painter Stanley Mortimer (1897–1984) at his mother's apartment, whose studio Crosby was known to use for his trysts. He agreed to check his studio. Mortimer had to enlist help to break open the locked door and found Crosby and Josephine's bodies. Crosby was in bed with a .25 calibre bullet hole in his right temple next to Josephine, who had a matching hole in her left temple. Crosby was still clutching the Belgian automatic pistol in one hand, Josephine in the other.

The steamship tickets he had bought that morning for the return to Europe with Caresse were in his pocket. The coroner also found in his pocket a cable from Josephine addressed to Crosby on the RMS Mauretania. The coroner reported that Crosby's toenails were painted red, and that he had a Christian cross tattooed on the sole of one foot and a pagan icon representing the sun on the other.

Crosby's wedding ring was found crushed on the floor, not on his finger, where he always promised Caresse it would remain. Caresse refused to witness the carnage and begged Archibald MacLeish, who was in town from his farm, to take charge. While waiting for the doctors to finish their examination, MacLeish wondered if Crosby's literary aspirations had not contributed to his death.

As I sat there looking at his corpse, seating myself where I wouldn't have to see the horrible hole in back of his ear, I kept saying to him: you poor, damned, dumb bastard. He was the most literary man I ever met, despite the fact that he'd not yet become what you'd call a Writer. I never met anyone who was so imbued with literature; he was drowned in it. I think I'm close to deciding literature is the one thing never to be taken seriously...

Crosby's suicide, along with Hart Crane's suicide two and a half years later, was cited by later writers as emblematic of the Lost Generation.

=== Scandal follows ===
The next day, the headlines revealed all: Tragedy and Disgrace. There was no suicide note, and newspapers ran sensational articles for many days about the murder or suicide pact—they could not decide which. The New York Times front page blared, "COUPLE SHOT DEAD IN ARTISTS' HOTEL; Suicide Compact Is Indicated Between Henry Grew Crosby and Harvard Man's Wife. BUT MOTIVE IS UNKNOWN. He Was Socially Prominent in Boston—Bodies Found in Friend's Suite." The New York newspapers decided it was a murder-suicide.

Gretchen Powell had lunch with Crosby the day of his death. Her memory of the luncheon supported the notion that Josephine was one of Crosby's many passing fancies. She related that Crosby had told her, "the Rotch girl was pestering him; he was exasperated; she had threatened to kill herself in the lobby of the Savoy-Plaza if he didn't meet her at once."

The deaths polarized the several prominent families affected. The Rotch family considered Josephine's death to be murder. Josephine's erstwhile husband Albert Bigelow blamed Crosby for "seducing his wife and murdering her because he couldn't have her."

Crosby's poetry possibly gave the best clue to his motives. Death was "the hand that opens the door to our cage the home we instinctively fly to." His death mortified proper society. Crosby's biographer Geoffrey Wolff wrote, "He had meant to do it; it was no mistake; it was not a joke. If anything of Harry Crosby commands respect, perhaps even awe, it was the unswerving character of his intention." Crosby's death, given the macabre circumstances under which it occurred, scandalized Boston's Back Bay society.

== Legacy ==
Crosby as a poet was never more than a minor literary figure while he lived, and was remembered more for his scandalous suicide than his creative efforts. He has greater importance as a co-founder of the Black Sun Press, which Caresse continued to operate after his death. She also established, with Jacques Porel, a side venture, Crosby Continental Editions, that published paperback books by Ernest Hemingway, William Faulkner, and Dorothy Parker, among others. The paperback books did not sell well, and Crosby Continental closed in 1933. The Black Sun Press, however, continued publishing into the 1950s. The Black Sun Press produced finely crafted books in small editions, including works by, among others, D. H. Lawrence, Archibald MacLeish, James Joyce, Kay Boyle, and Hart Crane.

Crosby's friend Crane committed suicide less than two years later. Malcolm Cowley, whom Crosby had published, wrote in his 1934 book Exile's Return, that the death of "Harry Crosby becomes a symbol" of the rise and fall of the Jazz Age. He recited the excesses typified by Crosby's extravagant lifestyle as evidence of the shallowness of society during that era. When he edited and reissued the book in 1951, he softened his opinion of Crosby somewhat. "I had written at length about the life of Harry Crosby, who I scarcely know," he wrote, "in order to avoid discussing the more recent death of Hart Crane, whom I know so well that I couldn't bear to write about him."

In 1931, Caresse also published Torchbearer, a collection of Crosby's poetry with an afterword by Ezra Pound, and Aphrodite in Flight, a 75-paragraph-long prose-poem and how-to manual for lovers that compared making love to a woman to flying planes. Caresse published a boxed set of Crosby's work titled Collected Poems of Harry Crosby containing Chariot of the Sun with D. H. Lawrence's introduction, Transit of Venus with T. S. Eliot's introduction, Sleeping Together with Stuart Gilbert's introduction, and Torchbearer in 1931. It was hand-set in dorique type; only 50 copies were printed.

During 1931 and 1932, Caresse collaborated with Harry's mother Henrietta to publish letters he had written to his family while serving in France from the summer of 1917 until he returned home in 1919. Henrietta added a chronology and brief preface to the letters. The book War Letters was published in a unnumbered edition of 125 copies. As of 2015, a leather-bound edition of the book was priced from $2,000 to $3,500.

Caresse Crosby edited and published Crosby's diaries and papers. She wrote and published Poems for Harry Crosby in 1931. She also published and translated some of the works of Hemingway, Faulkner, and Dorothy Parker, among others. The Black Sun Press enjoyed the greatest longevity among the several expatriate presses founded in Paris during the 1920s. Through 1936, it published nearly three times as many titles as did Edward Titus through his Black Manikin Press.

Books printed by the Black Sun Press are valued by collectors. Each book was hand-designed, beautifully printed, and illustrated with elegant typeface. A rare volume published by the Black Sun Press of Hart Crane's book-length poem The Bridge, including photos by Walker Evans, was sold by Christie's in 2009 for US$21,250. In 2009, Neil Pearson, an antiquarian books expert, said "A Black Sun book is the literary equivalent of a Braque or a Picasso painting—except it's a few thousand pounds, not 20 million."

Ladders to the Sun: Poems by Harry Crosby, a collection of Harry Crosby's poetry, was published by Soul Bay Press in April 2010.

In 2004, Fine Line Features optioned Andrea Berloff's first screenplay Harry and Caresse. Lasse Hallström was initially attached to direct and Leslie Holleran was attached as a producer.

== Works ==
- Sonnets for Caresse. (1925) Paris, Herbert Clarke.
- Sonnets for Caresse. (1926) 2nd Edition. Paris, Herbert Clarke.
- Sonnets for Caresse. (1926) 3rd Edition. Paris, Albert Messein.
- Sonnets for Caresse. (1927) 4th Edition. Paris, Editions Narcisse.
- Red Skeletons. (1927) Paris, Editions Narcisse.
- Chariot of the Sun. (1928) Paris, At the Sign of the Sundial.
- Shadows of the Sun. (1928) Paris, Black Sun Press.
- Transit of Venus. (1928) Paris, Black Sun Press (2nd edition 1929).
- Mad Queen. (1929) Paris, Black Sun Press.
- Shadows of the Sun-Series Two. (1929) Paris, Black Sun Press.
- The Sun. (1929) Paris, Black Sun Press (Miniature book).
- Sleeping Together. (1929) Paris, Black Sun Press. (500 copies printed)
- Shadows of the Sun-Series Three. (1930) Paris, Black Sun Press.
- Aphrodite in Flight: Being Some Observations on the Aerodynamics of Love. (1930) Paris, Black Sun Press.
- Collected Poems of Harry Crosby. (4 Volumes: Chariot of the Sun, Transit of Venus, Sleeping Together, and Torchbearer). (1931) Paris, Black Sun Press
- War Letters. Preface by Henrietta Crosby. (1932) Paris, Black Sun Press. 125 unnumbered copies.

== See also ==
- List of ambulance drivers during World War I

== Sources ==
- Minkoff, George Robert. A Bibliography of the Black Sun Press...With an introduction by Caresse Crosby. (Great Neck, N.Y.: G. R. Minkoff, 1970)
- Wolff, Geoffrey. Black Sun: The Brief Transit and Violent Eclipse of Harry Crosby (Random House, 1976) ISBN 0-394-47450-3; (repr. New York Review of Books, 2003) ISBN 1-59017-066-0
