= Black Sun Press =

English-language publisher in France (1927–1970)

- Status: Defunct
- Predecessor: Editions Narcisse
- Founded: 1927; 99 years ago
- Founder: Harry Crosby; Caresse Crosby
- Defunct: January 1970; 56 years ago
- Country of origin: France
- Headquarters location: Paris
- Publication types: Books
- Imprints: Crosby Continental Editions

The Black Sun Press was an English-language press noted for publishing the early works of many modernist writers including Hart Crane, D. H. Lawrence, Archibald MacLeish, Ernest Hemingway, and Eugene Jolas. It enjoyed the greatest longevity among the several expatriate presses founded in Paris during the 1920s, publishing nearly three times as many titles as did Edward Titus under his Black Manikin Press. American expatriates living in Paris, Harry Crosby and his wife Caresse Crosby (American inventor of the modern bra) founded the press to publish their own work in April 1927 as Éditions Narcisse. They added to that in 1928 when they printed a limited edition of 300 numbered copies of "The Fall of the House of Usher" by Edgar Allan Poe. They enjoyed the reception their initial work received, and decided to expand the press to serve other authors, renaming the company the Black Sun Press, following on Harry's obsession on the symbolism of the sun.

They published exclusively limited quantities of meticulously produced, hand-manufactured books, printed on high-quality paper. During the 1920s and 1930s Paris was at the crossroads of many emerging expatriate American writers, collectively called the Lost Generation. They published early works of a number of writers before they were well-known, including James Joyce's Tales Told of Shem and Shaun (later integrated into Finnegans Wake). They published Kay Boyle's first book-length work, Short Stories, in 1929. The Black Sun Press evolved into one of the most important small presses in Paris in the 1920s. After Harry died in a suicide pact with one of his many lovers, Caresse Crosby continued the press' work into the 1940s.

== Publish own works ==
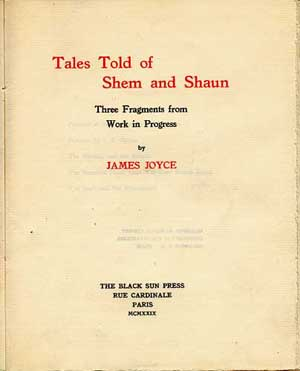
Cover of Tales of Shem and Shaun by James Joyce published by Caresse Crosby and Harry Crosby, owners and publishers of the Black Sun Press.

Harry and Caresse Crosby began publishing their own poetry in 1925. One of their first two books was a volume of poetry by Caresse, Crosses of Gold, printed by Léon Pichon and published in 1925. Its frontleaf bore their names in the form of a gold cross with the 'r' in Caresse intersecting the first 'r' in Harry's name. The second was Harry’s Sonnets for Caresse. Dissatisfied with the quality of the printing of these books they sought out Roger Lescaret, a master printer, whose shop at No. 2, Rue Cardinale was not far from the Crosbys' apartment in Paris. His previous works had been limited to funeral notices, but that did not deter them. Lescaret printed Harry Crosby's next collection of poetry, Red Skeletons, with illustrations by their friend Alastair, as well as other volumes of poetry including Harry Crosby's Painted Shores (1927), said to be heavily influenced by Charles Baudelaire and Edgar Allan Poe. They were so happy with the result that they decided to start a press to publish other works. They followed with two books by Caresse, Painted Shores and The Stranger.

== Expand press ==
They rented space above Roger Lescaret's print shop at 2, rue Cardinal. The books were handmade, "lavishly bound, typographically impeccable" versions of unusual books that interested them, like The Fall of the House of Usher by Edgar Allan Poe with illustrations by Alastair (Baron Hans Henning Voigt). They printed a Hindu "Love Book," and letters sent to Harry’s cousin, Walter Berry, by Henry James. Harry chose the titles and Caresse edited the books. Both selected the typeface, margins, and so forth. Harry created the bindings, boxes, and ribbons in expensive state-of-the art materials made by Babout.

The Crosbys published a number of eminent 20th century authors before they became well-known, including D. H. Lawrence and James Joyce, both of whom were friends of Crosbys. Additional authors published by the Black Sun Press include Kay Boyle, whose first book Short Stories was published by Black Sun. Other authors included Ezra Pound, Archibald MacLeish, Ernest Hemingway, Eugene Jolas and Oscar Wilde.

== Support of experimental writing ==
In 1927, they became editors of poet Eugene Jolas' quarterly literary Journal transition, an outlet for experimental writing that featured the most modern, surrealist, and other linguistically innovative writing. They were frequent visitors to Shakespeare and Company, a bookshop founded by Sylvia Beach. They sold their collection of Kay Boyle's short stories through Shakespeare and Company.

In 1928, Harry and Caresse changed the name of the press to the Black Sun Press in keeping with Harry's fascination with the symbolism of the sun. The press rapidly gained notice for publishing beautifully bound, typographically flawless editions of unusual books. They took exquisite care with the books they published, choosing the finest papers and inks.

== Expand literary circle ==
Their literary tastes matured and they sought out their Parisian literary friends and offered to publish their writing. Their friends included D. H. Lawrence, for whom they published a limited edition of 50 copies of The Escaped Cock, illustrated by John Farleigh, in September 1929 (later re-published as The Man Who Died). Lawrence later wrote the introduction to Harry Crosby's volume of poetry, Chariot of the Sun.

Harry occasionally spent time with one of their authors, Ernest Hemingway, who he had met skiing, and in July 1927 they visited Pamplona for the running of the bulls. Harry often drank to excess when with Hemingway. Although Harry spoke fluent French, they socialized primarily among fellow American expatriates. They became close friends with some of the authors they worked with. When Harry visited New York in 1928, he cashed in some stock dividends to help Boyle pay for an abortion.

In 1928, Harry's cousin Walter Berry died, leaving a considerable collection of over 8,000 mostly rare books. In his will he left "all the rest of my books...except such books which Edith Wharton may desire to take...I give and bequeath to my cousin, Harry Grew Crosby." Harry eagerly campaigned to persuade Berry's long-time friend Edith Wharton to give him a great many of the books, and in the end she kept less than 100. Harry prized the collection at first but he became enamored of the idea of reducing the things around him. Caresse later wrote, "We had talked to a wise man in Egypt in 1928 who said, 'My wealth I measure by the things I do without,' and Harry believed the books weighed him down." Every morning he would leave with a satchel full of rare books, despite Caresse's attempts to persuade him otherwise, and give them to waiters, barmen, and cab drivers; sometimes he would sneak them into antiquarian bookshops that lined the Seine with ridiculously low prices penciled into them.

The Black Sun Press also published the poetry of Archibald MacLeish, who had like Harry overturned the normal expectations of society, rejecting a career as a lawyer with one of Boston's best law firms and lecturing at Harvard. Harry offered to publish MacLeish's long poem Einstein in a deluxe edition, and paid MacLeish US$200 for his work. They printed 150 copies which were quickly sold.

In February 1929, Hart Crane arrived in Paris. He had received $2,000 from Arts patron Otto H. Kahn in 1928 to begin work on what became a book-length poem, The Bridge, but was frustrated at his lack of progress. He wore out his welcome at the home of his lover, Emil Opffer, and Crane left for Paris in early 1929. After he got to Paris, Harry offered him the use of the Crosby's country retreat, Le Moulin du Soleil, in Ermenonville, so he could concentrate on working on his poem. Crane spent several weeks there and roughed out a draft of the "Cape Hatteras" section, a key part of the epic poem. In late June that year, Crane returned from the south of France to Paris. Harry noted in his journal, "Hart C. back from Marseilles where he slept with his thirty sailors and he began again to drink Cutty Sark..." Crane, a heavy drinker since his early days in New York, got drunk at the Cafe Select and fought with waiters over his tab. When the Paris police were called, he fought with them and was beaten. They arrested and jailed him, fining him 800 francs. After six days in prison at La Santé, Harry Crosby paid Crane's fine and advanced him money for the passage back to the United States where he finally finished The Bridge.

In 1929, through bookstore owner Sylvia Beach, they contacted James Joyce and arranged to print three of his stories that had already appeared in translation. They named the new book Tales Told of Shem and Shaun (which was later integrated into Finnegans Wake), for which they paid Joyce US$2000 for 600 copies, unusually good pay for Joyce at that time. Their printer Roger Lescaret erred when setting the type, leaving the final page with only two lines. Rather than reset the entire book, he suggested to the Crosby's that they ask Joyce to write an additional eight lines to fill in the remainder of the page. Caresse refused, insisting that a literary master would never alter his work to fix a printer's error. Lescaret appealed directly to Joyce, who promptly wrote the eight lines requested. The first 100 copies of Joyce's book were printed on Japanese velum and signed by the author. It was hand-set in Caslon type and included an abstract portrait of Joyce by Constantin Brâncuși, a pioneer of modernist abstract sculpture. Brâncuși's drawings of Joyce became among the most popular images of him.

During the rest of 1929, they published fourteen works by Ernest Hemingway, James Joyce, René Crevel, T. S. Eliot, and Ezra Pound among others. Caresse wrote a book of poetry, Crosses of Gold, which they published. The Crosbys also published early works by newly emerging writers including Ramon Sartoris, Julien Levy, and Dorothy Parker.

== Beautiful books in limited editions ==
Cover from Transit of Venus, poetry written by Harry Crosby and published by Black Sun Press, in 1929.

The books they published were "beautifully bound, hand set books." One of their most beautiful books was the Hindu Love Manual which they first found while on holiday in Damascus. They reprinted it in October 1928 in a release of only 20 copies. Bound in navy blue leather, the cover was stamped with gold to reflect the style of ancient Persian manuscripts. The inside pages were printed on handmade paper colored a distinctive shade of gray and decorated with a gold border. Each illustration in every copy was hand-colored.

Illustration by Alastair from Harry Crosby's book Red Skeletons, published in 1927.

Their books were generally published in small numbers, usually less than 500 copies, sometimes as few as 10 or 20. They were "marked by clean lines, sharp typeface, and fine inks and papers." Some editions were published first as a "limited" edition, usually numbered and autographed, showcased with detailed design and costly materials, followed by a less expensive "trade" edition. Most were issued in slipcases. They published Les Liaisons Dangereuses with illustrations by Alastair. The cover was red-purple cloth with gilt lettering; it contained 14 engravings on color plates, with tissue guards, and numerous in-text illustrations.

In 1929, they published Harry Crosby's volume of verse, Mad Queen, which showed the influence of Surrealism and which included withering attacks on Bostonian tradition. Apart from his obsession with the sun, his writing increasingly contained references to dissolution and suicide. He viewed death as violent, quick, and liberating.

== Affair and suicide ==
On July 9, 1928, Harry met 20-year-old Josephine Noyes Rotch, ten years his junior, and began a troublesome affair with her. She had been known around Boston as "fast, a 'bad egg'...with a good deal of sex appeal." Josephine would inspire Crosby's next collection of poems which he dedicated to her, titled Transit of Venus. Josephine married Albert Smith Bigelow on June 21, 1929, but Harry and Josephine rekindled their affair within a few weeks. Unlike his wife Caresse, Josephine was quarrelsome and prone to fits of jealousy. She bombarded Harry with half incoherent cables and letters, anxious to set the date for their next tryst.

=== Visit to United States ===
In December 1929, the Crosbys returned to the United States for a visit and the Harvard-Yale football game. Harry and Josephine went to Detroit and checked into the expensive ($12 a day) Book-Cadillac Hotel as Mr. and Mrs. Harry Crane. For four days they took meals in their room, smoked opium, and had sex. On December 7 the lovers returned to New York. That evening Crosby's friend Hart Crane threw a party to celebrate his completion after seven years of his poem, The Bridge, which was to be published by the Black Sun Press, and to bid Harry and Caresse bon voyage, since they were due to sail back to France the next week. The party went on until nearly dawn, and Harry and Caresse made plans to see Crane again on December 10 to see the play Berkeley Square before they left for Europe.

On December 9, Josephine, who instead of returning to Boston had stayed with one of her bridesmaids in New York, sent a 36-line poem to Harry Crosby, who was staying with Caresse at the Savoy-Plaza Hotel. The last line of the poem read:

Death is our marriage.

On the same day, Harry Crosby wrote his final entry in his journal:

One is not in love unless one desires to die with one's beloved. There is only one happiness it is to love and to be loved.

=== Lovers found dead ===
On the evening of December 10, 1929, Harry was a no-show for dinner before the theater. Caresse called their friend Stanley Mortimer, whose studio Harry was known to use for his trysts. Stanley found Harry and Josephine's bodies. Harry had a .25 caliber bullet hole in his right temple and lay with his arm around Josephine, who had a matching hole in her left temple, in what appeared to be a suicide pact.

=== Scandal follows ===
The next day the headlines revealed all: Tragedy and Disgrace. As Josephine had died at least two hours before Harry, and there was no suicide note, newspapers ran articles for many days speculating about the murder or suicide pact. The New York Times front page blared, "COUPLE SHOT DEAD IN ARTISTS' HOTEL; Suicide Compact Is Indicated Between Henry Grew Crosby and Harvard Man's Wife. BUT MOTIVE IS UNKNOWN He Was Socially Prominent in Boston—Bodies Found in Friend's Suite." The New York newspapers decided it was a murder-suicide.

Harry's poetry possibly gave the best clue to his motives. Death was "the hand that opens the door to our cage the home we instinctively fly to." His manner of death mortified proper Boston society.

== Caresse continues publishing ==
After Harry Crosby's suicide, Caresse dedicated herself to the Black Sun Press. She published the first edition of Hart Crane's book-length poem The Bridge, replete with tipped-in photographs of the Brooklyn Bridge taken by Walker Evans, his public debut.

She followed that by releasing a "collected Crosby"—four books that reprinted earlier collections. One of these collections had been originally introduced by D. H. Lawrence. To accompany it, Caresse solicited essays for the other three from T. S. Eliot, Ezra Pound, and Stuart Gilbert. Caresse published two volumes of Harry Crosby's poetry, Chariot of the Sun and Transit of Venus. He had dedicated the latter volume to his lover, Josephine Rotch Bigelow.

In 1943, during the Second World War, she designed and published the first English-language edition of the surrealist collaboration between Max Ernst and Paul Éluard book, Misfortunes of the Immortals, first published in 1920. Translated by Hugh Chisholm, it featured newly added content, "Three Drawings Twenty Years Later", by Ernst. Due to limited availability of quality paper during wartime, it was printed by handset letterpress at the Gemor Press, on "exceptionally cheap wartime newsprint."

The Black Sun Press broadened its scope after Harry's death. Although it published few works after 1952, it printed James Joyce's Collected Poems in 1963. It did not officially close until Caresse's death on January 24, 1970 at age 78.

She had also established, with Jacques Porel, a side venture, Crosby Continental Editions, which published paperback books by European writers including Alain-Fournier, Charles-Louis Philippe, Antoine de Saint-Exupéry, Paul Éluard, George Grosz, Max Ernst, C. G. Jung and Americans like Ernest Hemingway, Dorothy Parker, William Faulkner, and Kay Boyle, among others. Her paperback books, an innovative product in the 1930s, were not well received, and she closed the press in 1933.

== Reputation ==
The Black Sun Press is not given much attention in literary history because of the relatively short time period during which they published, and because they were seen as "frivolous interlopers" in the serious world of literature, what antiquarian books expert and actor Neil Pearson and others have called dilettantes.

== Later value ==
Neil Pearson, an antiquarian books expert who specializes in the expatriate literary movement of Paris between the wars, commented, "If you’re interested in the best of what came out of Paris at that time, a Black Sun book is the literary equivalent of a Braque or a Picasso painting – except it’s a few thousand pounds, not 20 million."

The quality and rarity of the books published by the Black Sun Press places them in high demand by collectors. A first edition of The Bridge by Hart Crane in near fine condition was priced at USD$4,060 (about €4873) in 2010 by Royal Books. Only 100 copies were made when Editions Narcisse, later the Black Sun Press, printed in 1928 The Birthday of the Infanta by Oscar Wilde, with illustrations by Alastair. A fine copy was offered in New York during 2010 by Hugh Anson-Cartwright Fine Books for USD$4,680 (or about €5618).

A near-fine copy of the first English-language edition of Max Ernst's and Paul Eluard's book, Misfortunes of the Immortals, which Caresse published in 1943, was offered for sale in 2010 by Derringer Books for £2,187 (about €1818 or $1486).

In February 2014, a bookseller offered a copy of The Escaped Cock by D. H. Lawrence, signed by the author and dedicated "To John Vassos", for USD$2,500.

== Works ==
The Black Sun Press published the following works.

1927, 1928

- Edgar Allan Poe: The Fall of the House of Usher 1927. Published by Editions Narcisse.
- Oscar Wilde: L'Anniversaire de L'Infante (Birthday of the Infanta) 1928. Nine illustrations by Alastair Published by Editions Narcisse.
- D. H. Lawrence: Sun 1928. Drawing by Lawrence.

1929

- Kay Boyle: Short Stories 1929. Paris. First edition published by Editions Narcisse. Limited edition of 165 copies. 15 copies printed on Japanese paper and signed; 150 numbered copies on Holland Van Gelder Zonen paper.
- Robert Carlton Brown: 1450-1930 1929.
- Laurence Sterne: A Sentimental Journey Through France and Italy 1929. Illustrations by Polia Chentoff. Published by Editions Narcisse.
- Archibald MacLeish: Einstein 1929.
- Eugene Jolas: Secession in Astropolis 1929. Paris; New York. Limited edition of 135 copies.
- Choderlos De Laclos: Les Liaisons Dangereuses 1929. Illustrations by Alastair (Baron Hans Henning Voigt).
- Harry Crosby: Mad Queen 1929. Tirades; frontispiece by Caresse Crosby.
- Lord Lymington: Spring Song of Iscariot 1929.
- James Joyce: Tales Told of Shem and Shaun 1929. Three Fragments from Work in Progress (later Finnegans Wake).
- D. H. Lawrence: The Escaped Cock 1929 Limited edition of 50 printed on Japanese vellum, signed by Lawrence and the copy number written in longhand by him; with decorations in color by the author.
- Harry Crosby: Transit of Venus 1929. Paris. With a preface by T.S. Eliot. Limited edition of 570 copies printed by Harry Crosby from Dorique type. 20 lettered copies printed on Japanese vellum; 50 numbered copies on Holland paper; 500 copies on uncut Navarre.

1930

- Marcel Proust: 47 Lettres inedites a Walter Berry 1930. Proust's letters to Walter Van Rensselaer Berry (1859–1927). French and English.
- Lewis Carroll: Alice in Wonderland 1930. Included six full-page color lithographs by Marie Laurencin. Numbered limited edition of 350 copies on Rives printed for United States, with a total edition of 790.
- Ezra Pound: Imaginary Letters 1930. Paris. Limited edition of 375 copies. Fifty numbered and signed copies were printed on Japanese Vellum; 300 copies numbered 51-350 were printed on Navarre paper; and 25 copies hors de commerce.
- Archibald MacLeish; New Found Land 1930. Fourteen Poems.
- Harry Crosby: Shadows of the Sun 1930. Series Three.
- Hart Crane The Bridge 1930. Featured three photographs by Walker Evans, his debut. Paris. Limited edition of 283 copies, 200 numbered copies on Holland paper, 50 numbered copies on Japanese vellum signed by the author, 25 review copies hors commerce and, 8 special copies marked A to H.

1931, 1932

- René Crevel, Mr. Knife, Miss Fork 1931, featuring 19 full-page black and white engravings by Max Ernst. Limited edition of 50 numbered copies on Hollande paper signed by the authors, 200 copies on finest bristol paper, and 5 special copies.
- Caresse Crosby Poems for Harry Crosby 1931.
- Charles-Louis Philippe Bubu of Montparnasse 1932.
- Ernest Hemingway In Our Time 1932.
- William Faulkner Sanctuary 1932. Modern Masterpieces in English
- Raymond Radiguet The Devil in the Flesh 1932. Paris: Crosby Continental Editions. Translated by Kay Boyle, with an introduction by Aldous Huxley. Published by the Black Sun Press. Printed by F. Paillart, Paris.
- T. S. Eliot What Famous Authors Say About Crosby Editions 1932.
- Kay Boyle Year Before Last 1932.
- Robert McAlmon The Infinite Huntress and Other Stories 1932. Paris: Crosby Continental Editions. Modern Masterpieces in English, number 10. Published by the Black Sun Press and printed by F. Paillart, Paris-Abbeville.

1936–1950

- George Grosz: Interregnum. 1936. Introduction by John Dos Passos.
- James Joyce Collected Poems 1936. Reprinted in 1957 by Viking.
- Julien Levy: Surrealism 1936. With artwork by Joseph Cornell.
- Paul Eluard Misfortunes of Immortals 1943. Illustrated by Max Ernst. Handset in Sparten twelve point type and printed at the Gemar Press.
- Ramon Sartoris Three Plays 1944.
- Pietro Lazzari: Horses [1945]. 4 leaves of plates (art)
- Charles Bukowski Twenty Tanks from Kasseldown 1946 (broadside)
- Charles Olson: Y & X. Poems by Charles Olson, drawings by Corrado Cagli. Washington, D.C., 2nd edition, 1950.
