= Robert McAlmon =

American poet (1895–1956)

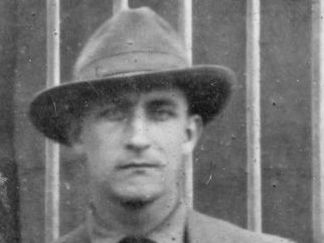
- McAlmon in 1923
- Born: Robert Menzies McAlmon; March 9, 1895; Clifton, Kansas, U.S.
- Died: February 2, 1956 (aged 60); Desert Hot Springs, California, U.S.
- Education: University of Minnesota; University of Southern California
- Occupations: Writer, poet, publisher
- Spouse: Annie Winifred Ellerman
- Writing career
- Pen name: Robert M. McAlmon

Robert Menzies McAlmon (also used Robert M. McAlmon, as his signature name, March 9, 1895 – February 2, 1956) was an American writer, poet, and publisher. In the 1920s, he founded in Paris the publishing house, Contact Editions, where he published Ernest Hemingway, Gertrude Stein, James Joyce and Ezra Pound.

== Life ==
McAlmon was born in Clifton, Kansas, the youngest of 10 children of an itinerant Presbyterian minister. He died in Desert Hot Springs, California, at age 60.

McAlmon studied for one semester as the University of Minnesota in 1916 before enlisting in the United States Army Air Corps in 1918. After World War I, he returned to university (1917–1920), this time at the University of Southern California. He attended classes intermittently until 1920, when he moved to Chicago and then New York City, where he worked as a nude model at an art school. Once in New York, he collaborated with William Carlos Williams on the Contact Review, which did not last for long but published poetry by Ezra Pound, Wallace Stevens, Marianne Moore, H.D., Kay Boyle, and Marsden Hartley.

The next year, he moved to Paris after marrying the wealthy English writer Annie Winifred Ellerman, better known as Bryher. This was a marriage of convenience which allowed Ellerman, a lesbian, to continue her relationship with Hilda Doolittle, and guarded McAlmon after he publicly identified himself as bisexual, stating: "I'm bisexual myself, like Michelangelo, and I don't give a damn who knows it." Ellerman divorced McAlmon in 1927.

McAlmon typed and edited the handwritten manuscript of Ulysses by James Joyce, with whom he had a friendship.

McAlmon became a prolific writer after the move, with many of his stories and poems based on his experiences as a youth in South Dakota.

== Contact editions ==
Having published his book of short stories A Hasty Bunch with James Joyce's printer Maurice Darantière in Dijon in 1922, he founded the Contact Publishing Company in 1923 using his father-in-law's money. Lasting until 1929, Contact Editions brought out books by Bryher (Two Selves), H. D.'s Palimpsest, Mina Loy's Lunar Baedeker, Ernest Hemingway's first book Three Stories & Ten Poems (1923), poems by Marsden Hartley, William Carlos Williams (Spring and All, 1923), Emanuel Carnevali's only book during his lifetime (The Hurried Man), prose by Ford Madox Ford, Gertrude Stein (The Making of Americans, 1925), Mary Butts (Ashe of Rings), John Herrmann (What Happens), Edwin Lanham (Sailors Don't Care), Robert Coates (The Eater of Darkness), Texas schoolteacher Gertrude Beasley's My First Thirty Years and Saikaku Ihara's Quaint Tales of Samurais. McAlmon paid for the publication of The Ladies Almanack by Djuna Barnes.

One of McAlmon's most important and best-received works is Village: As It Happened Through a Fifteen Year Period (1924) which presents a bleak portrait of an American town. The book shows his love for Eugene Vidal (Eugene Collins in the book), Gore Vidal's father, with whom he grew up in Madison, South Dakota, which is documented in Gore Vidal's mid-90s memoir, Palimpsest.

Other works include the short story collection A Companion Volume (1923), the autobiographical novel Post-Adolescence (1923), Distinguished Air (Grim Fairy Tales) (1925), the poetry collections The Portrait of a Generation (1926), and Not Alone Lost (1937), the 1,200 line epic poem North America, Continent of Conjecture (1929), and his memoir Being Geniuses Together: An Autobiography (1938).

McAlmon returned to the United States in 1940, residing in El Paso, Texas, where he sought treatment for a pulmonary ailment. He died at Desert Hot Springs, California, almost unknown in his native country, sixteen years later.

In the 1990s, Edward Lorusso brought out three volumes of McAlmon's fiction (many were first American publications), Village (1924, 1990), Post-Adolescence (1923, 1991), and Miss Knight and Others (1992), all through University of New Mexico Press. Edward Lorusso also published Naked Truth: The Fiction of Robert McAlmon in 2020.

McAlmon is heavily featured in the book Memoirs of Montparnasse by John Glassco about the golden age of Paris in the 1920s when writers and artists flocked to the city.

His social circle and friendship with Ernest Hemingway are discussed in the novel The Paris Wife by Paula McLain.

In 2007, his fictionalized memoir The Nightinghouls of Paris was published, based on the experiences of Glassco and his friend Graeme Taylor with McAlmon in Paris. The previously unpublished book was based on a typescript held by Yale's archives.

An epistolary novel about McAlmon's life in Greenwich Village, his expatriate adventures in Paris, and final years in California, Letters from Oblivion was published by Edward Lorusso in 2014.

== Bibliography ==
=== Fiction ===
- A Hasty Bunch. n.p., n.d. Printed by Maurice Darantière in Lyon in 1922. Short stories
- A Companion Volume. Contact, Paris 1923. Short stories
- Post-Adolescence. Contact, Paris 1923. Short stories
- Village: As It Happened Through a Fifteen Year Period. Contact, Paris 1924. Novel
- Distinguished Air: Grim Fairy Tales Contact, Paris 1925 [Photo-reprinted as There Was a Rustle of Black Silk Stockings. 1963]
- The Infinite Huntress and Other Stories. Black Sun Press, Paris 1932
- A Scarlet Pansy (under pseudonym Robert Scully), William Farro, Inc. (Roth), 1933
- Robert E. Knoll: McAlmon and the Lost Generation. A Self Portrait. University of Nebraska, Lincoln 1962.
- Miss Knight and Others. University of New Mexico Press, 1992
- The Nightinghouls of Paris. University of Illinois Press, 2007
- "La nuit pour adresse". Maud Simonnot (Paris: Editions Gallimard, 2017)

=== Memoirs ===
- Being Geniuses Together. Secker & Warburg, London 1938. Memoir
- Being Geniuses Together. Doubleday, New York 1968 (revised with supplementary chapters by Kay Boyle)

=== Poetry ===
- Explorations. Egoist Press, London 1921.
- The Portrait of a Generation. Contact, Paris 1925.
- North America, Continent of Conjecture. Contact, Paris 1929.
- Not Alone Lost. New Directions Publishing, Norfolk, CT, 1937.

== Legacy ==
William Saroyan wrote a short story about McAlmon in his 1971 book, Letters from 74 rue Taitbout or Don't Go But If You Must Say Hello To Everybody.

Charles Demuth painted a watercolor based on McAlmon's Distinguished Air: Grim Fairy Tales titled Distinguished Air.
