= Avalanche (novel) =

1944 novel by Kay Boyle

Avalanche: A Novel of Love and Espionage
- First edition
- Author: Kay Boyle
- Publisher: Simon & Schuster, New York. Faber & Faber, London.
- Publication date: 1944
- Media type: Print (hardback)
- Pages: 209

Avalanche: A Novel of Love and Espionage is a novel by Kay Boyle originally serialized in The Saturday Evening Post in 1943 and published in book form in 1944 by Simon & Schuster (New York) and Farrar & Straus (London).

Avalanche was Boyle's only work to become a bestseller.

The novel is notable for the scathing critique it elicited from Edmund Wilson, author and literary critic at The New Yorker.

== Publication history ==
Avalanche was serialized by The Saturday Evening Post in seven consecutive weekly issues running from October 23, 1943, to December 4, 1943.

The serial was published as a stand-alone novel in 1944 by Simon & Schuster (New York) and Farrar, Straus and Giroux (London).

== Historical context ==
Literary critic Eric Keenaghan notes that Boyles’ witnessing of events surrounding the 1938 Anschluss in Austria served as a catalyst to her emerging anti-Fascist “political and social conscience." At the time Avalanche appeared as a serial in The Saturday Evening Post, Boyle had just returned to America after serving as a journalist in the European theater of World War II touring U.S. air bases and observing Germany's V-2 bombing of London. That Boyle penned a romance novel—and that she sought to see it published in a popular and widely read periodical—was a measure of her determination to enlist the sympathy of Americans in the allied war effort. Kennaghan writes:

Beginning with Avalanche, Boyle extended how her fiction addresses world events by also reassessing literary markets’ usefulness for reaching broader readerships…Having written this genre novel to make Americans conscious of conditions in occupied Europe, she also knowingly appealed to the sensibilities of popular magazines’ acquisition editors and audiences.”

Critic Harry T. Moore in The Kenyon Review describes the fallout from Boyle's decision to adapt her writing to the popular "slicks":

Kay Boyle began bending her high talent to the production of the fictional fudge of Saturday Evening Post serials, with results that were unsatisfactory from the point of view of her early admirers - and probably the readers of popular magazines were not very much pleased either, since a certain amount of subtlety remained amid the melodramatic scenes. In 1944, at a time when Edmund Wilson was exerting great influence with his New Yorker causeries, he came upon one of Kay Boyle's serials, Avalanche, published as a book, and he brought a weight of ridicule down on it…this essay has continued to damage Kay Boyle's reputation across the years.

== Reception ==
A Time magazine reviewer described Avalanche as “a spectacular melodrama, sometimes tautened into Hitchcocky thrills: "Mocking the novel’s dialogue, Time accuses Boyle of abandoning her “complex, erratic and usually perverse characters” and substituting pulp-fiction-like effects."

A critic at Kirkus Reviews approved of Boyle’s populist approach to story-telling in Avalanche, calling the novel “a masterpiece of poetic prose, sparse, sure, but sacrificing nothing of pace, suspense, or emotional quality in the process.”

New York Times reviewer Orville Prescott dubbed the novel as “a de luxe spy story”—genuine in its hatred of Nazi terror and its collaborators, equally genuine in its praise for those risking the ultimate sacrifice in defying it. Avalanche, Prescott adds, “is not intended to be taken seriously as fiction.”

== Author’s appraisal ==
In a 1970 interview with biographer Irv Broughton, Kay Boyle placed Avalanche within the context of the allied war effort and its practical value to combat troops operating in the European theater:

[Avalanche] was on the best seller list as a hardcover book, then it sold in paperback to the armed forces services during the war, 250,000 [to] 350,000 copies. Part of the reason they wanted it in the armed services was because it did give a very exact view of what was happening in France at that time, and it was very useful to American flying men who had to parachute over France. They could use it as a handbook, more or less, about who would be their friends and who would not.

== The Edmund Wilson review: retrospective assessment ==
“I picked up Kay Boyle’s Avalanche in hopes of finding a novel worth reading, and have been somewhat taken aback by to get nothing but a piece of pure rubbish.”—Critic Edmund Wilson in his January 15, 1944 review of Avalanche.

New Yorker literary critic Edmund Wilson’s 1944 review of Avalanche is widely regarded as a severe blow to Boyle’s reputation as a literary stylist.

Literary critic Eric Keenaghan, in the Journal of Narrative Theory, writes: “Infamously, Edmund Wilson panned Avalanche in The New Yorker, denouncing it as "nothing but a piece of pure rubbish" and chauvinistically condemning Boyle for deploying "the idiom of a feminized Hemingway."

Critic Regina Marlerat of the Los Angeles Times considers Wilson's review “the death knell for Kay Boyle’s reputation as a writer of merit.” The New Yorker, in which Boyle's short fiction had appeared frequently during the 1930s and 1940s, began rejecting her work in 1944, and ceased accepting her manuscripts altogether by the early 1950s.

New York Times critic Pritchard, William H. notes the decisive impact of Wilson's review on Boyle:

[B]y the 50's her reputation, which had peaked around 1942 when she was one of our best-known writers, had gone into decline. (Edmund Wilson's savaging of her 1944 novel, Avalanche, was instrumental in that reversal.)

Henry T. Moore questions the justice of Boyle's declining reputation with regard to her post-Avalanche fiction, in particular her 1951 collection The Smoking Mountain: Stories of Postwar Germany:

[I]t should have risen again with The Smoking Mountain, her first book about Germany, which came out in 1951. This collection of stories and sketches was certainly the finest volume of fiction written by an American, up to that time, about Europe after the war.

== Sources ==
- Bell, Elizabeth S. 1992. Kay Boyle: A Study of the Short Fiction. Twayne Publishers, New York. Twayne's Studies in Short Fiction Series No. 34. Gordon Weaver, General Editor. ISBN 0-8057-8317-2
- Boyle, Kay. 1944. Avalanche: A Novel of Love and Espionage. Simon & Schuster, New York. Faber & Faber, London.
- Broughton, Irv. 1989. The Writer's Mind: Interviews With American Authors. pp. 105–130. University of Arkansas Press, Fayetteville, Arkansas. ISBN 978-1557280985 in Kay Boyle: A Study of the Short Fiction. Twayne Publishers, New York. pp. 101–108. Twayne's Studies in Short Fiction Series No. 34. Gordon Weaver, General Editor. ISBN 0-8057-8317-2
- Keenaghan, Eric. 2018. “The Political Experiment of "Pot-Boylers": Thinking, Feeling, and Romance in Kay Boyle's Resistance Thriller Avalanche’" Journal of Narrative Theory, Vol. 48, No. 3, Women's Experimental Forms (Fall 2018), pp. 339-377 Published by JNT https://www.jstor.org/stable/45095529 Accessed 24 March 2026.
- Marler, Regina. 1994. “Typed Until 3 a.m.” Review of biographer Joan Mellen’s Kay Boyle: Author of Herself. Los Angeles Times, August 7, 1994. https://www.latimes.com/archives/la-xpm-1994-08-07-bk-24279-story.html Accessed 26 March 2026.
- Moore, Harry T. 1951. “In Germany the Ruins Still Smolder.” New York Times, April 22, 1951 https://www.nytimes.com/1951/04/22/archives/in-germany-the-ruins-still-smolder.html Accessed 10 April 2026 in Kay Boyle: A Study of the Short Fiction. Twayne Publishers, New York. pp. 144–146. Twayne's Studies in Short Fiction Series No. 34. Gordon Weaver, General Editor. ISBN 0-8057-8317-2
- Moore, Harry T.. 1960. “Review: Kay Boyle's Fiction Reviewed Work(s): Generation without Farewell by Kay Boyle.” The Kenyon Review, Spring, 1960, Vol. 22, No. 2 (Spring, 1960), pp. 323–326. Published by: Kenyon College. https://www.jstor.org/stable/4334035 Accessed 24 March 2026.
- Prescott, Orville. 1944. Books of the Times. New York Times, January 14, 1944. https://www.nytimes.com/1944/01/14/archives/books-of-the-times.html Accessed 31 March 2026.
- Pritchard, William H.. 1994. “For Kay Boyle, Nothing Succeeded Like Excess.” New York Times, May 1, 1994.https://www.nytimes.com/1994/05/01/books/for-kay-boyle-nothing-succeeded-like-excess.html Accessed 31 March 2026.
- Wilson, Edmund. 1944. “Kay Boyle and The Saturday Evening Post.” The New Yorker, January 15, 1944. In Classics and Commercials: A Literary Chronicle of the Forties. 1950. Farrar, Straus, New York. ISBN 9780374600266 https://www.newyorker.com/magazine/1944/01/15/1944-01-15-074-tny-cards-000016703 Accessed 31 March 2026.
