= Letters from 74 rue Taitbout =

Letters from 74 rue Taitbout or Don't Go But If You Must Say Hello To Everybody
- Author: William Saroyan
- Language: English
- Publisher: World Publishing Company
- Publication date: January 1969
- Publication place: United States
- Media type: Print (Hardback)

Letters from 74 Rue Taitbout or Don't Go But If You Must Say Hello To Everybody is a book of short stories in the form of letters by William Saroyan that was published in 1969. The stories often recollect meetings, relationships, observations, ask questions and wonder what happened to some of the people from Saroyan's past.

== Contents of the book ==
1. "To The Only One"
2. "Armenak of Bitlis"
3. "Dr. Freud, Dr. Jung, and Dr. Adler"
4. "Hovagim Saroyan"
5. "Calouste Gulbenkian"
6. "Guy de Maupassant"
7. "The Match Girl"
8. "Prof-Kalfayan"
9. "Sammy Isaacs"
10. "Al Devarine"
11. "Samuel L. Clemens"
12. "Dikran Saroyan"
13. "Joe Gould"
14. "Miss Carmichael, Miss Thompson, Miss Brockington, Miss Clifford, Miss Chambers"
15. "Honoré de Balzac"
16. "Sam Catanzaro"
17. "Vahan Minasian"
18. "Geoffrey Faber"
19. "Robert McAlmon"
20. "Lawrence Colt"
21. "Yeghishe Charentz"
22. "Adolf Hitler"
23. "Carl Sandburg"
24. "Emory L. Ralston"
25. "Dr. Harold Fraser"
26. "Benito Mussolini"
27. "The Lion of Judah"
28. "Jacob Ahbood"
29. "Dr. Anoushavan Chomp"
30. "L. B. Mayer"
31. "Anybody"
