= Monica Poole =

British wood engraver

- Born: 20 May 1921; Canterbury
- Died: 3 August 2003; Tonbridge
- Occupations: Illustrator, graphic artist, wood engraver

Monica Poole (20 May 1921−3 August 2003) was a British wood engraver.

== Biography ==
Monica Poole was the daughter of Charles Reginald Poole and Gladys Aline Haskell. She was born 20 May 1921 in Kent and died on 3 August 2003. She lived in Kent for the greater part of her life, and according to Anne Stevens "found her subjects, and shapes in the rolling chalk downland, the lush wealden country and the shore line".

She attended Abbotsford School, then Broadstairs, and joined the Thanet School of Art at Margate in 1938, where she was introduced to wood-engraving by Geoffrey Wales.

During the Second World War, between 1940 and 1945, she worked in an aircraft factory in Bedford. She spent the post-war years from 1945 to 1949 at the Central School of Arts and Crafts in London. Here she met Noel Rooke, a noted wood-engraver. It was John Farleigh's course on illustrating, though, that revealed and nurtured her talent for wood-engraving. In 1940 she had first seen and been inspired by Farleigh's illustrations for D.H. Lawrence's The Man Who Died (1935), which led to the idea of studying under him. She later, in 1985, produced a study "The Wood Engravings of John Farleigh".

She married widower Alastair George Murison Small (1896–1969), a member of the Smalls of Dirnanean, in 1952. Murison Small was a former naval officer who had designed underwater weaponry. On his death on 14 September 1969, Poole retired to Tonbridge and quiet seclusion.

Poole produced some 36 wood-engravings from 1977 to 1993, which were snapped up by discerning collectors. She had solo exhibitions at the London dealer Duncan Campbell in 1989 and 1993. She exhibited regularly with the Royal Society of Painter-Etchers and Engravers, becoming an Associate in 1967 and a member in 1975. She was also a member of the Society of Wood Engravers and the Art Workers Guild.

Her work may be seen in the Ashmolean Museum in Oxford, the Fitzwilliam Museum in Cambridge, the Victoria and Albert Museum, the British Museum in London, the Scottish National Gallery of Modern Art in Edinburgh, the Boston Public Library and in many other collections. Her close friend and fellow wood-engraver, George Mackley, published a book on her prints in 1994.

She was a reserved person and led a very private life. She contracted poliomyelitis at the age of six months, leaving her paraplegic until she was five years old. Further emotional scars followed with her elder sister's death at seven and her mother's suffering from tuberculosis. An extended stay in Switzerland between 1929 and 1931 aided in her mother's recovery and left Monica dazzled by the mountainous country.

== Bibliography ==
- Monica Poole, The Wood Engravings of John Farleigh (1985. Gresham Press)
- George Mackley, Monica Poole Wood Engraver (1984. Florin Press, Biddenden)
- Monica Poole, George Mackley Wood Engraver (1981. Gresham Press)
- Monica Poole, Monica Poole Wood Engraver by Anne Stevens with a note by Monica Poole (1993. Ashmolean Museum, Oxford)
