= Alastair (artist) =

Illustration from Harry Crosby's book Red Skeletons published in 1927

Hans Henning Otto Harry Baron von Voigt (20 October 1887 – 30 October 1969), best known by his nickname Alastair, was a German artist, composer, dancer, mime, poet, singer and translator.

== Biography ==
Hans Henning Baron von Voight was born of German nobility in Karlsruhe. In his youth he joined a circus and learned mime. Shortly after leaving school he studied philosophy at Marburg University where he met the writer Boris Pasternak. He was self-taught as an artist, and he was also a proficient dancer and pianist.

For a time he lived at Versailles, and from there carried on an extensive correspondence with his sometime lover Richard Thoma, including alluding to his other liaisons: "I only rushed away for a couple of hours to meet somebody at midnight under the blue elm. My happenings are sad to say often in this bad taste."

He died in Munich in 1969.

== Art ==
He is best known as an illustrator, under the pen name "Alastair". His career as an artist was begun in 1914, when John Lane published Forty-Three Drawings by Alastair.

His drawings, which are often decadent in spirit and have the look of Art Nouveau, are influenced somewhat by the drawings of the English artist Aubrey Beardsley, who illustrated works by Oscar Wilde, as Alastair would later do. His ‘serpentine line’ often depicts characters whose outlines are lightly drawn with the main areas filled in with ‘broken dotted lines’. His drawings were in black and white ink, sometimes with one colour added. Alastair's illustrations show a strong influence from the Decadent movement in art and poetry that had begun decades earlier, with the "perverse and sinister" a recurring theme. Intricate decorative elements and fine detail are apparent in his works.

Alastair’s fame spread in 1920 with the publication of Wilde's The Sphinx, which contained ten full-page illustrations by him, ‘printed in black and turquoise’. Many of his drawings were inspired by the poems of Wilde, and in 1922 Alastair would illustrate a book of Wilde’s play Salome.

Other books containing Alastair's illustrations include:

- The Blind Bow-Boy (1923) by Carl Van Vechten,
- Fifty Drawings by Alastair (1925)
- Red Skeletons by Harry Crosby (1928) (published by the Black Sun Press)
- "The Fall of the House of Usher" by Edgar Allan Poe (1928 edition, published by the Black Sun Press)
- Les Liaisons dangereuses by Choderlos de Laclos (1929)
- Manon Lescaut Translated from the French of Abbé Prevost by D. C. Moylan with Eleven Illustrations by Alastair and an Introduction by Arthur Symons (1928) (John Lane / Dodd, Mead : London & New York, 1928.)
- The Birthday of the Infanta by Oscar Wilde (1928 published by the Black Sun Press)

In The Blind Bow-Boy Alastair depicted the ‘androgynous male’.

Alastair had at least two public exhibitions of his works during his lifetime, at the Leicester Galleries in 1914 and at the Weyhe Gallery in New York in 1925.

During the 1930s, he stopped drawing, only to resume in 1964.
