= The Youngest Camel =

1939 book by Kay Boyle

- First edition
- Author: Kay Boyle
- Cover artist: Fritz Kredel
- Publisher: Little, Brown and Company
- Publication date: August, 1939
- Media type: Print (hardback)
- Pages: 96

The Youngest Camel is a children’s book by Kay Boyle published in 1939 by Little, Brown and Company (Boston) and Faber & Faber (London).In this coming-of-age story, only anthropomorphic animal species of North Africa appear as speaking characters in the story.

Boyle wrote an updated version of the story entitled The Youngest Camel Reconsidered and Rewritten in 1959, published by Harper & Brothers (New York) and Faber & Faber (London).

== Plot ==
“The Youngest Camel” is told from a third-person omniscient point-of-view and set somewhere in North Africa.

A young Dromedary camel frolics as he follows behind his mother, unburdened and ignorant of the life that awaits him as a caravan camel.

The little camel is susceptible to almost any misinformation to which he is exposed, and rejects the most sage advice. His mother tries unsuccessfully to disabuse him of his ignorance; her attitude towards her child alternates between tenderness and exasperation.Resting at an oasis, she gently informs her son that he will soon face an ordeal: Camel drivers will separate him from her and tether him alone in a remote desert location for three days. If he survives the excruciating ordeal he will begin his training to qualify as a caravan camel.

The next day, the little camel declares that he has found a bejeweled necklace in the sand made of topaz, emerald, ruby, opal, topaz and diamond. Each bears an inscription that he reads to his mother; they apparently are talismen that predict good fortune for the bearer. The mother becomes enthralled by her child’s discovery. But when she demands to see the artifact that evening, the little camel confesses that the necklace exists only in his imagination: “I made it up so you would forget about the heat, so perhaps that isn’t quite so bad as lying.” The mother weeps in despair for her son.

That evening the little camel is led away by two camel drivers. He is bound and left to face a crisis of loneliness. He screams and struggles to free himself. In time he enters a trance, uttering the words “Music’s invisible, memory’s invisible, love’s invisible…Even hope’s invisible, but it must be there just the same—” At that instant a figure appears who introduces himself as one of the sons of Mohammed; the apparition appears in the form of a handsome youth. His duty is to preside over the camels who are struggling to survive their isolation. The good-natured Mohammed directs the young camel to follow the sun to a distance oasis near Aqsu and to repeat the sacred word: P-e-r-n-o-d: Power Eternal Reigns Near Our Dreams.

"“It’s much wiser to be polite to everyone I meet, because one never knows.”

As the little camel hurries toward his destination he sees a mirage and changes course, congratulating himself on ignoring Mohammed’s instructions. A group of herons passing overhead ass ure him that he has lost his way and encourage him to follow them to the oasis, as do a flock of flamingos: the little camel indignantly shuns them. Nearing exhaustion, the camel begins to reflect: “I haven’t made any mistakes yet in my life…I can’t think of a single time I’ve been wrong.” At this, dozens of tiny, colorful birds shriek with laughter. They begin to reprimand the dismayed camel for being untruthful to his mother, for his conceitedness, and for his stupidity in ignoring the wise young Mohammed: “You were always a coward except when you were with your mother.” Now hopelessly lost, he comes upon two vultures feeding on a carcass. When the little camel asks for directions to the oasis, they mock his ignorance. He flees in panic when he realizes that they anticipate eating him if he dies. A gigantic wind storm approaches. The spirits of the sand inform the little camel that the only way to survive the overwhelming power of the wind is to submit to it: “When you find the pathway between the winds, you will be saved…Believe in us. We will show you the way.”

As the storm subsides, the little camel finds himself in an lovely oasis. From a nearby silken tent comes a voice that congratulates him on surviving the three-day ordeal; the voice is that of an ancient camel patriarch. In admitting his own weakness of character, the little camel begins to transition to the world of reality and away from self-delusion. The little camel is further instructed on how to resist temptation and to obey the spirits of the desert. He demonstrates his new-found maturity and ceases to lie. The magic necklace is restored to him and he is finally reunited with his mother:

[B]y the time he reached his mother and was clasped in her arms, all the lies he had ever told her had been transformed to truth.

== Reception ==
In 1939, literary critic Edmund Wilson expressed dismay when he discovered that children's stories had recently been written by a number major modernist writers, among them Stein, Eliot, Kay Boyle and Cummings.

It is perhaps worth pointing out that there seems to be something like a general tendency on the part of the more “difficult” writers to go in for children’s books. Kay Boyle has done a book about a camel; and E. E. Cummings is rumored to be engaged in a book of fairy-tales. I don’t know what this means—except that they evidently do not feel at the moment that they have anything better to do.

== Sources ==
- Bell, Elizabeth S. 1992. Kay Boyle: A Study of the Short Fiction. Twayne Publishers, New York. ISBN 0-8057-8317-2
- Curnutt, Kirk. 2000. The Critical Response to Gertrude Stein. Greenwood Publishing Group. ISBN 978-0313304750
- Boyle, Kay. 1939. The Youngest Camel. Little, Brown and Company, New York. Gutenberg reproduction available in public domain: https://www.gutenberg.org/cache/epub/64988/pg64988-images.html Credits: Tim Lindell, David E. Brown, and the Online Distributed Proofreading Team at https://www.pgdp.net (This book was produced from images made available by the HathiTrust Digital Library.). Accessed 4 April, 2026.
- Phillips, Michelle H. 2016. Representations of Childhood in American Modernism. Palgrave Macmillan, New York. ISBN 978-1-137-50806-5. https://ndl.ethernet.edu.et/bitstream/123456789/10884/1/76.pdf Accessed 04 April, 2026.
