= John Farleigh =

British artist

John Farleigh CBE
- Born: 16 June 1900
- Died: 30 March 1965
- Occupations: Exlibrist, graphic artist, artist, illustrator

John Farleigh CBE (16 June 1900 – 30 March 1965), also known as Frederick William Charles Farleigh, was an English wood-engraver, noted for his illustrations of George Bernard Shaw's work The Adventures of the Black Girl in Her Search for God, which caused controversy when released due to the religious, sexual and racial themes within the writing and John Farleigh's complementary (and risqué) wood engravings commissioned by Shaw for the book. He is also known for his illustrations of D. H. Lawrence's work, The Man Who Died, and for the posters he designed for London County Council Tramways and London Transport. He was also a painter, lithographer, author and art tutor.

== Life ==
Farleigh left school at 14 and enlisted as an apprentice at the Artists' Illustrators Agency in London, applying himself to lettering, wax engravings and black and white drawings, intended for advertising. He also attended drawing classes at the Bolt Court Technical School. In 1918 he was conscripted into the army and served until peace was declared in November of the same year. He resumed his apprenticeship and was awarded a government grant enabling him to enroll for three years at the London County Council Central School of Arts and Crafts (later the Central School of Art and Design). The teaching staff included Bernard Meninsky and Noel Rooke who trained him in wood-engraving. Between 1922 and 1925 Farleigh was an art master at Rugby School, thereafter returning to London and assuming a post at the Central School of Arts and Crafts, where he taught antique and still-life drawing and later, illustration. Here he tutored some extremely talented wood-engravers, including Monica Poole.

In 1940 Farleigh was appointed as chairman of the Arts and Crafts Exhibition Society (now the Society of Designer Craftsmen). In 1946 the Society, in cooperation with the Red Rose Guild, the Senefelder Club, the Society of Wood-Engravers and the Society of Scribes and Illuminators, formed the Crafts Centre of Great Britain (now Contemporary Applied Arts). Farleigh was chairman of the centre from 1950 until 1964.

In 1941 the British Council commissioned him to design the title page of the catalogue for the Exhibition of Modern British Crafts. The writer and illustrator Judith Kerr said that he was the person who taught her most when she was doing evening classes at St Martin's School of Art during the war.

Farleigh's work was widely exhibited - Leicester Galleries, Manchester City Art Gallery, Royal Society of Painter-Etchers and Engravers, Royal Scottish Academy and Cooling and Sons Gallery. His wood-engravings appeared in the 1925 Golden Cockerel Press edition of Selected Essays by The Reverend Jonathan Swift and in the books published by the Shakespeare Head Press in the late 1920s. He was elected an Associate of the Royal Society of Painter-Printmakers in 1937 and a full member in 1948. His work was also part of the painting event in the art competition at the 1948 Summer Olympics.
