= Kay Boyle =

American poet (1902–1992)

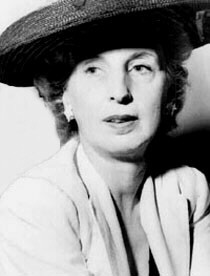
- Born: Katherine Evans Boyle; February 19, 1902; St. Paul, Minnesota, U.S.
- Died: December 27, 1992 (aged 90); Mill Valley, California, U.S.
- Spouses: Richard Brault (m. 1922–1932); Laurence Vail (m. 1932–1943); Baron Joseph von Franckenstein (m. 1943; died 1963)
- Partner: Ernest Walsh (1926)
- Children: 6

Kay Boyle (February 19, 1902 – December 27, 1992) was an American novelist, short story writer, educator, and political activist. Boyle is best known for her fiction, which often explored the intersections of personal and political themes. Her work contributed significantly to modernist literature, and she was an active participant in the expatriate literary scene in Paris during the 1920s. She was a Guggenheim Fellow and O. Henry Award winner.

== Early years ==
The granddaughter of a publisher, Boyle was born in St. Paul, Minnesota, and grew up in several cities but principally in Cincinnati, Ohio. She had one sibling, an elder sister, Joan (1900–1993), later Mrs. Detweiler. Their father, Howard Peterson Boyle, was a lawyer, and their mother was Katherine (Evans) Boyle, a literary and social activist who believed the wealthy had an obligation to help the financially less fortunate. In later years, Kay Boyle championed integration and civil rights. She advocated banning nuclear weapons, and American withdrawal from the Vietnam War.

Boyle was educated at the exclusive Shipley School in Bryn Mawr, Pennsylvania, then studied architecture at the Ohio Mechanics Institute in Cincinnati. Interested in the arts, she studied violin at the Cincinnati Conservatory of Music before settling in New York City in 1922 where she found work as a writer/editor with a small magazine.

== Marriages and family life ==
That same year, she met and married a French exchange student, Richard Brault, and they moved to France in 1923. This resulted in her staying in Europe for the better part of the next twenty years. Separated from her husband, she formed a relationship with magazine editor Ernest Walsh, with whom she had a daughter, Sharon, named for the Rose of Sharon, in March 1927, five months after Walsh's death from tuberculosis in October 1926.

In 1928 she met Laurence Vail, who was then married to Peggy Guggenheim. Boyle and Vail lived together between 1929 until 1932 when, following their divorces, they married. With Vail, she had three more children - daughters Apple-Joan in 1929, Kathe in 1934, and Clover in 1939. During her years in France, Boyle was associated with several innovative literary magazines and made friends with many of the writers and artists living in Paris around Montparnasse. Among her friends were Harry and Caresse Crosby who owned the Black Sun Press and published her first work of fiction, a collection titled Short Stories. They became such good friends that in 1928 Harry Crosby cashed in some stock dividends to help Boyle pay for an abortion. Other friends included Eugene and Maria Jolas. Boyle also wrote for transition, one of the preeminent literary publications of the day. A poet as well as a novelist, her early writings often reflected her lifelong search for true love as well as her interest in the power relationships between men and women. Boyle's short stories won two O. Henry Awards.

In 1936, she wrote a novel, Death of a Man, an attack on the growing threat of Nazism. In 1943, following her divorce from Laurence Vail, she married Baron Joseph von Franckenstein, with whom she had two children - Faith in 1942 and Ian in 1943. After having lived in France, Austria, England, and in Germany after World War II, Boyle returned to the United States.

== McCarthyism, later life ==
In the States, Boyle and her husband were victims of early 1950s McCarthyism. Her husband was dismissed by Roy Cohn from his post in the Public Affairs Division of the United States Department of State, and Boyle lost her position as foreign correspondent for The New Yorker, a post she had held for six years. She was blacklisted by most of the major magazines. During this period, her life and writing became increasingly political.

She and her husband were cleared by the United States Department of State in 1957.

In the early 1960s, Boyle and her husband lived in Rowayton, Connecticut, where he taught at a private girls' school. He was then rehired by the State Department and posted to Iran, but died shortly thereafter in 1963.

Boyle was a writer in residence at the New York City Writer's Conference at Wagner College in 1962. In 1963, she accepted a creative writing position on the faculty of San Francisco State College, where she remained until 1979.

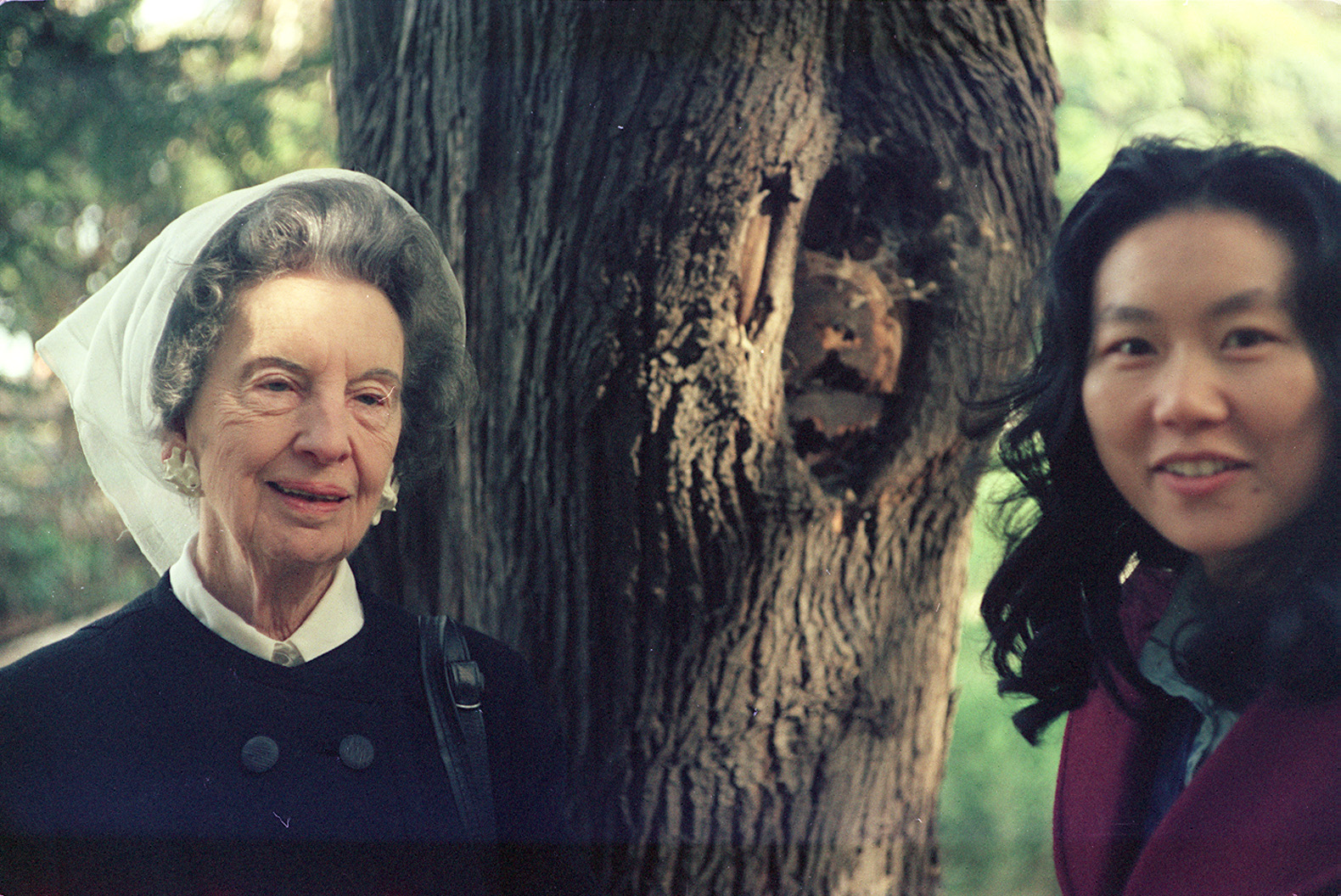
Kay Boyle with Bay Area historian Connie Young Yu in San Francisco, 1976.

During this period she became heavily involved in political activism. She traveled to Cambodia in 1966 as part of the "Americans Want to Know" fact-seeking mission. She participated in protests, and in 1967 was arrested twice and imprisoned. In 1968, she signed the "Writers and Editors War Tax Protest" pledge, vowing to refuse tax payments in protest against the Vietnam War. In her later years, she became an active supporter of Amnesty International and worked for the NAACP. After retiring from San Francisco State College, Boyle briefly held writer-in-residence positions, including at Eastern Washington University in Cheney and the University of Oregon in Eugene.

She was one of the signatories of the agreement to convene a convention for drafting a world constitution. As a result, for the first time in history, a World Constituent Assembly convened to draft and adopt the Constitution for the Federation of Earth.

Boyle died at a retirement community in Mill Valley, California on December 27, 1992.

== Legacy ==
In her lifetime, Kay Boyle published more than 40 books, including 14 novels, eight volumes of poetry, 11 collections of short fiction, three children's books, and French to English translations and essays. Most of her papers and manuscripts are in the Morris Library at Southern Illinois University in Carbondale, Illinois. Morris Library has the Ruby Cohn Collection of Kay Boyle Letters and the Alice L. Kahler Collection of Kay Boyle Letters. A comprehensive assessment of Boyle's life and work was published in 1986 titled Kay Boyle, Artist and Activist by Sandra Whipple Spanier. In 1994 Joan Mellen published a voluminous biography of Kay Boyle, Kay Boyle: Author of Herself.

A member of the American Academy of Arts and Letters, in addition to her two O. Henry Awards, she received two Guggenheim Fellowships and in 1980 received the National Endowment for the Arts fellowship for "extraordinary contribution to American literature over a lifetime of creative work".

== Bibliography ==
=== Novels ===
- Process (written in 1925, published by University of Illinois Press in 2001)
- Plagued by the Nightingale (Jonathan Cape and Harrison Smith, 1931)
- Year Before Last (Harrison Smith, 1932)
- Gentlemen, I Address You Privately (Harrison Smith and Robert Haas, 1933)
- My Next Bride (Harcourt, Brace and Co, 1934)
- Death of a Man (Harcourt, Brace and Co, 1936)
- Yellow Dusk by Bettina Bedwell (ghostwritten by Kay Boyle) (1937)
- Monday Night (Harcourt, Brace and Co, 1938)
- The Crazy Hunter: Three Short Novels (Harcourt, Brace and Co, 1940). Includes The Crazy Hunter, The Bridegroom's Body, and Big Fiddle.
- Primer for Combat (Simon and Schuster, 1942)
- Avalanche (Simon and Schuster, 1944)
- A Frenchman Must Die (Simon and Schuster, 1946)
- 1939 (Simon and Schuster, 1948)
- His Human Majesty (McGraw-Hill, 1949)
- The Seagull on the Step (Knopf, 1955)
- Three Short Novels (Beacon Press, 1958). Includes The Crazy Hunter,The Bridegroom's Body, and Decision.
- Generation Without Farewell (Knopf, 1960)
- The Underground Woman (Doubleday, 1975)

=== Story collections ===
- Short Stories (Black Sun Press, 1929)
- Wedding Day and Other Stories (Jonathan Cape and Harrison Smith, 1930)
- The First Lover and Other Stories (Harrison Smith and Robert Haas, 1933)
- The White Horses of Vienna and Other Stories (Harcourt, Brace and Co, 1936). The title story was winner of the 1935 O. Henry Award.
- Thirty Stories (Simon and Schuster, 1946). Includes "Defeat", winner of the 1941 O. Henry Award.
- The Smoking Mountain: Stories of Postwar Germany (McGraw-Hill, 1951)
- Nothing Ever Breaks Except the Heart (Doubleday, 1966)
- Fifty Stories (Doubleday, 1980)
- Life Being the Best and Other Stories (New Directions, 1988)

=== Juvenile ===
- The Youngest Camel (Little, Brown, 1939). Revised edition published as The Youngest Camel: Reconsidered and Rewritten (1959).
- Pinky, the Cat Who Liked to Sleep (Crowell-Collier, 1966)
- Pinky in Persia (Crowell-Collier, 1968)

=== Poetry collections ===
- A Statement (1932)
- A Glad Day (1938)
- American Citizen: Naturalized in Leadville (1944)
- Collected Poems (1962)
- The Lost Dogs of Phnom Pehn (1968)
- Testament for My Students and Other Poems (1970)
- A Poem for February First (1975)
- This Is Not a Letter and Other Poems (1985)
- Collected Poems of Kay Boyle (Copper Canyon Press, 1991)

=== Non-fiction ===
- Relations & Complications. Being the Recollections of H.H. The Dayang Muda of Sarawak. (1929), Forew. by T.P. O'Connor (Gladys Milton Brooke) (ghost-written)
- Breaking the Silence: Why a Mother Tells Her Son about the Nazi Era (1962)
- The Last Rim of The World in "Why Work Series" (1966)
- Being Geniuses Together, 1920-1930 (1968; with Robert McAlmon)
- Winter Night and a conversation with the author in New Sounds In American Fiction (1969)
- The Long Walk at San Francisco State and Other Essays (1970)
- Four Visions of America (1977; with others)
- Words That Must Somehow Be Said (edited by Elizabeth Bell; 1985)

=== Translations ===
- Don Juan, by Joseph Delteil (New York: Jonathan Cape and Harrison Smith, 1931)
- Mr Knife, Miss Fork, by René Crevel (Paris: Black Sun Press, 1931). A fragment of Babylon translated into English.
- The Devil in the Flesh, by Raymond Radiguet (Paris: Crosby Continental Editions, 1932)
- Babylon, by René Crevel (San Francisco: North Point Press, 1985)

=== Short fiction ===
Title	Publication	Collected in
"Passeres' Paris"	This Quarter 1.1 (Spring 1925)	-
"Flight"	This Quarter 1.2 (Autumn 1925-Winter 1926)	-
"Collation"	The Calendar of Modern Letters 3.3 (October 1926)	-
"Summer"	London Calendar 4 (April 1927)	Short Stories
"Theme"	transition 1 (April 1927)	Short Stories
"Portrait"	transition 3 (June 1927)	Short Stories
"Polar Bear and Others"	transition 6 (September 1927)	Wedding Day and Other Stories
"Bitte Nehmen Sie Die Blumen"	transition 9 (December 1927)	Short Stories
"Madame Tout Petit"	The Second American Caravan (September 1928)	Wedding Day and Other Stories
"Vacation Time"	transition 14 (Fall 1928)	Short Stories
"Uncle Anne"	Short Stories (March 1929)	Short Stories
"Spring Morning"	Short Stories (March 1929)	Short Stories
"On the Run"	transition 16/17 (June 1929)	Wedding Day and Other Stories
"Episode in the Life of an Ancestor"	Hound & Horn (Fall 1930)	Wedding Day and Other Stories
"Wedding Day"	Wedding Day and Other Stories (November 1930)	Wedding Day and Other Stories
"Letters of a Lady"	Wedding Day and Other Stories (November 1930)	Wedding Day and Other Stories
"Kroy Wen"	Front 1.1 (December 1930)	The First Lover and Other Stories
"Rest Cure"	Story (April–May 1931)	The First Lover and Other Stories
"The First Lover"	Harper's Magazine (June 1931)	The First Lover and Other Stories
"His Idea of a Mother"	Scribner's Magazine (July 1931)	The First Lover and Other Stories
"One of Ours"	The New Yorker (October 17, 1931)	The First Lover and Other Stories
"Christmas Eve"	The New Yorker (December 26, 1931)	-
"Black Boy"	The New Yorker (May 14, 1932)	The First Lover and Other Stories
"The Man Who Died Young"	The Yale Review (June 1932)	The First Lover and Other Stories
"To the Pure"	Scribner's Magazine (June 1932)	The First Lover and Other Stories
"Friend of the Family"	Harper's Magazine (September 1932)	The First Lover and Other Stories
"Three Little Men"	The Criterion (October 1932)	The First Lover and Other Stories
"Lydia and the Ring Doves"	Vanity Fair (November 1932)	The First Lover and Other Stories
"The Art Colony"	The New Yorker (December 10, 1932)	The First Lover and Other Stories
"I Can't Get Drunk"	Contempo (December 15, 1932)	The First Lover and Other Stories
"The Meeting of the Stones"	The First Lover and Other Stories (March 1933)	The First Lover and Other Stories
"Convalescence"	Story (April 1933)	The White Horses of Vienna
"White as Snow"	The New Yorker (August 5, 1933)	The White Horses of Vienna
"Life Being the Best"	Harper's Magazine (November 1933)	The White Horses of Vienna
"Keep Your Pity"	Brooklyn Eagle (November 26, 1933)	The White Horses of Vienna
"Peter Foxe"	Harper's Bazaar (December 1933)	The White Horses of Vienna
"Natives Don't Cry"	The American Mercury (March 1934)	The White Horses of Vienna
"Career"	Direction 1.1 (Autumn 1934)	The White Horses of Vienna
"Maiden, Maiden"	Harper's Bazaar (December 1934)	The White Horses of Vienna
"First Offense"	The New Yorker (January 5, 1935)	The White Horses of Vienna
"The White Horses of Vienna"	Harper's Magazine (April 1935)	The White Horses of Vienna
"Count Lothar's Heart"	Harper's Bazaar (May 1935)	The White Horses of Vienna
"I'm Ready to Drop Dead"	The New Yorker (July 6, 1935)	-
"Winter in Italy"	The New Yorker (November 23, 1935)	The White Horses of Vienna
"Major Alshuster"	Harper's Magazine (December 1935)	The White Horses of Vienna
"Astronomer's Wife"	The London Mercury (December 1935)	The White Horses of Vienna
"Venezuela"	The Dubuque Dial (December 1935)	365 Days
"Portugal"	The Dubuque Dial (December 1935)	365 Days
"March the Eleventh (Tasmania)"	Caravel 4 (1935)	365 Days
"July the Twenty-Seventh (Austria)"	Caravel 4 (1935)	365 Days
"Security"	The New Yorker (January 25, 1936)	The White Horses of Vienna
"Your Body is a Jewel Box"	New Writers 1.2 (February 1936)	The White Horses of Vienna
"Rondo at Carraroe"	The Spectator (February 28, 1936)	The White Horses of Vienna
"Dear Mr. Walrus"	The White Horses of Vienna (February 1936)	The White Horses of Vienna
"How Bridie's Girl Was Won"	Harper's Magazine (March 1936)	Thirty Stories
"January the Eighth (Derry)"	Caravel 5 (March 1936)	365 Days
"Volunteer"	The New Yorker (May 16, 1936)	-
(remaining pieces)	365 Days (November 1936)	365 Days
"The Herring Piece"	The New Yorker (April 10, 1937)	Thirty Stories
"The Baron and the Chemist"	The New Yorker (February 26, 1938)	-
"The Story I Wanted to Tell You"	transition 27 (April–May 1938)	-
"Life Sentence"	Harper's Bazaar (June 1938)	-
"The Bridegroom's Body"	The Southern Review 4.1 (Summer 1938)	The Crazy Hunter
"The Taxi Ride"	Seven 2 (Autumn 1938)	-
"War in Paris"	The New Yorker (November 26, 1938)	-
"Ben"	The New Yorker (December 24, 1938)	Thirty Stories
"Anschluss"	Harper's Magazine (April 1939)	Nothing Ever Breaks Except the Heart
"Listen Munich"	The New Yorker (August 19, 1939)	-
"Big Fiddle"	The Phoenix (Autumn 1938, Spring 1939 & Autumn 1939)	The Crazy Hunter
"Second Generation"	Seven 6 (Autumn 1939)	-
"Mrs. Carrigan's Daughter"	Kingdom Come 1.1 (November 1939)	-
"The Crows"	Kingdom Come 1.2 (December 1939-January 1940)	-
"Poor Monsieur Panalitus"	The New Yorker (January 20, 1940)	-
"Diplomat's Wife"	Harper's Bazaar (February 1940)	Thirty Stories
"The Crazy Hunter"	The Crazy Hunter (March 1940)	The Crazy Hunter
"Germans"	Kingdom Come 1.3 (Spring 1940)	-
"Effigy of War"	The New Yorker (May 25, 1940)	Thirty Stories
"A Blackout"	Harper's Bazaar (July 1940)	-
"Major Engagement in Paris"	The American Mercury (August 1940)	Thirty Stories
"They Weren't Going to Die"	The New Yorker (October 12, 1940)	Thirty Stories
"T'en Fais Pas"	Harper's Bazaar (December 1940)	-
"Men"	Harper's Bazaar (February 1941)	Thirty Stories
"Defeat"	The New Yorker (May 17, 1941)	Thirty Stories
"Nothing Ever Breaks Except the Heart"	The New Yorker (October 4, 1941)	Nothing Ever Breaks Except the Heart
"Let There Be Honour"	The Saturday Evening Post (November 8, 1941)	Thirty Stories
"Wanderer"	Accent 2.2 (Winter 1942)	-
"Their Name Is Macaroni"	The New Yorker (January 3, 1942)	Thirty Stories
"The Eternal Train"	Harper's Bazaar (June 1942)	-
"Hilaire and the Maréchal Pétard"	Harper's Magazine (August 1942)	Thirty Stories
"This They Took With Them" aka "This They Carried With Them"	Harper's Bazaar (October 1942)	Thirty Stories
"Frenchman's Ship"	The Saturday Evening Post (November 21, 1942)	Nothing Ever Breaks Except the Heart
"Cairo Street"	Accent 3.2 (Winter 1943)	-
"The Canals of Mars"	Harper's Bazaar (February 1943)	Thirty Stories
"The Little Distance"	The Saturday Evening Post (March 6, 1943)	Nothing Ever Breaks Except the Heart
"The Loneliest Man in the U.S. Army"	Woman's Home Companion (July 1943)	Thirty Stories
"Last Aviator Left Flying"	American Magazine (December 1943)	-
"Luck for the Road"	Woman's Home Companion (January 1944)	Nothing Ever Breaks Except the Heart
"The Ships Going to Glory"	The Saturday Evening Post (August 5, 1944)	-
"Hotel Behind the Lines"	The Nation (June 9 & 16, 1945)	Nothing Ever Breaks Except the Heart
"Winter Night"	The New Yorker (January 19, 1946)	Thirty Stories
"The Miracle Goat"	Woman's Home Companion (January 1947)	-
"Army of Occupation"	The New Yorker (June 7, 1947)	Nothing Ever Breaks Except the Heart
"One Small Diamond Please"	Woman's Home Companion (August 1947)	-
"Dream Dance"	The Saturday Evening Post (December 13, 1947)	-
"The Searching Heart"	Woman's Home Companion (January 1948)	-
"French Harvest"	Tomorrow (May 1948)	Nothing Ever Breaks Except the Heart
"Decision" aka "Passport to Doom"	The Saturday Evening Post (May 15, 1948)	Three Short Novels
"Evening at Home"	The New Yorker (October 9, 1948)	Nothing Ever Breaks Except the Heart
"The Criminal"	The New Yorker (March 5, 1949)	The Smoking Mountain: Stories of Postwar Germany
"Begin Again"	The New Yorker (May 7, 1949)	The Smoking Mountain: Stories of Postwar Germany
"Summer Evening"	The New Yorker (June 25, 1949)	The Smoking Mountain: Stories of Postwar Germany
"Adam's Death"	The New Yorker (September 10, 1949)	The Smoking Mountain: Stories of Postwar Germany
"Fife's House"	The New Yorker (October 15, 1949)	The Smoking Mountain: Stories of Postwar Germany
"Frankfurt in Our Blood"	The Nation (October 15, 1949)	The Smoking Mountain: Stories of Postwar Germany
"The Lovers of Gain"	The Nation (June 24, 1950)	The Smoking Mountain: Stories of Postwar Germany
"A Disgrace to the Family"	The Saturday Evening Post (September 23, 1950)	Nothing Ever Breaks Except the Heart
"Home"	Harper's Magazine (January 1951)	The Smoking Mountain: Stories of Postwar Germany
"The Lost"	Tomorrow (March 1951)	The Smoking Mountain: Stories of Postwar Germany
"Cabaret"	Tomorrow (April 1951)	The Smoking Mountain: Stories of Postwar Germany
"Aufwiedersehen Abend"	Harper's Magazine (April 1951)	The Smoking Mountain: Stories of Postwar Germany
"Diagnosis of a Selfish Lady"	The Saturday Evening Post (April 5, 1952)	-
"The Soldier Ran Away"	The Saturday Evening Post (February 28, 1953)	Nothing Ever Breaks Except the Heart
"The Daring Impersonation"	The Saturday Evening Post (August 8–15, 1953)	-
"Fear"	New Statesman and Nation (September 25, 1954)	-
"Carnival of Fear"	The Saturday Evening Post (December 11, 1954)	-
"A Puzzled Race"	The Nation (June 4, 1955)	Nothing Ever Breaks Except the Heart
"The Kill"	Harper's Magazine (August 1955)	Nothing Ever Breaks Except the Heart
"Should Be Considered Extremely Dangerous"	Story (January–February 1963)	Nothing Ever Breaks Except the Heart
"The Ballet of Central Park"	The Saturday Evening Post (November 28, 1964)	Nothing Ever Breaks Except the Heart
"One Sunny Morning"	The Saturday Evening Post (July 3, 1965)	Nothing Ever Breaks Except the Heart
"You Don't Have to Be a Member of the Congregation"	Liberation 11.2 (April 1966)	Nothing Ever Breaks Except the Heart
"The Wild Horses"	The Saturday Evening Post (April 9, 1966)	-
"Fire in the Vineyards"	Nothing Ever Breaks Except the Heart (June 1966)	Nothing Ever Breaks Except the Heart
"Seven Say You Can Hear Corn Grow"	Nothing Ever Breaks Except the Heart (June 1966)	Nothing Ever Breaks Except the Heart
"A Christmas Carol for Harold Ross"	Nothing Ever Breaks Except the Heart (June 1966)	Nothing Ever Breaks Except the Heart
"Nolo Contendere"	Antaeus 13/14 (Spring/Summer 1974)	-
"St. Stephen's Green"	The Atlantic (June 1980)	-
