= Contact (literary magazine) =

American literary magazine

Contact was an American literary "little magazine" published during the early 1920s and again in 1932. Following their introduction in 1920 by Marsden Hartley at a party hosted by Lola Ridge, William Carlos Williams and Robert McAlmon endeavored to create an outlet for works showcasing Williams' theory of "contact", a theory centered on the belief that art should derive from an artist's direct experience and sense of place and should reject traditional notions of value. Williams desired to create a distinctly American form of art free of the literary tradition running throughout the work of T. S. Eliot.

Under the co-editorship of Williams and McAlmon, four issues of Contact appeared between December 1920 and summer 1921, with a fifth issue appearing in June 1923. These issues were cheaply made, contained no advertisements or tables of contents, and suffered from multiple typographical errors. The first two issues were printed using a mimeograph machine upon paper donated by Williams' father-in-law. Williams and McAlmon were able raise enough money to send the third issue, containing the only artwork to appear during the first run of Contact, to a professional printer, creating a noticeably superior production quality over the other issues in the first run. The fourth and fifth issues were printed on standard white paper.

Although it published early work from writers, including H.D., Marianne Moore, Wallace Stevens, Williams, McAlmon, and Mina Loy, the magazine was never financially successful, and its circulation is estimated to have been around two hundred subscribers during the first run. Williams ended the first run in 1923 with a very brief fifth issue that contained a mere five poems.

Williams revived Contact in 1932 under the name Contact: An American Quarterly Review. Although McAlmon was active in publishing works of Williams' circle through his own publishing company, Contact Publishing Company (a/k/a Contact Editions), he contributed some literary works to the revived magazine, and although he is listed as an associate editor on the masthead, McAlmon was no longer involved in the production of Contact during its second run. Instead, Williams chose Nathanael West to be his partner in running the magazine. Each of the three issues of Contact's second run is approximately 130 pages in length. Advertising, mostly for books by Contact's contributors or otherwise published by Contact Editions, appear at the beginning of the magazine, and notably the magazine contains one of the first large bibliographies of contemporary little magazines. This bibliography, compiled by David Moss, was too large to publish in a single edition of Contact and therefore ran over the course of all three of the 1932 issues. In addition, the second run of Contact contained chapters from West's novel Miss Lonelyhearts and four poems by E. E. Cummings.
