= Gertrude Beasley =

American memoirist

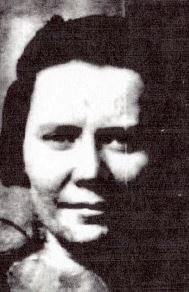
- Born: Edna Gertrude Beasley; June 20, 1892 near Cross Plains, Texas, U.S.
- Died: July 25, 1955 (aged 63); Islip, New York, U.S.
- Education: Simmons College; University of Chicago
- Occupations: Writer, teacher
- Writing career
- Notable work: My First Thirty Years

Edna Gertrude Beasley (June 20, 1892 – July 25, 1955) was an American writer and memoirist. A feminist, her controversial 1925 autobiography, My First Thirty Years (published in Paris, France) received some favorable reviews but was also suppressed, and she soon after disappeared.

Decades after her death, researchers found that when she returned to the United States in the late 1920s, she was committed to a state mental asylum in New York for the rest of her life.

== Life and career ==
Edna Gertrude Beasley was born on June 20, 1892, near Cross Plains, Texas. Her father was an itinerant subsistence farmer. She was the ninth of 13 children in a poor family, and according to Beasley, the product of marital rape. After her last sibling was born, her mother left the marriage, with the children, and moved to Abilene.

Unlike the rest of her family, Beasley was interested in school and education. She became a teacher and obtained a teaching degree. She left Texas to pursue a master's in education at the University of Chicago, which was awarded to her in 1918. According to a later newspaper article, she also worked as a journalist in Chicago. While there, she became involved in organizing for the National Woman's Party.

By 1920, Beasley was in Tokyo, where she wrote for The Far East and also for National Geographic. She later worked as a writer in China and in Moscow.

Contact Editions published Beasley's autobiography, My First Thirty Years, in Paris in 1925. The book included frank coverage of incest and bestiality in addition to rape, advocated for birth control, and praised socialism and the Soviet Union. It received some favorable notices; literary reviewer H. L. Mencken called it "the first genuinely realistic picture of the Southern poor white trash" but speculated that "This book, I suspect, comes out with a Paris imprint because no American publisher would risk printing it" for its frank descriptions. Philosopher Bertrand Russell said it was "truthful, which is illegal". A large number of copies were destroyed by US Customs, and the Texas legislature later investigated the acquisition of a copy by the University of Texas.

Beasley was living in London, where the authorities regarded her book as obscene, accused her of "sending improper matter through the mails" and attempted to deport her to the United States. In 1927 she did sail for America, and en route wrote a letter to the U.S. State Department in which she claimed the British authorities and "certain people in Texas" had threatened her life. A few days after her arrival in New York, she was committed to the state asylum, later known as, Central Islip Psychiatric Center, where she died decades later in 1955.

== Rediscovery ==
In 1989, Texas author Larry McMurtry praised My First Thirty Years and at his urging, the Book Club of Texas reissued it in a costly limited edition. McMurtry also ignited interest in what seemed like a mystery regarding what came of Beasley. Researchers, particularly Alice W. Specht, were eventually able to put together what happened regarding her seeming disappearance and the abrupt end to her writing career. Texas literary critic Don Graham anthologized an excerpt from My First Thirty Years in Lone Star Literature in 2003. The full autobiography was republished in 2021.

According to Texas Monthly's Michael Agresta, "From the very first paragraph [of Beasley's book], readers can be sure that no punches will be pulled". The review concludes, "it’s sometimes a queasy read, but also often a funny one, buoyed by Beasley’s self-searching voice and her acidic assessments".

== Work ==
- Beasley, Gertrude (1925). My First Thirty Years. Paris: Contact Editions. OCLC 762568276.
