= The Escaped Cock =

1929 novel by D.H. Lawrence

- Cover of the first edition
- Author: D. H. Lawrence
- Language: English
- Genre: Historical fiction
- Published: 1929
- Media type: Print

Wood-engraving by John Farleigh from The Escaped Cock

The Escaped Cock is a short novel by D. H. Lawrence that he originally wrote in two parts and published in 1929. Lawrence wrote the first part in 1927 after visiting some Etruscan tombs with his friend Earl Brewster, a trip that encouraged the author to reflect upon death and myths of resurrection. "The original short story version of Part I of the novel appeared in The Forum magazine, February 1928." Lawrence added the second part in 1928 during a stay in Gstaad, Switzerland.

== Publication ==
The Black Sun Press first published The Escaped Cock as a limited edition in September 1929. Fifty copies were printed on Japanese vellum, signed by Lawrence and the copy number written in longhand by him, with decorations in color by the author. Critic Harry Moore considered the work to be the last of Lawrence's important prose fiction.

== Origins ==
The Escaped Cock was always Lawrence's preferred title, but the tale has been printed under the title The Man Who Died by some later publishers. In February 1930, the dying Lawrence was negotiating about an unlimited edition with the London publisher, Charles Lahr. Lahr asked for the title to be changed to The Man Who Died and Lawrence eventually agreed, insisting that the original title should be retained as a subtitle. This projected Lahr edition failed to appear and the first English edition was eventually published by Martin Secker in September 1931 as The Man Who Died, a title never approved by the author. The work was illustrated with wood-engravings by John Farleigh.

Brenda Maddox suggests that Martin Secker rejected the original title because of the double entendre. However, she writes, "Lawrence emphatically denied the vernacular meaning of a plain English word. He refused to acknowledge that 'cock' connoted anything but a rooster, just as he denied the blasphemous pun contained in the story's climactic line, uttered as the man observes the miracle between his legs: 'I am risen!'"

== Plot summary ==
The story is a recasting of the resurrection of Christ narrated in the New Testament. The man who survives his crucifixion comes to celebrate his bodily existence and sensuality. Lawrence himself summarized The Escaped Cock in a letter to Brewster (May 3, 1927):

I wrote a story of the Resurrection, where Jesus gets up and feels very sick about everything, and can't stand the old crowd any more — so cuts out — and as he heals up, he begins to find what an astonishing place the phenomenal world is, far more marvellous than any salvation or heaven — and thanks his stars he needn't have a 'mission' any more.

== Manuscript ==
Lawrence's handwritten manuscript for The Escaped Cock is part of the rare book collection at the Grinnell College Libraries Special Collections and Archives. The book was formerly part of the Salisbury House until the Salisbury House collection of rare books and manuscripts was sold to Grinnell College in August 2019. Cosmetics magnate Carl Weeks, who built Salisbury House, acquired the manuscript from rare book dealer Harry F. Marks of New York. In correspondence between Weeks and Lawrence's widow, Frieda (also located in the Grinnell College Special Collections and Archives), Mrs Lawrence noted that the manuscript had been given by Lawrence to Black Sun Press owner/publisher Harry Crosby, "NOT as a gift" (Mrs Lawrence's words), but that after Crosby's death, the manuscript did not "come home." Frieda concluded her note to Weeks by saying she was satisfied by his stewardship of the document, so long as he left it for the public good, because "such is the nature of genius."
