= The Bridge (poem) =

Long poem by Hart Crane

First edition (publ. Black Sun Press)

The Bridge, first published in 1930 by the Black Sun Press, is Hart Crane's first, and only, attempt at a long poem. (Its primary status as either an epic or a series of lyrical poems remains contested; recent criticism tends to read it as a hybrid, perhaps indicative of a new genre, the "modernist epic.")

The Bridge was inspired by New York City's "poetry landmark", the Brooklyn Bridge. Crane lived for some time at 110 Columbia Heights in Brooklyn, where he had an excellent view of the bridge; only after The Bridge was finished did Crane learn that one of its key builders, Washington Roebling, had once lived at the same address.

The first edition of the book features photographs by Crane's friend the photographer Walker Evans.

== Contents ==
The Bridge comprises 15 lyric poems of varying length and scope. In style, it mixes near-Pindaric declamatory metre, free verse, sprung metre, Elizabethan diction and demotic language at various points between alternating stanzas and often in the same stanzas. In terms of its acoustical coherence, it requires its reader, novelly, to follow both end-paused and non end-paused enjambments in a style Crane intended to be redolent of the flow of the jazz or classical music he tended to listen to when he wrote. Though the poem follows a thematic progress, it freely juggles various points in time. The University of Illinois' Modern American Poetry website analyzes the symbolic meaning of "the bridge" as central image throughout the book:

When Crane positions himself under the shadows of the bridge, he is, in one sense, simply the poet of the romantic tradition, the observer who stands aside the better to see; but he is, in another sense, the gay male cruising in an area notorious for its casual sex. Even the bridge itself, the Brooklyn Bridge that is the central object of the poem, was strongly identified in Crane's own mind with [Crane's lover] Emil Opffer, to whom "Voyages" was dedicated. The appearance of the bridge secretly encrypts a highly personal memory and a specific presence in the text. Crane's "epic of America" gets underway as a personal quest, as a poem divided against itself, in devotion to an urban setting that encourages social diversity, with secret inscriptions that retain their meanings to which only a privileged few are accessible.

"Proem: To Brooklyn Bridge" is the short lyrical ode to the Brooklyn Bridge and New York City which opens the sequence and serves as an introduction (and New York City's urban landscape remains a dominant presence throughout the book). After beginning with this ode, "Ave Maria" begins the first longer sequence labeled Roman numeral I which describes Columbus' eastward return from his accidental voyage to the Americas. The title of the piece is based upon the fact that Columbus attributed his crew's survival across the Atlantic Ocean to "the intercession of the Virgin Mary." The second major section of the poem, "Powhatan's Daughter", is divided into five parts, and one well-known part, "The River", follows a group of vagabonds, in the 20th century, who are traveling west through America via train. In "The River", Crane incorporates advertisements and references minstrel shows. He said in a letter that "the rhythm [in this section] is jazz." The section also includes the story of Pocahontas (who was "Powhatan's Daughter") and a section on the fictional character Rip Van Winkle. The fourth section of "Powhatan's Daughter", entitled "The Dance", contains the line "O Appalachian Spring!" from which dancer and choreographer Martha Graham took the title of her ballet Appalachian Spring, scored by composer Aaron Copland.

Other major sections of the poem include "Cape Hatteras" (the longest individual section of the poem), "Quaker Hill", "The Tunnel", and "Atlantis", the rapturous final section that returns the poem's focus back to the Brooklyn Bridge, and which was actually the first part of the overall poem finished despite its reservation for the end.

== Critical reception ==
Upon its publication, The Bridge received mostly negative reviews. Yvor Winters, a contemporary and friend of Crane's who had praised Crane's previous book, White Buildings, wrote one such review, in which he associated Crane's book with Modernist works by James Joyce and William Carlos Williams. Due to his disparaging views toward modernism as a whole, Winters viewed such an association negatively. In Winters's own words, The Bridge "has no narrative framework and so lacks the formal unity of an epic."

In a slightly more mixed review, "Metaphor in Contemporary Poetry", Cudworth Flint wrote, "This poem seems to me indubitably the work of a man of genius, and it contains passages of compact imagination and compelling rhythms. But its central intention, to give to America a myth embodying a creed which may sustain us somewhat as Christianity has done in the past, the poem fails."

Critical consensus on The Bridge (and on Crane's status in the modernist canon more broadly) still remains deeply divided. Some critics believe that The Bridge was Crane's crowning achievement, and that it is a masterpiece of American modernism. For instance, Gregory Woods writes that "Hart Crane’s place in the modernist pantheon is established by The Bridge", and when the literary critic Harold Bloom placed Crane in his pantheon of the best modernist American poets of the 20th century, he focused on The Bridge as Crane's most significant achievement, putting it on the same level as T. S. Eliot's The Waste Land, though Bloom regarded Crane as the superior poet, as evidenced in this section from his introduction to Crane's complete poems: "But after a lifetime of disliking Eliot's literary and "cultural" criticism, I have to yield to The Waste Land, because Hart Crane did, though he went down fighting the poem. The glory of The Bridge (1930) is its ambivalent warfare with The Waste Land, without which Crane would not have been the miracle he was". The poet and critic Randall Jarrell had more mixed feelings about the lack of overall consistency in the epic, writing, "Hart Crane's The Bridge does not succeed as a unified work of art, partly because some of its poems are bad or mediocre"; nevertheless, Jarrell goes on to write, "how wonderful parts of The Bridge are! 'Van Winkle' is one of the clearest and freshest and most truly American poems ever written." Allen Ginsberg called "Atlantis" the greatest work in Western metrical rhetoric since Shelley's "Adonais".

More recently, Jarrell and Flint's criticisms of the poem have been echoed, and even been amplified, by more conservative contemporary poetry critics Adam Kirsch and William Logan who both wrote highly critical reviews of Crane's work following the publication of Hart Crane: Complete Poems and Selected Letters by the Library of America in 2006. In an article for The New Yorker, Kirsch called The Bridge "an impressive failure ... [that] varies wildly in quality, containing some of Crane’s best writing and some of his worst." Kirsch goes on to call parts of the "Atlantis" section of the poem "exhilarating" while he criticizes the "Indiana" section for being "rankly sentimental".

From a more positive critical perspective, The Bridge was recently singled out by the Academy of American Poets as one of the 20th century's "Groundbreaking Books". The organization writes, "Physically removed from the city [since he began the piece while living in the Caribbean], Crane relied on his memory and imagination to render the numerous awesome and grotesque nuances of New York, evident in poems such as 'The Tunnel' and 'Cutty Sark'. The book's opening, 'Proem: To Brooklyn Bridge', is indicative of Crane's ecstatic, symbolic vision of the modern city ... However, [because of his suicide in April 1932,] Crane would never again complete anything as complex or compelling as The Bridge."

== Composition ==
According to the 1988 Voices and Visions PBS documentary on Crane, when Crane first began to write The Bridge, he "felt ... stuck and was incapable of writing more than a few lines." Around this time Crane wrote, "Emotionally I should like to write The Bridge. Intellectually the whole theme seems more and more absurd. The very idea of a bridge is an act of faith. The form of my poem rises out of a past that so overwhelms the present with its worth and vision that I'm at a loss to explain my delusion that there exists any real links between that past and a future destiny worthy of it. If only America were half as worthy today to be spoken of as Whitman spoke of it fifty years ago, there might be something for me to say." As the poem began to take shape and showed promise, Crane wrote, "The Bridge is symphonic in including all the strands: Columbus, conquest of water, land, Pocahontas, subways, offices. The Bridge, in becoming a ship, a world, a woman, a tremendous harp as it does finally, seems to really have a career."
