= Stratford-on-Odéon =

Literary circle

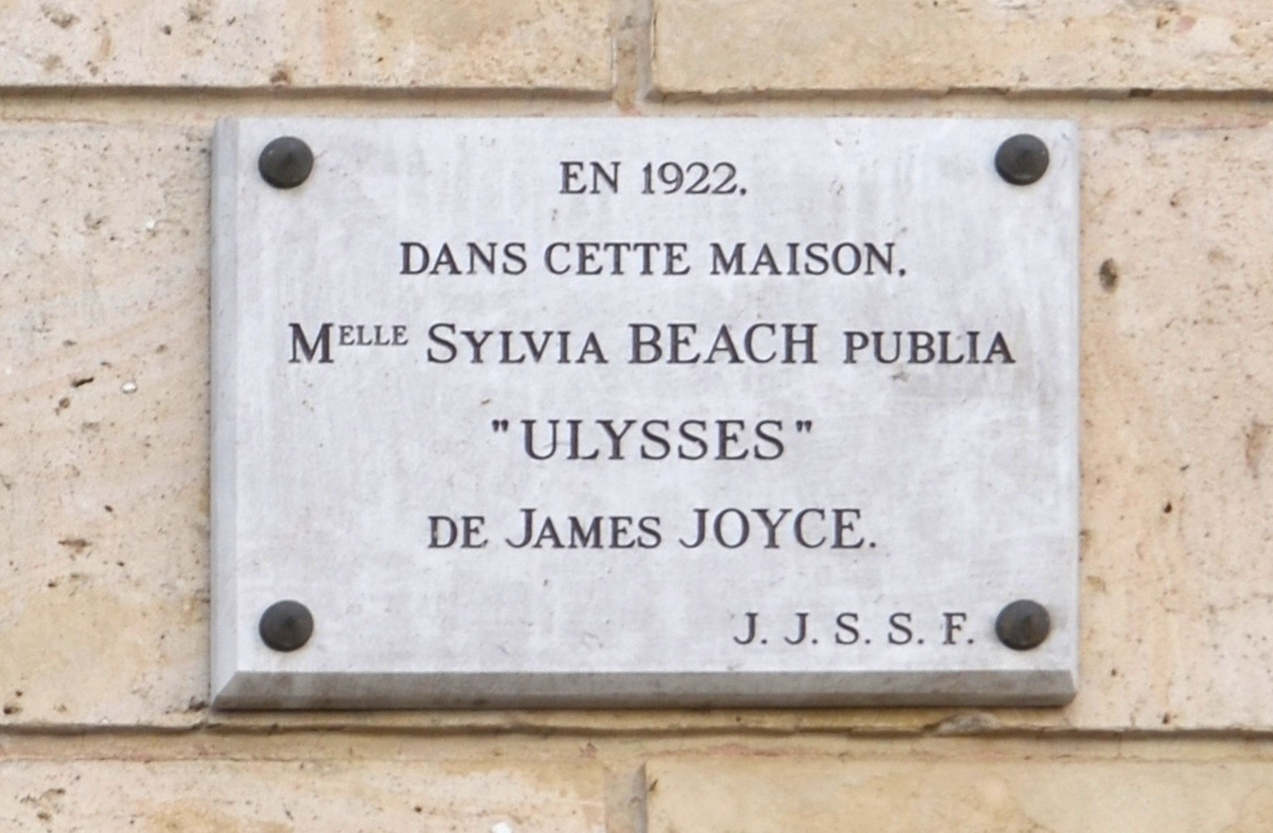
Paris Rue de l Odeon 12 plaque

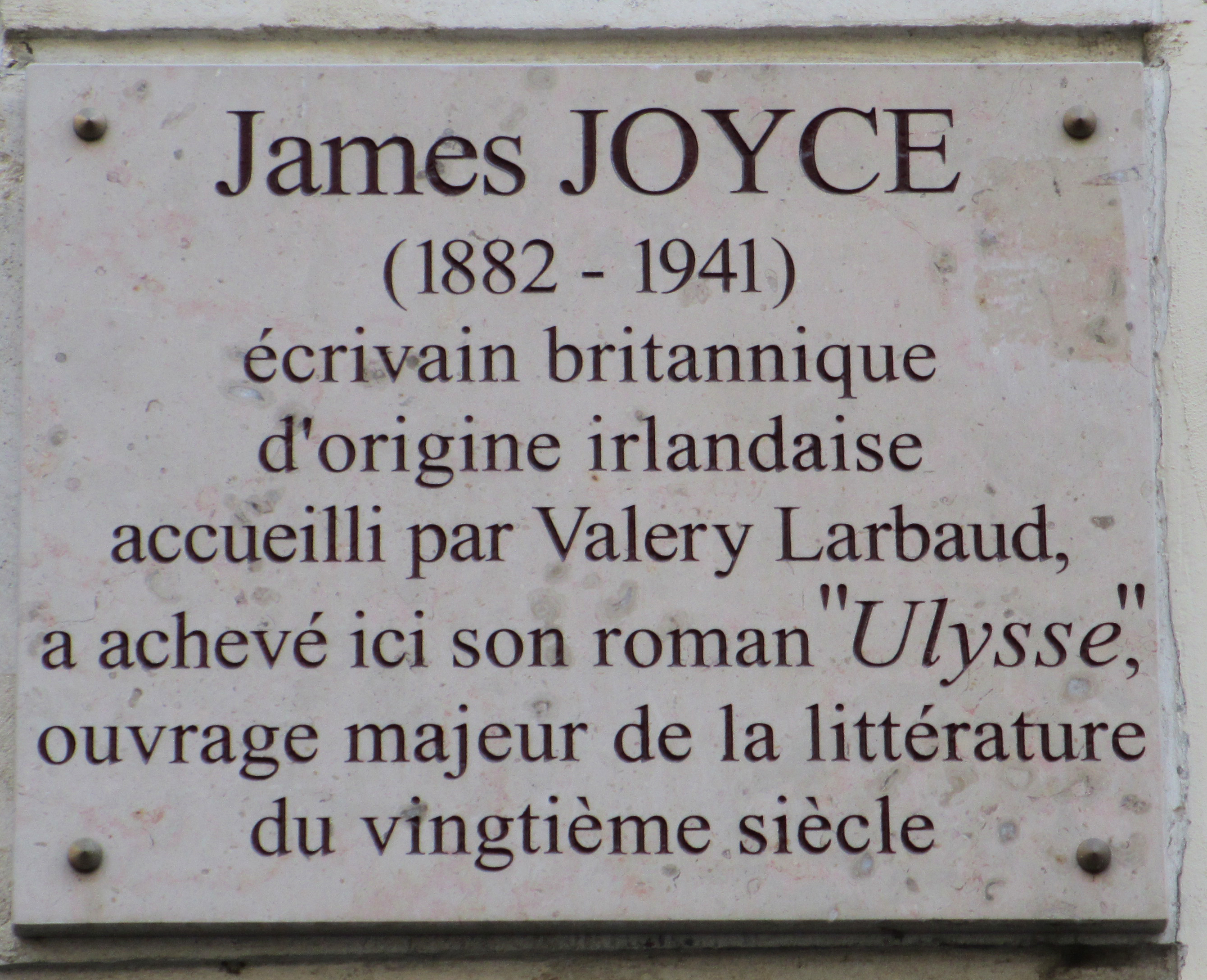
James Joyce plaque - 71 rue de Cardinal Lemoine, Paris 5

Stratford-on-Odéon was both a literary circle and James Joyce's affectionate nickname for the Rue de l'Odéon in Paris's Left Bank, its two bookstores (Adrienne Monnier's La Maison des Amis des Livres and Sylvia Beach's Shakespeare and Company; Monnier and Beach thought of it as Odéonia) and the "coterie of emergent Anglophone writers surrounding them".

Ernest Hemingway, James Joyce, Ezra Pound, Gertrude Stein and F. Scott Fitzgerald were among the famous writers who comprised "Stratford-on-Odéon".

Monnier offered advice and encouragement when Beach founded her bookstore in 1919 at 8 rue Dupuytren within close propinquous distance in the arrondissemont to Monnier's own. In 1921 Shakespeare and Company was relocated in rue de l'Odéon and Joyce pounced with his sobriquet. During the 1920s, the shops owned by Beach and Monnier were located across from each other. Both bookstores became gathering places for French, British, and American writers. By sponsoring readings and encouraging informal conversations among authors and readers, the two women brought to bookselling a domesticity and hospitality that encouraged friendship as well as cultural exchange. Joyce used Shakespeare and Company as his office.

Beach published James Joyce's Ulysses in 1922. The store and its literary inhabitants are mentioned in Hemingway's 1964 posthumously published memoir A Moveable Feast. It became a hub for British and American modernists. Their meeting place could not effectively continue during the German occupation of Paris, World War II.

== See also ==
- Adrienne Monnier and La Maison des Amis des Livres

== Sources ==
- Benstock, Shari (1986). "Sylvia Beach and Adrienne Monnier: Rue de l'Odéon". Women of the Left Bank, Paris, 1900–1940. Austin: University of Texas Press. pp. 194–229. ISBN 978-0292790407.
- Glass, Charles (2009). Americans in Paris: Life and Death Under Nazi Occupation. London: Harper Collins. ISBN 978-0-00-722853-9.
- Monnier, Adrienne; McDougall, Richard (1996) [1976]. The Very Rich Hours of Adrienne Monnier. Lincoln, NE: University of Nebraska Press. ISBN 978-0-8032-8227-8.
