= Adrienne Monnier =

French bookseller, writer and publisher

- Born: 26 April 1892; Paris, France
- Died: 19 June 1955 (aged 63); Paris, France
- Occupations: Bookseller, publisher, writer

Adrienne Monnier (26 April 1892 – 19 June 1955) was a French bookseller, writer, and publisher, and an influential figure in the modernist writing scene in Paris, in the 1920s and 1930s.

== Formative years ==
Monnier was born in Paris on 26 April 1892. Her father, Clovis Monnier (1859–1944), was a postal worker, sorting mail in transit on night trains. Her mother, Philiberte (née Sollier, 1873–1944), had an interest in literature and the arts. Adrienne's younger sister, Marie (1894–1976), became known as an embroiderer and illustrator. Their mother encouraged the sisters to read widely from an early age and frequently took them to the theatre, opera, and ballet.

In 1909, aged 17, Monnier graduated from high school, with a teaching qualification (brevet supérieur). In September of the same year, she moved to London, officially to improve her English but in reality to be close to her classmate, Suzanne Bonnierre, with whom she was "very much in love". Monnier spent three months working as an au pair, before finding a job for six months teaching French in Eastbourne. She later wrote about her English experiences in Souvenirs de Londres ("Memories of London").

Back in France, Monnier taught briefly at a private school, before enrolling on a shorthand and typing course. In 1912, she found work as a secretary at the Université des Annales, a Right Bank publishing house specialising in mainstream literary and cultural works. Although Monnier enjoyed the work, she had little in common with the writers and journalists with whom she came into contact, preferring the bohemian Left Bank and the avant-garde literary world that it represented.

In November 1913, Monnier's father, Clovis, was seriously injured in a train crash while at work; he was left with a lifelong limp. When the compensation came through, he gave all of it – 10,000 francs – to Monnier, to help her set up in bookselling.

== La Maison des Amis des Livres ==
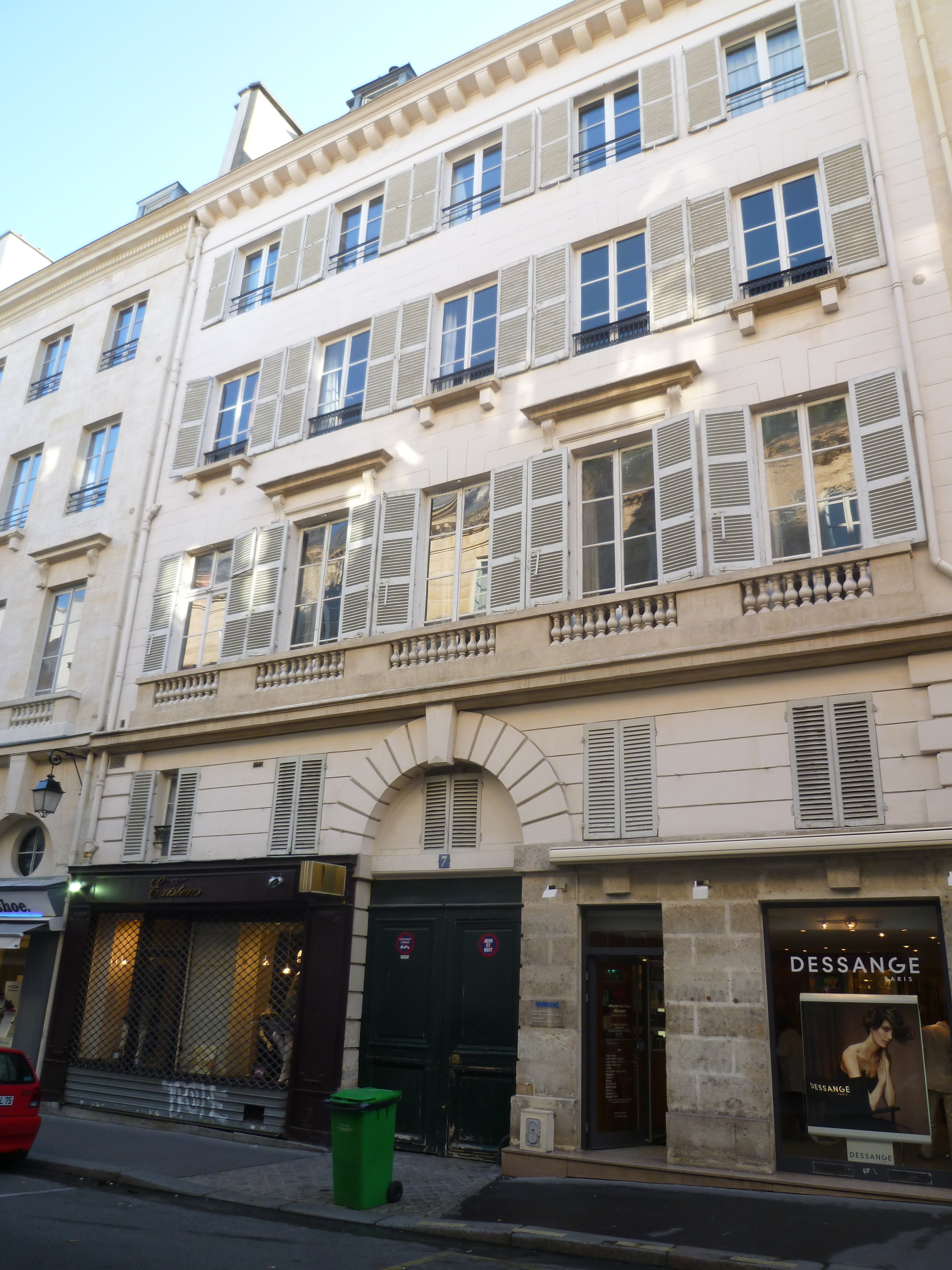
The building at 7 rue de l'Odéon in which Monnier opened her bookshop in 1915

On 15 November 1915, Monnier opened her bookshop and lending library, La Maison des Amis des Livres, at 7 rue de l'Odéon, Paris VI. She was among the first women in France to found her own bookstore. Monnier had worked as a teacher and as a literary secretary, and with limited capital she opened her shop at a time when there was a genuine need for a new bookstore, since many booksellers had left their work to join the armed forces. As her reputation spread, Monnier's advice was sought out by other women who hoped to follow her example and become booksellers.

Monnier offered advice and encouragement to Sylvia Beach when Beach founded an English language bookstore called Shakespeare and Company in 1919. During the 1920s, the shops owned by Beach and Monnier were located across from each other on the rue de l'Odéon in the heart of the Latin Quarter. Both bookstores became gathering places for French, British, and American writers, sponsoring readings and encouraging informal conversations among authors and readers.

== Le Navire d'Argent ==
In June 1925, Monnier, with Beach's support, launched a French language review, Le Navire d'Argent (The Silver Ship), with Jean Prévost as literary editor. Taking its name from the silver sailing ship which appears in Paris's coat of arms, it cost 5 francs per issue, or 50 francs for a twelve-month subscription. Although financially unsuccessful, it was an important part of the literary scene of the 1920s and was "a great European light", helping launch several writers' careers. Typically about a hundred pages per issue, it was "French in language, but international in spirit" and drew heavily on the circle of writers frequenting her shop. The first edition contained a French-language translation (prepared jointly by Monnier and Beach) of T. S. Eliot's poem "The Love Song of J. Alfred Prufrock" (May 1925). Other issues included an early draft of part of James Joyce's Finnegans Wake (October 1925) and an abridged version of Antoine de Saint-Exupéry's novella The Aviator (April 1926). One edition (March 1926) was devoted to American writers (including Walt Whitman, William Carlos Williams, and E. E. Cummings). It also first introduced Ernest Hemingway in translation to French audiences. Monnier herself contributed under the pseudonym J-M Sollier, based on her mother's maiden name. After twelve issues, Monnier abandoned Le Navire d’Argent, as the effort and the cost was more than she could manage. To cover her losses, Monnier auctioned her personal collection of 400 books, many inscribed to her by their authors. A decade later, Monnier launched a successor periodical, the Gazette des Amis des Livres, which ran from January 1938 until May 1940.

== Later years ==
Although Beach closed her store during the German Occupation, Monnier's remained open. For ten years after the war Monnier continued her work as an essayist, translator, and bookseller. Plagued by ill health, Monnier was diagnosed in September 1954 with Ménière's disease, a disorder of the inner ear which affects balance and hearing. She also suffered from delusions. On 19 June 1955, she died by suicide by taking an overdose of sleeping pills.

== Works ==
- La Figure, Éditions Julliard, 1923.
- Les Vertus, Éditions Julliard, 1926.
- Fableaux, Éditions Julliard, 1932.
- Souvenirs de Londres, Mercure de France, 1957.
- Rue de l'Odéon, Éditions Albin Michel, Paris, 1960.
- Les Gazettes, Éditions Gallimard, 1960.

== Sources ==
- Benstock, Shari (1986). "Sylvia Beach and Adrienne Monnier: Rue de l'Odéon". Women of the Left Bank, Paris, 1900–1940. Austin: University of Texas Press. pp. 194–229. ISBN 978-0292790407.
- Beach, Sylvia (1991) [1959]. Shakespeare & Company (First Bison Books ed.). Lincoln NE: University of Nebraska Press. ISBN 978-0-8032-6097-9.
- Fitch, Noël Riley (1985) [1983]. Sylvia Beach and the Lost Generation (Paperback ed.). New York: WW Norton. ISBN 9-780393-302318.
- Glass, Charles (2009). Americans in Paris: Life and Death Under Nazi Occupation. London: Harper Collins. ISBN 978-0-00-722853-9.
- Monnier, Adrienne; McDougall, Richard (1996) [1976]. The Very Rich Hours of Adrienne Monnier. Lincoln, NE: University of Nebraska Press. ISBN 978-0-8032-8227-8.; UK edition: The Very Rich Hours of Adrienne Monnier: An Intimate Portrait of the Literary and Artistic Life in Paris Between the Wars (Millington Books, 1976) ISBN 0-86000-067-2
- Monnier, Adrienne (2009). Rue de l'Odéon (in French). Paris: Editions Albin Michel. ISBN 978-2-226192271.
- Murat, Laure (2003). Passage de l'Odéon: Sylvia Beach, Adrienne Monnier et la vie littéraire à Paris dans l'entre-deux-guerres (in French). Paris: Fayard. ISBN 978-2-213616629.
- Schiff, Stacy (2006) [1994]. Saint-Exupéry: A biography. New York: Henry Holt. ISBN 978-0-8050-7913-5.
