= Ernest Flammarion =

French publisher

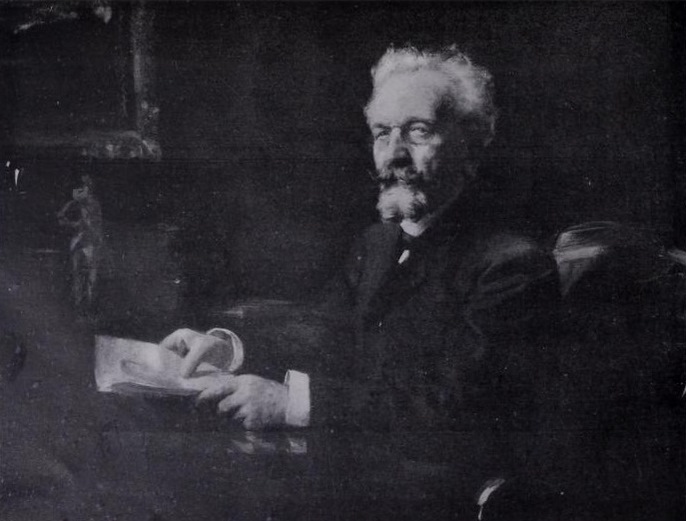
Ernest Flammarion (Styka)

Ernest Flammarion (French pronunciation: [ɛʁnɛst flamaʁjɔ̃]; May 30, 1846, Montigny-le-Roi - January 21, 1936, Paris) was a French publisher, founder of Groupe Flammarion (Flammarion-Marpon Editions).

== Biography ==
Ernest Flammarion is the fourth in a family of six children whose eldest brother, Camille, was a famous astronomer. His parents Jules and Françoise Flammarion ran a haberdashery business.

In 1867, he began working in the bookstore business of Mr. Didier in Paris thanks to the recommendation of his brother Camille.

=== Flammarion Foundation ===
He owes his fame to the publishing house that he founded in association with the Charles Marpon bookstore in 1876, the Flammarion-Marpon editions (now Groupe Flammarion), located in the former Café Voltaire on the Place de l'Odeon in the current 6th arrondissement of Paris. The success of this business is due to the commercial success of Popular Astronomy, his brother's book that he published in 1878. It was a huge bestseller in the late 19th century.

Subsequently, Flammarion Editions turned towards literature by publishing a wide variety of classical, modern authors (Stendhal, Balzac, Gustave Flaubert, Zola, Maupassant, Jules Renard) or more popular authors like Hector Malot, then the catalog was diversified and now covers virtually all publishing sectors with a predilection for popular science and humanities publications.

=== Posterity of editions ===
The house remained family-run, run by Ernest's son, Charles, then his grandson, Henri Flammarion, who took over in 1967. The last of the family's descendants, Charles-Henri Flammarion ran the company from 1985 to 2000, when it came under the control of the Italian group RCS. The latter then went through a period when he encountered financial difficulties. To bail out, in June 2016, he sold the Flammarion editions to the Gallimard group.

== Works ==
- Les Hommes De Bonne Volonté (1938) (Later Prélude á Verdun) (Later Verdun)

== See also ==
Groupe Flammarion

Café Voltaire
