= Rue de l'Odéon =

Street in Paris, France

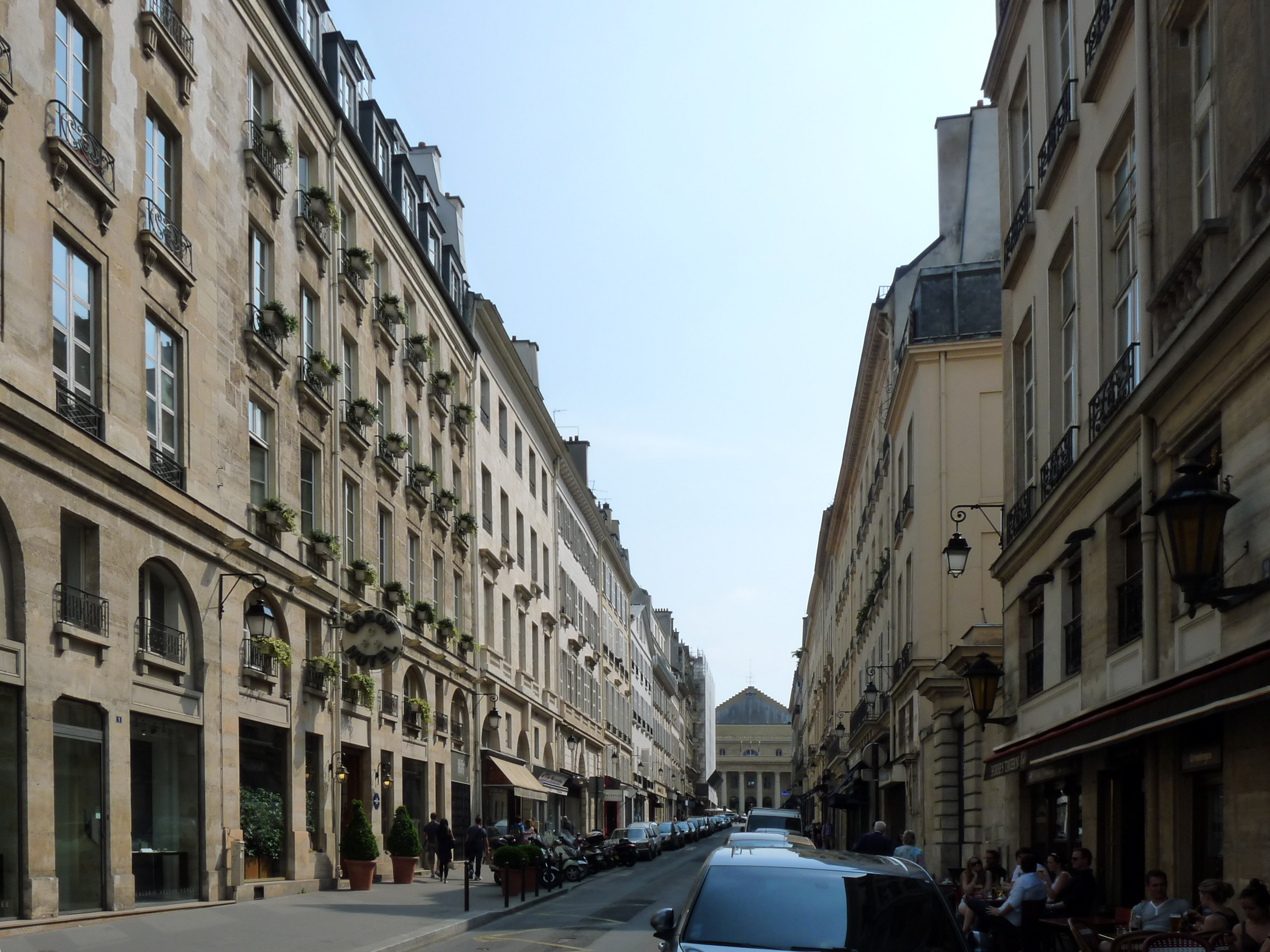
- Rue de l'Odéon, looking towards the Place de l'Odéon

- Location within Paris
- Length: 176 m (577 ft)
- Width: 13 m (43 ft)
- Arrondissement: 6th
- Quarter: Odéon
- Coordinates: 48°51′3.1″N 2°20′19.3″E
- From: 16, carrefour de l'Odéon
- To: 12, place de l'Odéon

Construction
- Completed: 1780
- Denomination: Rue du Théâtre-Français

The Rue de l'Odéon is a street in the Odéon quarter of the 6th arrondissement of Paris on the Left Bank.

Because of the presence of two bohemian bookstores, run respectively by Adrienne Monnier and Sylvia Beach, and the coterie of emergent Anglophone writers surrounding them, James Joyce nicknamed it "Stratford-on-Odéon". Monnier and Beach thought of it as Odéonia.

== History ==
This street was constructed from 1780 onwards following letters patent of 10 August 1779 to establish the Théâtre-Français du faubourg Saint-Germain (now the Odéon-Théâtre de l'Europe).

== Notable residents ==
- No. 7: Adrienne Monnier opened her bookshop, La Maison des amis des livres, there in 1915.
- No. 10: Thomas Paine, the Anglo-French-American intellectual lived there from 1797 to 1802.
- No. 12: Sylvia Beach moved her bookshop Shakespeare and Company there from 8 rue Dupuytrens in 1922 and published Ulysses by James Joyce from this address in 1922. It was closed during World War II in 1941 and never re-opened, despite being personally liberated by Ernest Hemingway.
- No. 12: George Antheil lived above Shakespeare and Company.
- No. 18: Agnes Goodsir, the Australian artist, lived there in the 1920s and 30s with her companion, Rachel Dunn.
- No. 21: Romanian philosopher Emil Cioran lived at this address for most of his life.
- No. 22: Camille Desmoulins with his wife Lucile Desmoulins and Fabre d'Églantine lived in the house at this number, at the junction with the Place de l'Odéon, until they were arrested and subsequently executed on 5 April 1794.
- No. 22: Joachim Barrande, the French palaeontologist living in Prague used to rent a flat in this house.

== Transport ==
The nearest metro station is Odéon on Lines 4 and 10. It is served by RATP buses, numbers 84, 87 and 89.

== Notes and sources ==
=== Sources ===
- This article began as a translation of its French equivalent.
- Garner, Dwight (18 April 2010). "Ex-Pat Paris as It Sizzled for One Literary Lioness". The New York Times. New York.
- Glass, Charles (2009). Americans in Paris: Life and Death Under Nazi Occupation. London: Harper Collins. ISBN 978-0-00-722853-9.
- Monnier, Adrienne; McDougall, Richard (1996) [1976]. The Very Rich Hours of Adrienne Monnier. Lincoln, NE: University of Nebraska Press. ISBN 978-0-8032-8227-8.
- Watson, Bronwyn (8 October 2011). "Public Works: Agnes Goodsir". The Australian. Surry Hills, New South Wales. Archived from the original on 3 May 2015.
