= Laure Murat =

French historian and writer (born 1967)

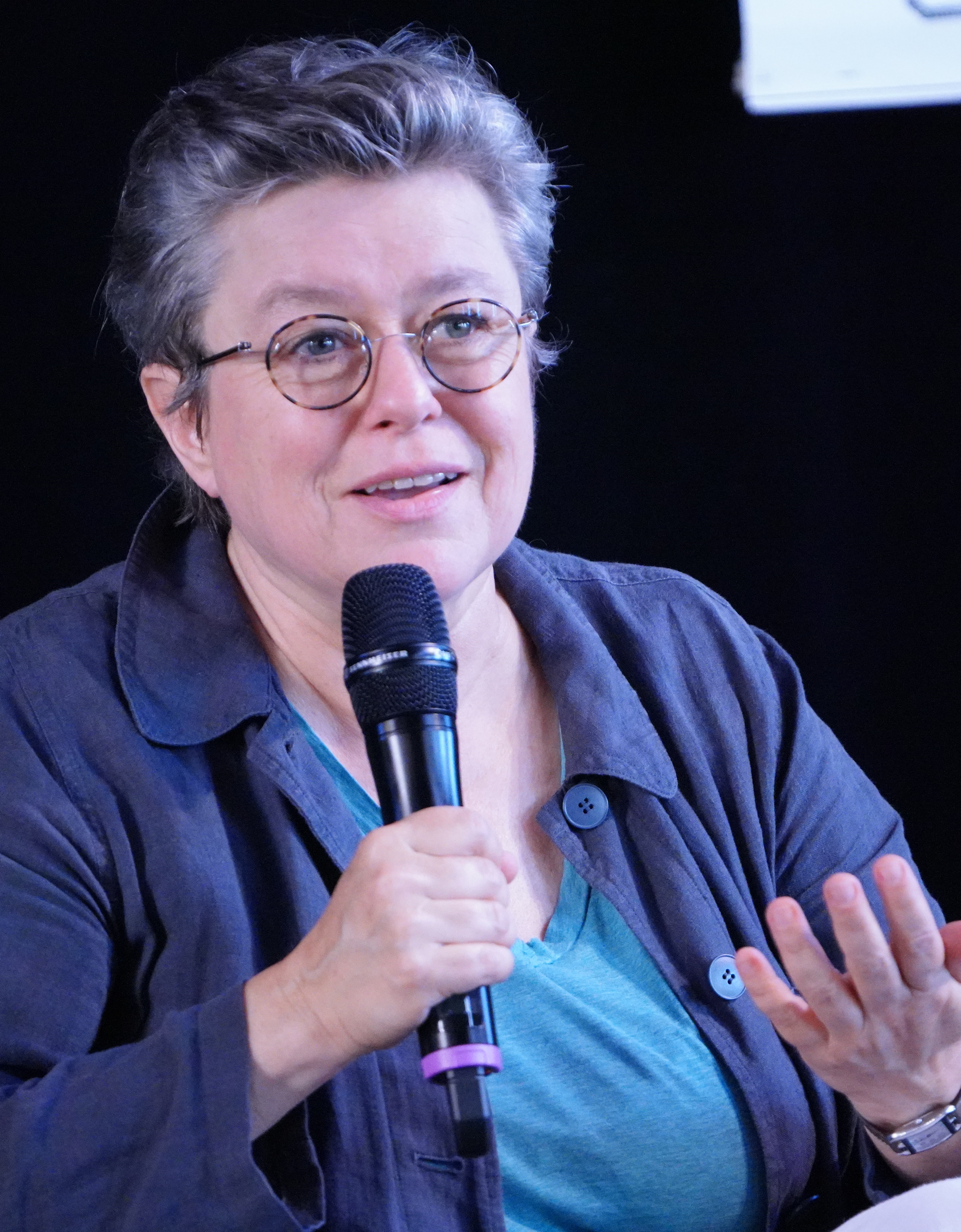
Murat in 2023

Laure Murat, born 4 June 1967, in Paris, is a French historian, writer, and professor at the University of California, Los Angeles.

== Biography ==
Murat is the daughter of the writer and film producer Napoléon Murat and historian Inès d'Albert de Luynes.

In 1986, she began her career as a journalist first at Beaux-Arts Magazine, and then at l'Objet d'art, before spending a year at Profession politique. She subsequently worked as a freelance journalist for several notable reviews (Connaissance des arts, Muséart, les Aventures de l'art, and l'Œil, among others), supplements (Le Monde de la révolution française), and radio shows (Radio Aligre and France-Culture).

In 1997, she was invited by the École nationale supérieure des Beaux-Arts to give a seminar on the theory of art criticism.

In 2004, she wrote a thesis, Le troisième sexe: Du mythe de l’androgyne à l’invention du neutre, for the Diplôme de l'EHESS. She earned the degree with honours, which permitted her to proceed directly to her doctoral dissertation.

In 2006, she defended her dissertation on L’invention du troisième sexe: Sexes et genres dans l’histoire culturelle (1835–1939) and earned her PhD. Her committee was composed of Françoise Gaspard, Dominique Kalifa, Michelle Perrot, Christophe Prochasson (her advisor), Denise Riley, and Joan Scott.

The same year, she was hired as a professor in the Department of French and Francophone Studies (now the Department of European Languages and Transcultural Studies) at UCLA. She currently serves as the department's Vice Chair of Graduate Studies.

From 2015 to 2019, she served as director of the UCLA Center for European and Russian Studies. In 2022, she was named distinguished professor.

== Research ==
Murat's research focuses on three main areas. Her first area of research is the history of psychiatry in France in the 19th century. In 2001, she published La maison du docteur Blanche, an investigation into private psychiatry before the invention of psychoanalysis, based on the unpublished records of an asylum that treated Nerval and Maupassant, among others. In 2011, she published L'homme qui se prenait pour Napoléon (translated in English in 2014 as The Man Who Thought He Was Napoleon), which examines the vast body of archives of the public asylums located in the former French administrative département de la Seine for the years 1789–1871. She questions the nature of delirium in the 19th century in order to understand the impact of political events (revolutions, regime changes, etc.) on madness. This political history of madness attempts to show the extent to which psychiatry, a science still in its infancy that was at the whims of an often-changing government, interpreted mental illness and rendered it a social phenomenon.

Her second field of research is cultural history, particularly of literature. In 2003, she published Passage de l'Odéon, devoted to Adrienne Monnier and Sylvia Beach, inventors of the modern bookstore in the interwar period and publishers of James Joyce's Ulysses. In 2015, she published Relire as an investigation of rereading, after conducting a series of interviews with writers in France (Annie Ernaux, Patrick Chamoiseau, Jean Echenoz, Christine Angot, etc.).

Her third area of research touches on questions of gender and sexuality. In 2006, she published La loi du genre, a study based on her dissertation research that further explores the concept of the "third sex." In 2018, she published Une révolution sexuelle ? Réflexions sur l'après-Weinstein, which examined the MeToo movement.

In the course of her research, Murat has also written many articles on Marcel Proust. While in the police archives in 2005, she discovered a report from the vice squad attesting to the presence of Proust in a gay brothel that was run by Albert Le Cuziat, who served as the inspiration for Jupien in In Search of Lost Time. This discovery was followed by several further studies, notably in Proust et ses amis, La Nouvelle Revue Française, and the Romanic Review. In the year of Proust's centenary (2021–2022), she contributed to the Cahiers de l'Herne, the exhibition catalog Marcel Proust, un roman parisien at the Carnavalet Museum, and the exhibition catalog Marcel Proust, la fabrique de l'œuvre at the Bibliothèque nationale de France. On 15 November 2022, she participated in an episode of the L'heure bleue podcast dedicated to Proust, which was presented by Laure Adler and titled "La Recherche est un livre de consolation".

== Public engagement ==
Murat regularly intervenes in the public sphere on social issues, especially since the advent of the MeToo movement and the controversies around cancel culture, about which she wrote a short book in 2022, titled Qui annule quoi?. Her perspective on these issues is informed by her deep knowledge of both French and American cultures, as shown by her articles in Le Monde and Libération, for the latter of whom she wrote the "Historiques" column between 2016 and 2019 alongside Sophie Wahnich, Johann Chapoutot, and Serge Gruzinski.

== Publications ==
- 1992: Grandes demeures de France (with photographs by Roberto Schezen). Arthaud.
- 1992: Palais de la nation (with photographs by Georges Fessy). Flammarion. ISBN 978-2-08-201847-0
- 1996: Paris des écrivains (editor). Paris: Éditions du Chêne. ISBN 978-2-85108-909-0
- 1998: L'expédition d'Égypte: le rêve oriental de Bonaparte (with Nicolas Weill). Éditions Gallimard, Découvertes Gallimard series, vol. 343. ISBN 978-2-07-053399-2
- 2001: La maison du docteur Blanche: histoire d’un asile et de ses pensionnaires, de Nerval à Maupassant. JC Lattès. ISBN 978-2-7096-2088-8
- 2003: Passage de l’Odéon: Sylvia Beach, Adrienne Monnier et la vie littéraire à Paris dans l’entre-deux-guerres. Fayard, Histoire de la Pensée series. ISBN 978-2-213-61662-9
- 2006: La loi du genre: une histoire culturelle du troisième sexe. Fayard, Histoire de la Pensée series. ISBN 978-2-213-62042-8
- 2010: Zoé, la nuit (under the pseudonym Iris Castor, with Zrinka Stahuljak). Paris, JC Lattès, Thrillers series. ISBN 978-2-7096-3024-5
- 2011: L'homme qui se prenait pour Napoléon: pour une histoire politique de la folie. Éditions Gallimard, Hors Série Connaissance series. ISBN 978-2-07-078664-0
- 2015: Relire: enquête sur une passion littéraire. Paris: Flammarion, Essais Littéraires series. ISBN 978-2-08-134728-1
- 2015: Flaubert à la Motte-Picquet. Flammarion, Essais Littéraires series. ISBN 978-2-08-134776-2
- 2016: Ceci n'est pas une ville. Flammarion, Essais Littéraires series. ISBN 978-2-08-137708-0
- 2023: Proust: roman familial. Éditions Robert Laffont. ISBN 978-2-221-27130-8

== Awards ==
Year	Nominated work	Award	Category	Result	Ref.
2001	La maison du docteur Blanche	Prix Goncourt	Biographie	Winner	
2001	La maison du docteur Blanche	Prix de l'Académie Française	Critique	Winner	
2011	L'homme qui se prenait pour Napoléon	Prix Femina essai	—	Winner	
2023	Proust: roman familial	Prix Goncourt	—	Longlisted	
