= Shakespeare and Company (1919–1941) =

Bookstore in Paris founded by Sylvia Beach in 1919

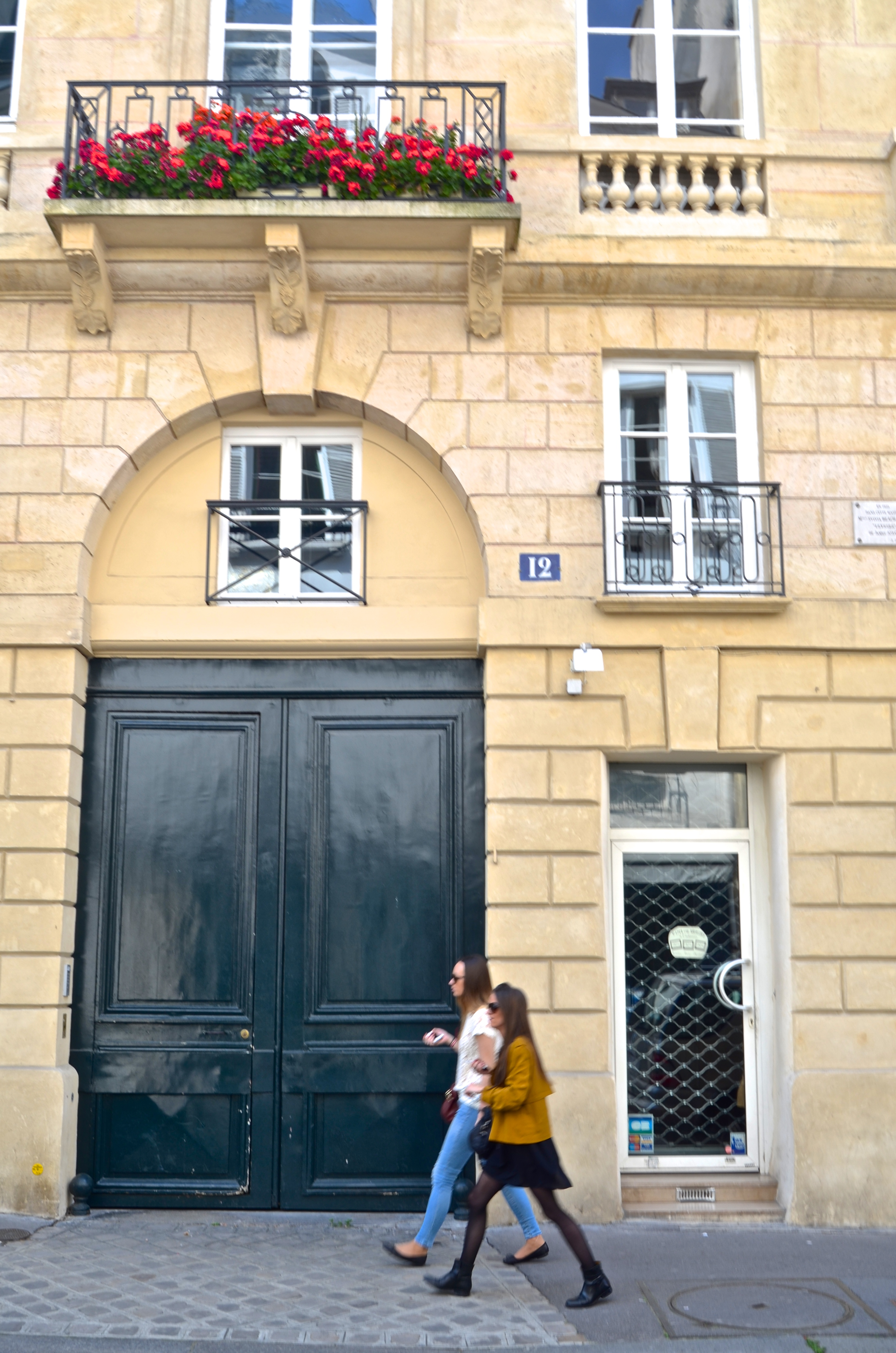
- 12 Rue de l'Odéon, Paris, location of the now-defunct Shakespeare and Company, with memorial plaque partially visible on the far right
- Interactive map of Shakespeare and Company
- Location: 12 Rue de l'Odéon, Paris, France
- Type: Bookseller and publisher

Construction
- Opened: November 19, 1919
- Closed: 1941

Shakespeare and Company was an influential English-language bookstore in Paris founded by Sylvia Beach in 1919; Beach published James Joyce's 1922 novel Ulysses at the bookstore. The store closed in 1941.

Shakespeare and Company was established by Beach, an American expatriate, in November 1919, at 8 rue Dupuytren, before moving to larger premises at 12 rue de l'Odéon in the 6th arrondissement in 1921. During the 1920s, Beach's shop and lending library was a gathering place for many then-aspiring and renowned writers and poets such as Ezra Pound, Ernest Hemingway, Djuna Barnes, James Joyce, F. Scott Fitzgerald, Gertrude Stein, and Ford Madox Ford.Shakespeare and Company was forced to close in 1941 during the German occupation of Paris. Beach was arrested and imprisoned for six months by Nazi authorities. Upon her release toward the end of the war, Beach was in ill health and was never able to reopen the store.

== History ==
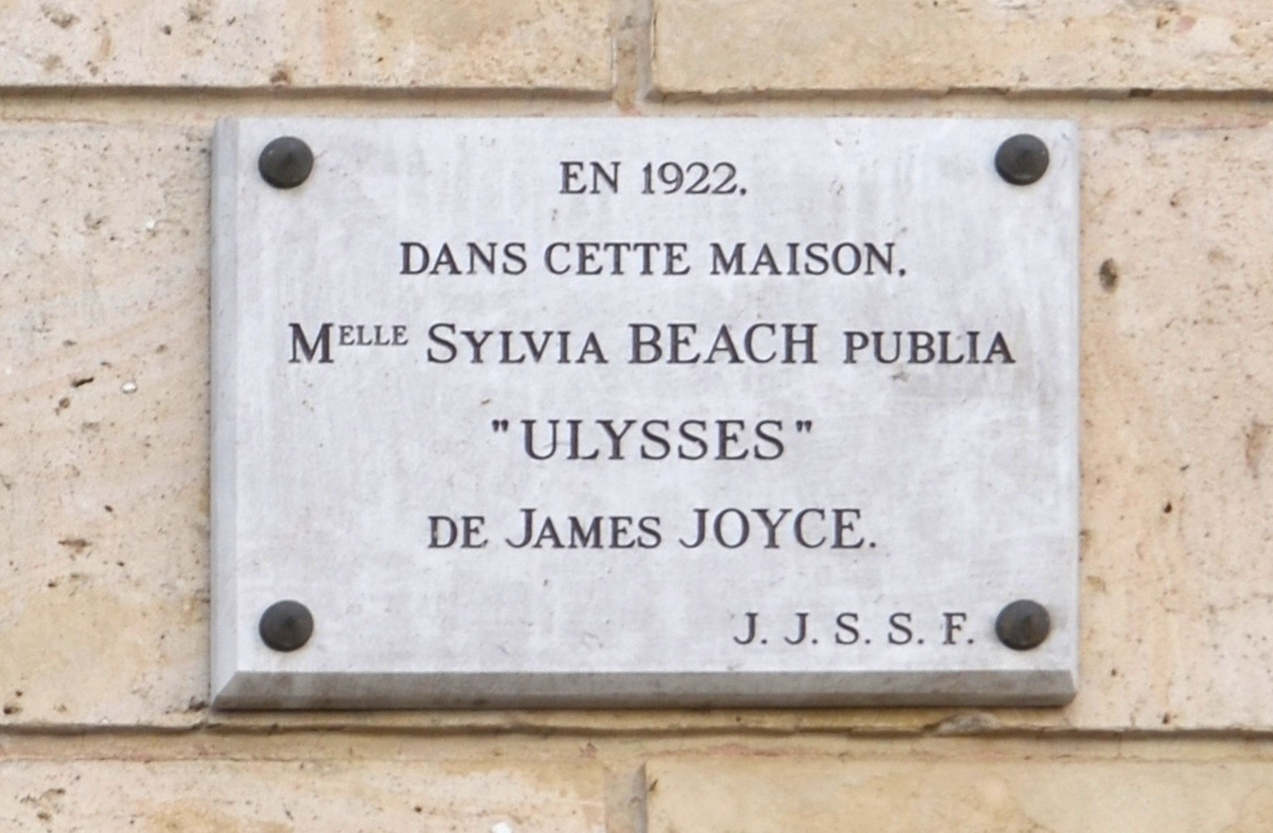
Plaque at 12 Rue de l'Odéon, Paris VI, which reads "In 1922, in this house, Mlle. Sylvia Beach published Ulysses by James Joyce."

Sylvia Beach, an American expatriate from New Jersey, established Shakespeare and Company on 19 November 1919, at 8 rue Dupuytren. Feminist novelist Annie Winifred Ellerman, who wrote under the pseudonym Bryher, helped fund the bookstore with an inheritance from her father, shipping magnate Sir John Ellerman.

The store functioned as a lending library as well as a bookstore. In 1921, Beach moved it to a larger location at 12 rue de l'Odéon, where it remained until 1941. During this period, the store was the center of Anglo-American literary culture and modernism in Paris. Writers and artists of the Lost Generation, such as Ernest Hemingway and F. Scott Fitzgerald, as well as Ezra Pound, Gertrude Stein, George Antheil, Djuna Barnes, Mina Loy, and Man Ray, among others, spent a great deal of time there.

The shop was nicknamed "Stratford-on-Odéon" by James Joyce, who used it as his office; Noël Riley Fitch wrote that Shakespeare and Company was a "meeting place, clubhouse, post office, money exchange, and reading room for the famous and soon-to-be famous of the avant garde". Its books were considered high quality and reflected Beach's own taste. The store and its literary denizens are mentioned in Hemingway's A Moveable Feast. Patrons could buy or borrow books like D. H. Lawrence's controversial Lady Chatterley's Lover, which had been banned in Britain and the United States.

Beach published Joyce's controversial book Ulysses in 1922. It, too, was banned in the United States and Britain. Later editions were also published under the Shakespeare and Company imprint. She also encouraged the publication, in 1923, and sold copies of Hemingway's first book, Three Stories and Ten Poems.

At her bookstore, historic figures made rare appearances, readings of their work: Paul Valery, Andre Gide, and T.S. Eliot; Hemingway even broke his rule of not reading in public if Stephen Spender would read with him, and Spender agreed, so Hemingway appeared for a rare reading in public with Stephen Spender.

Shakespeare and Company closed in December 1941 during the German occupation of France in World War II. It has been suggested that it may have been ordered to shut because Beach denied a German officer the last copy of Joyce's Finnegans Wake.
