= Groupe Flammarion =

French publisher

- Parent company: Groupe Madrigall
- Founded: 1876
- Founder: Ernest Flammarion
- Country of origin: France
- Headquarters location: Café Voltaire, Paris
- Publication types: Books, Magazines
- Imprints: Autrement, Casterman, J'ai Lu, Jungle
- Official website: editions.flammarion.com

Groupe Flammarion (French: [gʁup flamaʁjɔ̃]) is a French publishing group, comprising many units, including its namesake, founded in 1876 by Ernest Flammarion, as well as units in distribution, sales, printing and bookshops (La Hune and Flammarion Center). Flammarion became part of the Italian media conglomerate RCS MediaGroup in 2000. Éditions Gallimard acquired Flammarion from RCS MediaGroup in 2012. Subsidiaries include Casterman. Its headquarters in Paris are in the building that was the former Café Voltaire (named in honour of the writer and philosopher Voltaire), located on the Place de l'Odeon in the current 6th arrondissement of Paris.

Flammarion is a subsidiary of Groupe Madrigall, the third largest French publishing group.

== History ==
Ernest Flammarion successfully launched his family publishing venture in 1875 with the Treaty of Popular Astronomy of his brother, astronomer Camille Flammarion. The firm published Émile Zola, Maupassant, and Jules Renard, as well as Hector Malot, Colette, and a wide list of medical, scientific, geographical, historical works as well as various autobiographies, including also the Père Castor children's series.

One of its early commercial successes was Édouard Drumont's virulent antisemitic tract La France juive ("Jewish France"), which Flammarion published in 1886 and reissued several times. During the Nazi occupation it reissued the book as recently as 1943.

In October 2000, the Flammarion family sold its shares to the Italian group RCS MediaGroup, which took control of the company.

In 2026, the publishing house launched a new pocket-sized crime collection entitled 'Au grand jour', headed by Pauline Kipfer.

== Awards and distinctions ==
In 2018, the company won the Mention Honorifique from Les Rencontres Philosophiques de Monaco for the Collection GF Corpus / Philosophie.

The GF Corpus / Philosophie Collection is a catalogue of works of philosophy and literature published by the Groupe Flammarion. It was founded in 1964 by Jean Garnier and Henri Flammarion, who used the combined initials of their surnames to name it GF. At the time of the award in 2018, the collection comprised about 1000 works as well as numerous translations of classics. Today the collection contains over 1350 works of philosophy and classic literature, including translations. (Note: The Groupe Flammarion catalogue shows 1352 items in the search results for the GF collection, as accessed on 8 August 2026.)

== Imprints ==
- Arthaud
- Aubier (psychology, psychoanalysis, psychiatry, history)
- Autrement
- Baam!
- Casterman
- Champs (paperback series: arts, biography, classics, history, politics, essays)
- Chan-Ok
- Climats
- Etonnants Classiques (paperback series: "Astonishing Classics")
- Flammarion
- Flammarion Jeunesse
- Flammarion Québec
- GF (paperback seriesmore than 1350 titles of science, philosophy, and history)
- J'ai Lu
- Jungle Editions
- KSTR
- La Maison Rustique
- Librio
- Père Castor
- Pygmalion
- Pygmalion Fantasy
- Sakka
- Skira-Flammarion

== See also ==
- Café Voltaire
- Place de l'Odeon
- Revue Passager (a biannual, bilingual magazine/book distributed by Groupe Flammarion to libraries and bookstores in France)
