= Shari Benstock =

Feminist literary scholar

Shari Gabrielson Goodmann
- Born: December 2, 1944; San Diego, California, U.S.
- Died: May 26, 2015
- Occupations: Literary critic, English department chair and associate dean of faculty affairs at the University of Miami
- Writing career
- Genre: Feminist literature

Shari Gabrielson Goodmann (December 2, 1944 – May 26, 2015), who published under the name Shari Benstock, was chairperson of the English department and associate dean for faculty affairs at the University of Miami and a feminist literary scholar. She was an expert on literary modernism, and a biographer of Edith Wharton.

== Early life and education ==
Shari Gabrielson was born in San Diego on December 2, 1944, the daughter of Dana and Myrl (Barth) Gabrielson. She grew up in Iowa and was educated at Luther College, Drake University, and Kent State University.

== Career ==
=== Writing and editing work ===
She edited Tulsa Studies in Women's Literature from 1983 until 1986. With Celeste Schenck, she established Reading Women Writing at Cornell University Press, one of the first book series dedicated to women's writing and feminist scholarship. In 1986, she published Women of the Left Bank, which explores the lives and works of several American, English, and French women among the Paris expatriate literary scene, including Gertrude Stein, Alice B. Toklas, Sylvia Beach, Adrienne Monnier, Djuna Barnes, Natalie Clifford Barney, H.D., and Bryher.

=== University of Miami ===
In 1986, she left the University of Tulsa for the University of Miami, where she was a faculty member until 2006. She founded the University of Miami's program in Women's and Gender Studies and served as chairperson of the University of Miami's English department and as associate dean for faculty affairs for the university's College of Arts and Sciences.

== Personal life ==
Benstock married Mel Shyvers, with whom she had a son, Eric. She subsequently married Bernard Benstock, a James Joyce scholar, who died in 1994. In 2004, she married Thomas Goodmann, associate professor of English at the University of Miami, who cared for her in the last decade of her life during which she suffered from early-onset dementia.

== Works ==
- Who's He When He's at Home: A James Joyce Directory, 1980 (with Bernard Benstock)
- Women of the Left Bank: Paris, 1900-1940, 1986
- The Private Self: Theory and Practice of Women's Autobiographical Writings, 1988 (editor)
- Coping With Joyce: Essays from the Copenhagen Symposium, 1989 (editor with Morris Beja)
- “No Gifts from Chance”: A Biography of Edith Wharton, 1994 (editor)
- On Fashion, 1994 (editor with Suzanne Ferriss)
- The House of Mirth by Edith Wharton, 1994 (editor)
- Footnotes: On Shoes, 2001 (editor with Suzanne Ferriss)
- A Handbook of Literary Feminism, 2002 (with Suzanne Ferriss)
