= Noël Riley Fitch =

American historian (born 1937)

- Noël Riley Fitch in Venice, Italy 2010
- Born: 1937 (age 88–89); New Haven, Connecticut, U.S.
- Occupation: Writer
- Writing career
- Notable work: Appetite for Life: The Biography of Julia Child

Noël Riley Fitch (born 1937) is an American biographer and historian of expatriate intellectuals in Paris in the first half of the 20th century. She is the author of several books on Paris (Literary Cafes of Paris, Walks in Hemingway's Paris) as well as three biographies: Sylvia Beach and the Lost Generation (1983), translated into Japanese, Spanish, German, Italian and French; Anaïs: The Erotic Life of Anaïs Nin (1993), published in French, German, Spanish, Portuguese, and Polish, and nominated for the Grand prix des lectrices de Elle; and she is the first authorized biographer of Julia Child, with Appetite for Life: the Biography of Julia Child (1997). The Ernest Hemingway book, a biographical and geographical study of his Paris years, has been published in Dutch, the Cafés of Paris book in Dutch and German.

== Early life ==
Fitch was born in 1937 in New Haven, Connecticut, to New England parents (John E. Riley and Dorcas Tarr) and raised with two younger sisters in the Snake River Valley in Idaho. She has lived in Quincy, Massachusetts; in Pasadena, La Jolla and Los Angeles, California; and in Paris, France. Her writing career began when she was a columnist for her high school and college school papers; but it was in graduate school that she discovered the story of Sylvia Beach's bookshop on the Left Bank of Paris and decided she would tell the story of Sylvia Beach, her bookshop Shakespeare and Company (1919–1942), and the publication of James Joyce's Ulysses (the 1922 novel that would change world fiction). Since then, every book Fitch has written has some connection with Paris and the artists who lived and worked there, including her biographies of Beach, Nin, and Child.

== Career ==
In June 2011, Noel Riley Fitch was awarded the prestigious Prix de la Tour Montparnasse literary award in France for her book Sylvia Beach: Une américaine à Paris (Perrin Publishers 2011), the French translation by Elizabeth Danger of Noel's widely acclaimed 1983 book Sylvia Beach and the Lost Generation.

Her book Appetite for Life: The Biography of Julia Child (1997) was written with Child's full cooperation and exclusive authorization. Publishers Weekly said the book is written "warmly and compellingly." Kirkus Reviews called its "details ... exquisite" and the story "exhaustively researched, charming." Entertainment Weekly named it number five of the ten best books of the year.

Following her earlier Literary Cafés of Paris, Fitch returned to the travel genre to author The Grand Literary Cafés of Europe (London, 2006; US, 2007). Covering the history of coffee and the coffeehouse, the book features nearly 40 cafes in 20 countries. Paris Café: The Sélect Crowd, co-authored with illustrator Rick Tulka, was published November 2007.

Fitch appears in several documentary films, including Portrait of a Bookstore as an Old Man, Berenice Abbott: A View of the Twentieth Century (1992), Paris: The Luminous Years (PBS 2010) and the A&E Biography of Julia Child, first shown October 14, 1997 and based on her book, Appetite for Life.

Fitch earned a Ph.D. from Washington State University and has taught at Point Loma Nazarene University, San Diego State University, University of Southern California, and the American University of Paris. She is presently writing the story of the Irish woman Louison O'Morphi, mistress of Louis XV of France, model for Rococo painter François Boucher, and subject of a chapter in Giacomo Casanova's memoirs.

Fitch recently retired from lecturing at both the University of Southern California and the American University of Paris. She and her husband live in Los Angeles, Paris, and New York City. She has one daughter.

== Noël Riley Fitch Collections ==
Firestone Princeton University Library
Manuscript Division
Noël Riley Fitch Papers-C0841 1858-2011 (mostly 1965–1995)
Consists of the writings, correspondence, interviews, printed works, and other additional papers of the American educator and author Noël Riley Fitch (1937-). Also included are a selection of Sylvia Beach papers that Fitch consulted for her book Sylvia Beach and the Lost Generation: A History of Literary Paris in the Twenties and Thirties (1983).

- Firestone Princeton University Library

The University of Texas at Austin
Harry Ransom Humanities Research Center
Noël Riley Fitch an inventory of her papers G11541, G12152
The collection contains Fitch's research, from inception to culmination, for the 1993 publication of the biography, Anaïs: The Erotic Life of Anaïs Nin.

- The University of Texas at Austin

New York University
Fales Library and Special Collections
Elmer Holmes Bobst Library
Guide to the Noël Riley Fitch Julia Child Papers 1912 - 2011 MSS 323
The Noël Riley Fitch Julia Child Papers consists largely of material related to the research, production, and reception of the best selling book Appetite for Life: The Biography of Julia Child.

- New York University

Southern Illinois University
Special Collections Research Center
The Noël Riley Fitch Collection of Henry Miller, 1987-1993 1/1/MSS 270
The collection consists of correspondence, reviews of "Significant Other" and a manuscript of "A Literate Passion: letters of Anaïs Nin and Henry Miller".

- Southern Illinois University

== Works ==
=== Books ===
- Sylvia Beach and the Lost Generation: A History of Literary Paris in the Twenties and Thirties. (1983)
- Faith and Imagination: Essays on Evangelicals and Literature (Edited with Richard W. Etulain, 1985)
- Hemingway in Paris: Parisian Walks for the Literary Traveller (1989)
- Literary Cafés of Paris (1989)
- Walks in Hemingway's Paris (1990)
- Anaïs: the Erotic Life of Anaïs Nin (1993)
- Appetite for Life: The Biography of Julia Child (1997)
- Literary Cafés of Paris (Second edition, 2005)
- The Grand Literary Cafés of Europe (2006)
- Paris Café: Sélect Crowd (2007)
- The Letters of Sylvia Beach (preface, 2009)
- Sylvia Beach: Une américaine à Paris (2011)

=== Periodicals ===
- "Child in Paris," Paris Notes. Cover essay. March, 2007
- "Notre Dame de la cuisine and the Prince des Gastronomes," Gastronomica; The Journal of Food and Culture. Summer, 2005: 73–79. caliber.ucpress.net/doi/abs/10.1525/gfc.2005.5.3.73
- "America honors its favorite 'French Chef'," International Herald Tribune 24 July 2003, Thursday, 9.
- "A Writer's Secret Place," Michigan Quarterly Review. Spring 2000. pp 451–52.
- "Beach, Sylvia Woodbridge," American National Biography. ACLS. Oxford Univ.Press, 2000. pp. 389–90.
- "A New Beginning for Julia Child," AIWF Newsletter 13 (June 1999): 3.
- "This is Everybody's Life" and "When 'Biography' Calls," Los Angeles Times Calendar (26 April 1998): 4–5, 95–96.
- "Life Lessons from Julia Child," Bottom Line: Tomorrow. 6.4 (April 1998) 1–2.
- "A Dramatic Encounter at Louveciennes, 1990," in Anaïs Nin: A Book of Mirrors. Ed. Paul Herron. MI: Sky Blue Press, 1996, pp. 21–24.
- "Julia: The Book," American Institute of Wine and Food Newsletter (Aug.96): 3.
- "The Crisco Kid," Los Angeles Magazine (August 1996): 82–84.
- "Sylvia Beach: Commerce, Sanctification, and Art on the Left Bank," in A Living of Words: American Women in Print Culture. Ed. Susan Albertine. Knoxville: Univ. of Tennessee Press, 1995, pp. 189–206.
- "The Literate Passion of Anaïs Nin and Henry Miller" in Significant Others: Creativity and Intimate Partnership. Eds. Whitney Chadwick & Isabelle de Courtivron. London: Thames & Hudson, 1993, pp. 154–171.
- "Djuna Barnes" in American Writers Supplement III. New York: Scribners, 1993.
- "The Elusive 'Seamless Whole': A Biographer Treats (or Fails to Treat) Lesbianism" in Lesbian Texts and Contexts: Radical Revisions. Eds. Karla Jay & Joanne Glasgow. New York: New York University Press, 1990, 59-69 pp.
- "Introduction" to In transition: A Paris Anthology. New York: Doubleday; London: Weidenfeld & Nicolson, 1990, 11-16 pp.
- "La Communion Gastronomique" in L'honnete Volupte: Lettre International. Paris: Editions Michel de maule. December 1989, pp. 86–88.
- ""Bohemian Paris," Paris Magazine. Summer, 1989. Special Bicentennary Edition, pp. 3–5.
- "L'Entente de la Vie," Arete. Vol. 2, issue 1 (July/Aug. 1989), pp. 80–85.
- "The First Ulysses" in James Joyce: The Augmented Ninth. Ed. Bernard Benstock. Syracuse Univ. Press, 1988, pp. 349–61.
- "The Banality of Genius," James Joyce Literary Supplement. No. 3 (spring 1988): 13.
- "Paris was matria and sororitas," James Joyce Literary Supplement. No. 1 (May 1987): 8–9.
- "The Cover," Journal of Library Science. Vol. 21, No. 3 (summer 1986): 600–03.
- "The Failure of Spiritual Values in Henry James's The Aspern Papers" and "The Christian as Catcher: On Reading Secular Literature" in Faith and Imagination. Albuquerque, New Mexico: Far West Books, 1985: 91–101, 13–19.
- "Sylvia Beach," Americans in Paris, 1920–1939, Vol. 4, Dictionary of Literary Biography. Detroit: Gale Research, 1980: 28–37.
- "Voyage to Ithaca: William Carlos Williams in Paris," The Princeton University Library Chronicle AL (spring 1979): 193–214.
- "Ernest Hemingway c/o Shakespeare & Company," Fitzgerald/Hemingay Annual 1977 (Detroit: Brucolli/Clark Research, 1977): 157–181.
- "A Decade of Women: A Perspective from Mexico City," Wittenburg Door Vol. 26 (Aut./Sept 1975): 18–19.
- "Sylvia Beach's Shakespeare and Company: Port of Call for American Expatriate," Research Studies. Vol. 33, No. 5 (Dec. 1965): 197–207.

== Biographical sources ==
International Authors & Writers Who's Who

- Who's Who in the West & Who's Who in Calif
- Who's Who of American Women
- Who's Who in the World
- The Authors Guild (The Authors League of America)
- Directory of American Scholars
- Contemporary Authors
- Who's Who Historical Society
- Directory of Women in American Studies
- Usc.edu
