= Café Voltaire =

Historical cafe in Paris

Coordinates: 48.85004°N 2.33903°E

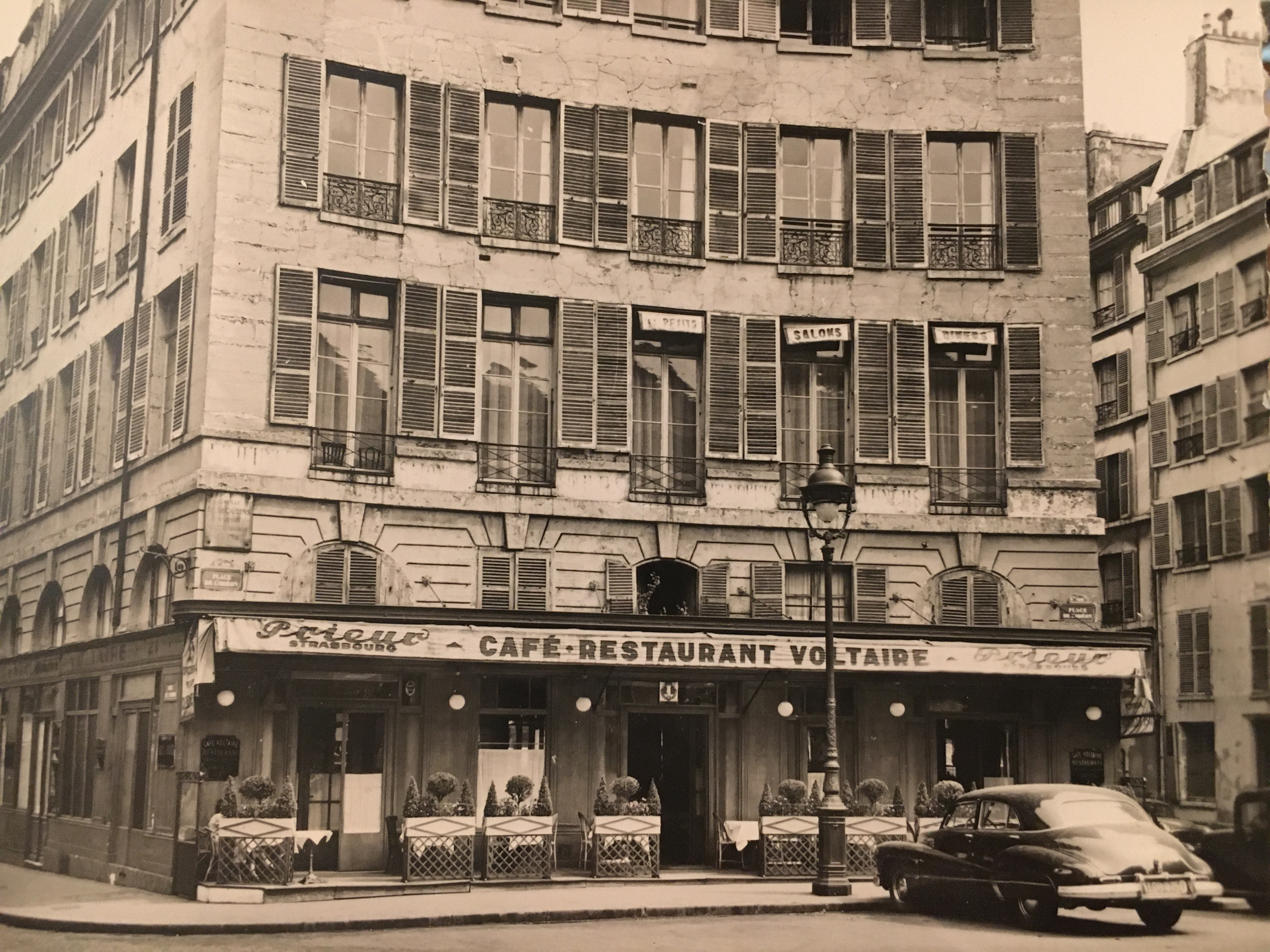
- Café Voltaire
- Interactive map of Café Voltaire

Restaurant information
- Location: Place de l'Odéon, Paris, France

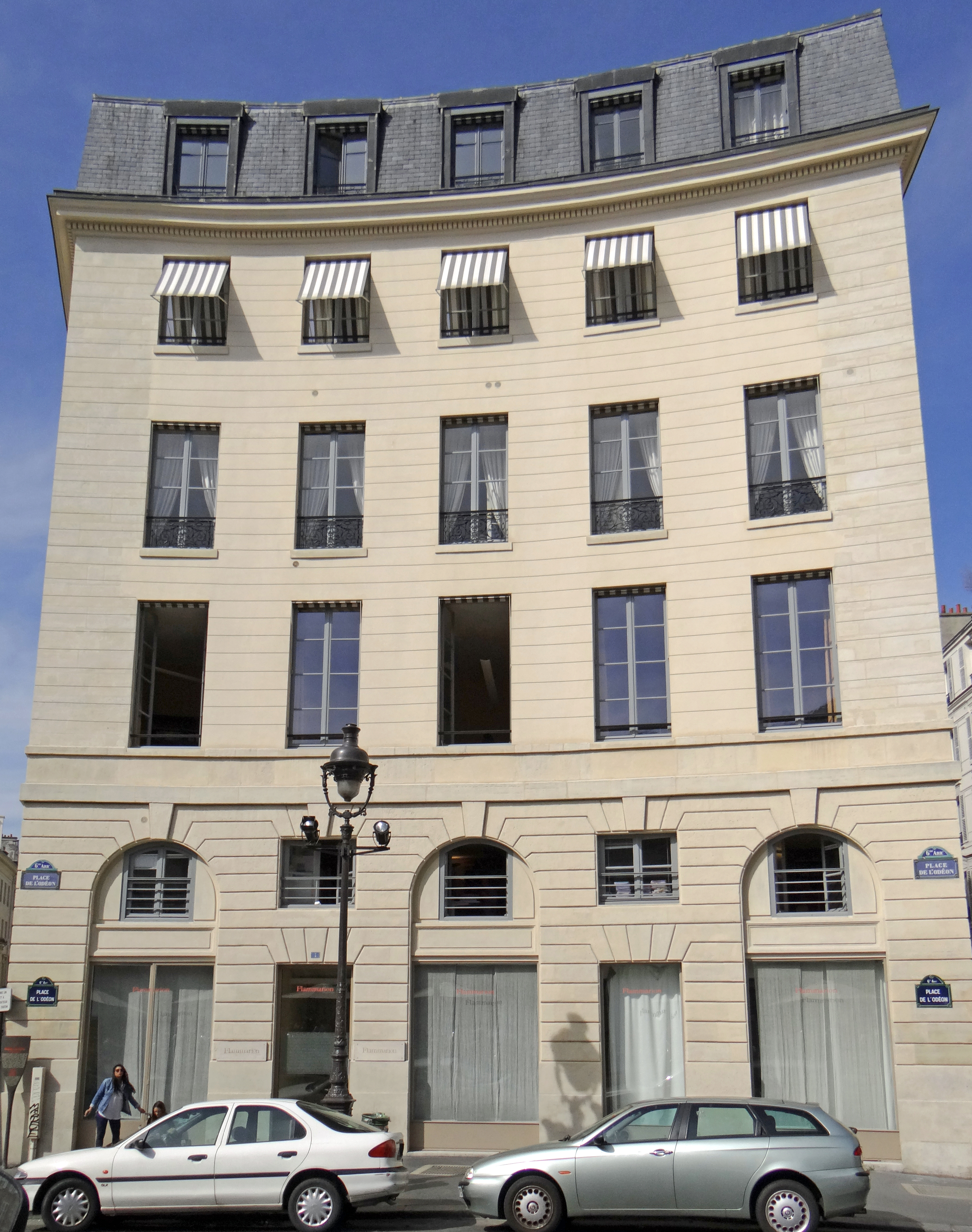
Paris - Place de l'Odéon - Immeuble n°1

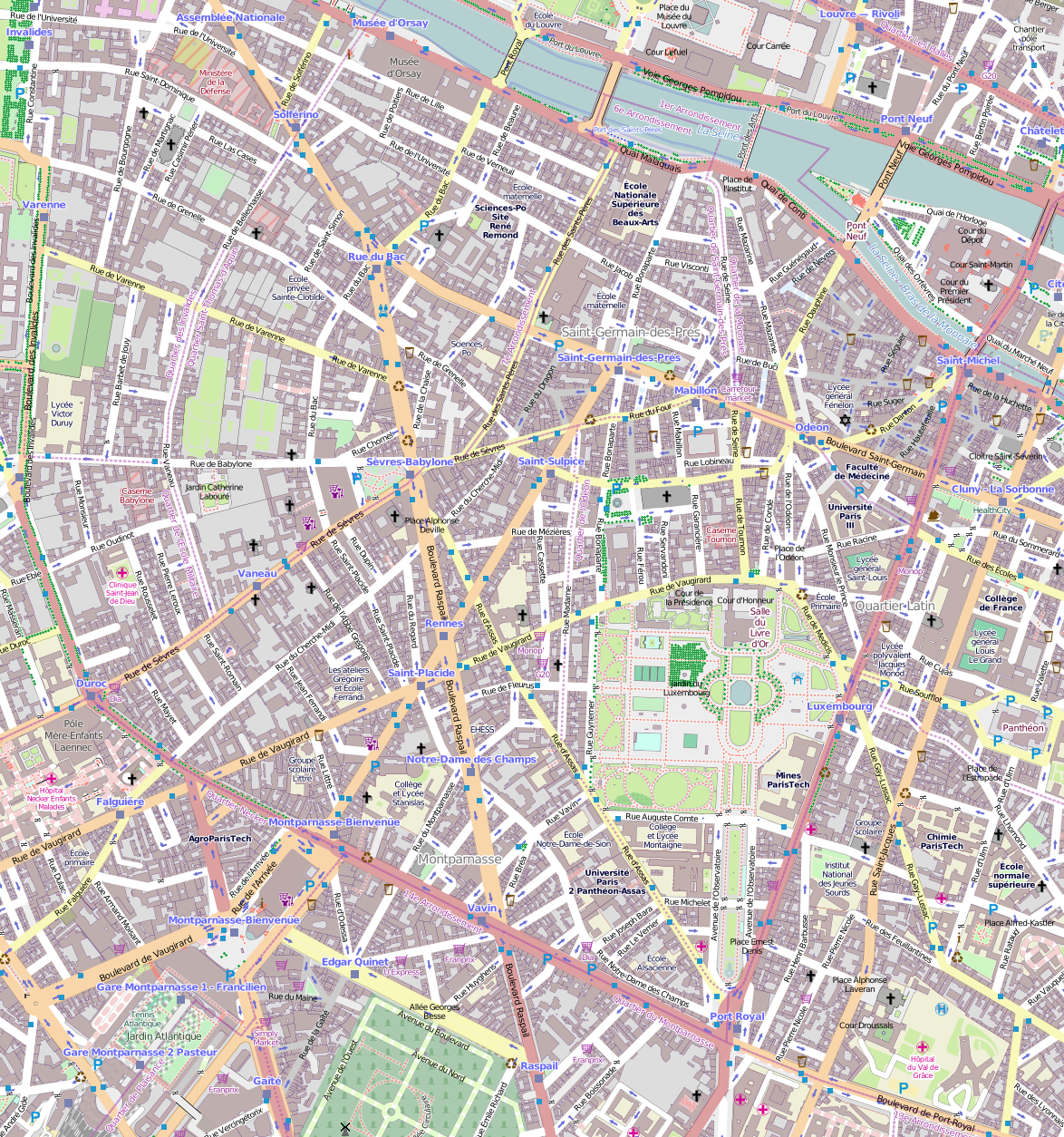
6e Arrondissement, Paris, France - OpenStreetMap

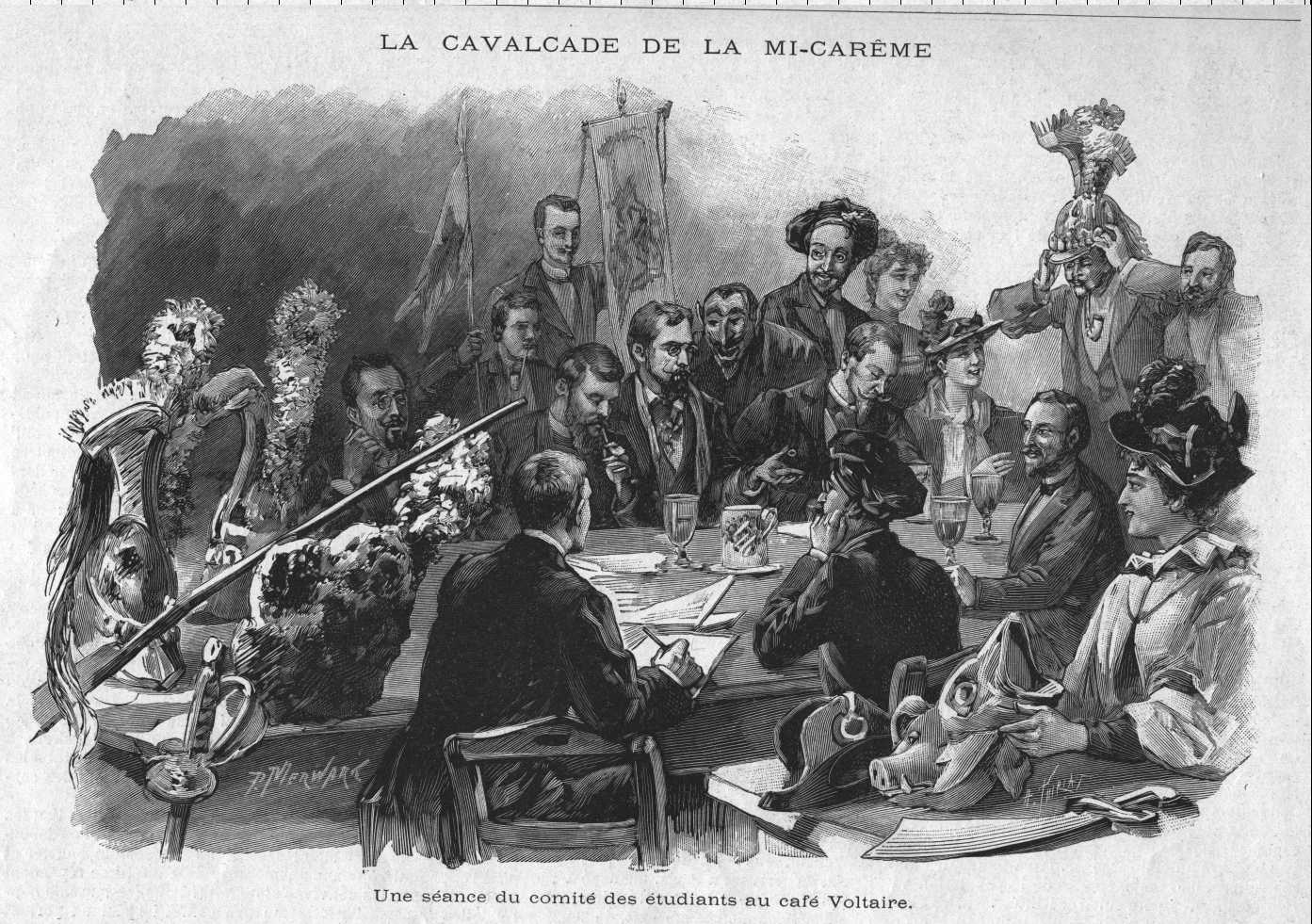
Le comité des étudiants, préparant la Mi-Carême 1894, au café Voltaire, à Paris

Café Voltaire, named after the writer and philosopher Voltaire, was a former café and restaurant located on the Place de l'Odéon in the 6th arrondissement of Paris, France.

The café was open from the early 19th century until the middle of the 20th century. It served as a gathering place for artists and students. The site is currently the headquarters of the literature department of the publishing house Groupe Flammarion (Flammarion Editions).

== Right-bank café ==
Around 1790–1794, historical records show that a Café Voltaire existed in Paris. That café was located on the right bank of the Seine River, in Cours Saint-Martin, near the gate that bears the same name.

== Left-bank establishment ==
The left-bank establishment was located next to the former house of Lucile and Camille Desmoulins who, according to G. Lenotre, lived on the first floor at the time of their arrest for counter-revolutionary conspiracy in 1793. The Place de l'Odéon became the Rue de Voltaire, which later became Rue Casimir-Delavigne in 1864. After the fall of the First Empire, as the Paris Commercial Directory indicates, the establishment took the name Café Voltaire, and was run by a manager named Gache, at least until 1826.

Eugène Delacroix had lunch at the café in May 1824, as indicated by an entry in his Journal. In the year 1837, Café Voltaire was described in Balzac's philosophical study Les Martyrs ignorés. At that time, the district also featured Café Racine (now Bouillon Racine) and Café Molière (near Café Procope). Sorbonne students met in all three establishments.

Charles Philipon illustrated scenes of the Café Voltaire around 1842 in his Museum or comic store. The café had a terrace, a mezzanine, two upper floors, a billiard table, the quality of which Victor Hugo praises in Les Misérables, and celebrated events by "serving the punch". Before 1850, the place was run by a manager named Ronquier, and the theatre opposite gave rise to heated discussions between critics. In 1855, the reading room of Madame Grassot, a former actress, was annexed by the café and transformed into a new room. At the end of the Second Empire, Léon Gambetta and Jules Vallès were regulars there.

Around 1880, Café Voltaire was frequented by senators living nearby, as well as political and literary personalities: Verlaine left debts there, while André Gide, Jean Moréas, Anatole France, Alfred Vallette, and Rachilde were frequent customers. Subsequently, the Symbolist poets took up residence at the café, Gauguin alongside Stéphane Mallarmé, who wore "a Basque beret, an unspeakable mac-farlane and sculpted clogs". The Paris chapter of the Félibriges also met there. In 1894, meetings were held at Café Voltaire by a student committee preparing the procession of the Mi-Carême (mid-Lent) cavalcade in the Paris Carnival.

In the 1920s, the café was frequented by Americans of the Lost Generation.

=== Sale to Groupe Flammarion ===
The café was sold again in 1956, to Groupe Flammarion (Flammarion Editions). A Panel Histoire de Paris pays homage to the Café Voltaire.
