= Sylvia Beach =

American-born bookseller and publisher (1887–1962)

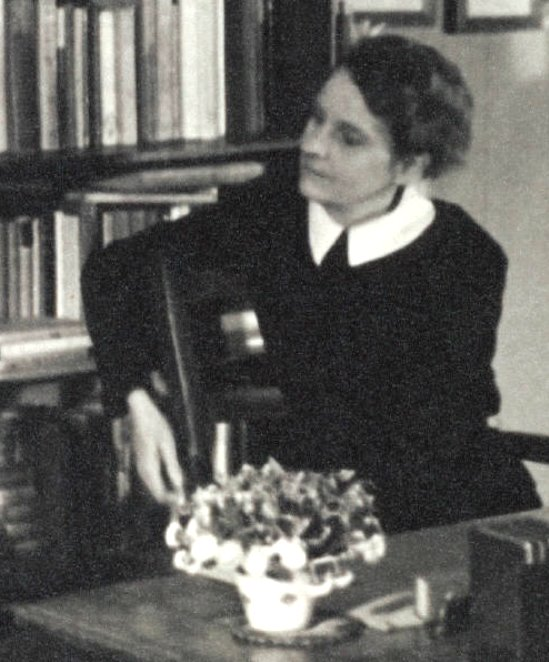
- Beach in 1920
- Born: Nancy Woodbridge Beach; 14 March 1887; Baltimore, Maryland, U.S.
- Died: 5 October 1962 (aged 75); Paris, France
- Occupations: Bookseller; writer; publisher
- Known for: Founder of Shakespeare and Company

Sylvia Beach (14 March 1887 – 5 October 1962), born Nancy Woodbridge Beach, was an American-born bookseller and publisher who lived most of her life in Paris, where she was one of the leading expatriate figures between World War I and II.

She is known for her Paris bookstore, Shakespeare and Company, where she published James Joyce's book Ulysses (1922), and encouraged the publication of and sold copies of Ernest Hemingway's first book, Three Stories and Ten Poems (1923).

== Early life ==
Beach was born in her father's parsonage in Baltimore, Maryland, United States, on 14 March 1887, the second of three daughters of Sylvester Beach and Eleanor Thomazine Orbison. She had an older sister, Holly, and a younger sister, Cyprian. Although named Nancy after her grandmother Orbison, she later decided to change her name to Sylvia. Beach was frail and unhealthy, having chronic headaches that plagued her for the rest of her life. Her maternal grandparents were missionaries to India, and her father, a Presbyterian minister, was descended from several generations of clergymen. Beach's education featured sporadic tutoring, but no formal education. When the girls were young, the family lived in Baltimore and in Bridgeton and Princeton, New Jersey. Then, in 1901, the family moved to France upon Sylvester Beach's appointment as assistant minister of the American Church in Paris and director of the American student center.

Beach spent 1902–1905 in Paris, returning to New Jersey in 1906 when her father became minister of the First Presbyterian Church of Princeton. Beach returned permanently to Paris in 1916 in an effort to escape American Puritanism. She made several return trips to Europe, lived for two years in Spain, and worked for the Balkan Commission of the Red Cross. During the last years of the Great War, she went back to Paris to study contemporary French literature.

== Shakespeare and Company ==
While conducting research at the Bibliothèque Nationale, in a French literary journal Beach read of a lending library and bookshop, La Maison des Amis des Livres (The House of Friends of Books) at 7 rue de l'Odéon, Paris VI. There she was welcomed by the owner, Adrienne Monnier. They later became lovers and lived together for 36 years until Monnier's suicide in 1955.

Inspired by the literary life of the Left Bank and by Monnier's efforts to promote innovative writing, Beach dreamed of starting a branch of Monnier's book shop in New York that would offer contemporary French works to American readers. Her only capital, which her mother gave her from her savings, was not enough to afford such a venture in New York. However, Paris rents were much cheaper and the exchange rates favorable, so with Monnier's help, she opened an English language bookstore and lending library that she named Shakespeare and Company. Monnier had been among the first women in France to found her own bookstore four years before. Beach's bookstore was located at 8 rue Dupuytren, Paris VI. The shop sign featured a portrait of Shakespeare painted by a friend of Monnier's. On either side of the storefront written was written "Lending Library" and "Bookhop", which was misspelled initially.

Shakespeare and Company quickly attracted French and American readers, including aspiring writers to whom Beach offered hospitality, encouragement, and books. As the franc dropped in value and the favorable exchange rate attracted many Americans, her shop flourished and soon needed more space. In May 1921, Shakespeare and Company moved to 12 rue de l'Odéon, across the street from Monnier's Maison des Amis des Livres. Monnier and Beach ran two influential journals from their shops: Le Navire d'Argent and Transition.

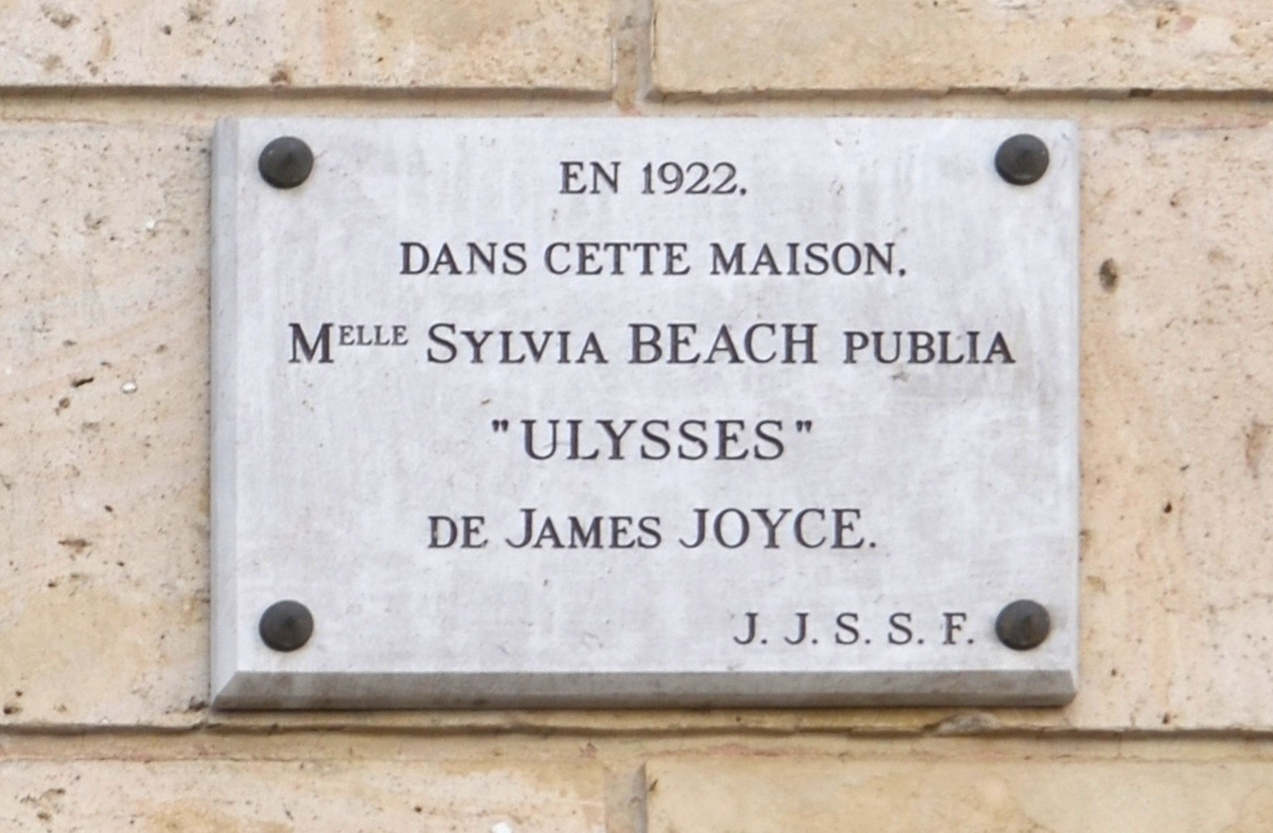
Plaque at 12 Rue de l'Odéon, Paris VI, location of Shakespeare and Company, which reads "In 1922, at this location, Mlle. Sylvia Beach published Ulysses by James Joyce."

In July 1920, Beach met Irish writer James Joyce at a dinner party hosted by French poet André Spire. Soon after, Joyce joined her lending library. Joyce had been trying, unsuccessfully, to publish his manuscript for Ulysses, and Beach offered to publish it. She hired M. Maurice Darantière, a printer from Dijon who did not understand English, to oversee the printing. Shakespeare and Company gained considerable fame after it published Ulysses in 1922, as a result of Joyce's inability to get an edition out in English-speaking countries. In 1932, Joyce sold the publishing rights to Random House for a $45,000 advance. He did not tell Beach of this decision, nor did he offer a portion of the funds. When asked about this, Joyce said: "A baby belongs to its mother, not to the midwife, doesn't it?" Beach was left near bankruptcy after the debt she had bankrolled to publish Ulysses.

Shakespeare and Company experienced financial difficulty throughout the Great Depression of the 1930s but remained supported by wealthy friends, including Bryher. In 1936, when Beach thought she would be forced to close her shop, André Gide organized a group of writers into a club called Friends of Shakespeare and Company. Subscribers paid 200 francs a year to attend readings at the bookstore. Although subscriptions were limited to a select group of 200 people (the maximum number the store could accommodate), the renown of the French and American authors participating in readings during those two years attracted considerable attention to the store. Violette Leduc describes meeting her and the ambiance of the shop in her autobiography La Bâtarde. Shakespeare and Company remained open after the Fall of Paris, but by the end of 1941, she was forced to close it.

During the Nazi invasion of Paris, Beach was watched by the Gestapo for hiding Jewish friends to aid them in escaping the city. She was interned for six months during World War II, briefly at Bois de Bougogne, and then at Vittel, until Tudor Wilkinson secured her release in February 1942. Following her release she occasionally assisted an American member of the French Resistance, Drue Leyton, in sheltering allied airmen shot down in France. Beach kept her books hidden in a vacant apartment upstairs at 12 rue de l'Odeon. Ernest Hemingway symbolically "liberated" the shop in person in 1944, but it never re-opened for business.

== Later life ==
In 1956, Beach wrote Shakespeare and Company, a memoir of the interwar period that details the cultural life of Paris at the time. The book contains first-hand observations of James Joyce, D. H. Lawrence, Ernest Hemingway, Ezra Pound, T. S. Eliot, Valery Larbaud, Thornton Wilder, André Gide, Leon-Paul Fargue, George Antheil, Robert McAlmon, Gertrude Stein, Stephen Vincent Benét, Aleister Crowley, Harry Crosby, Caresse Crosby, John Quinn, Berenice Abbott, Man Ray, and others.

After Monnier's suicide in 1955, Beach had a relationship with Camilla Steinbrugge. In 1959, the Embassy of the United States, Paris, hosted an exhibit titled "The Twenties: American Writers and Their Friends, 1920-1930," which featured Shakespeare and Company's letters, photographs, and first editions. Although Beach's income was modest during the last years of her life, she was widely honored for her publication of Ulysses and her support of aspiring writers during the 1920s. On 16 June 1962, she opened the Martello Tower in Sandycove in Dublin (where the opening scene of Ulysses is set) as a museum. She remained in Paris until her death in 1962 and was buried in Princeton Cemetery. Her papers are archived at Princeton University.

George Whitman opened a new bookshop in 1951 at a different location in Paris (in the rue de la Bûcherie) originally called Le Mistral, but renamed Shakespeare and Company in 1964 in honor of the Beach. Since his death in 2011, it has been run by his daughter Sylvia Whitman.

== Sources ==
- Beach, Sylvia (1991) [1959]. Shakespeare and Company (New ed.). University of Nebraska Press. ISBN 0-8032-6097-0.
- Fitch, Noël Riley (1983). Sylvia Beach and the Lost Generation: A History of Literary Paris in the Twenties and Thirties. W. W. Norton. ISBN 0-393-01713-3.
- Glass, Charles (2009). Americans in Paris: Life and Death Under Nazi Occupation. London: Harper Collins. ISBN 978-0-00-722853-9.
- Griffin, Lynne; McCann, Kelly (1992). The Book of Women. Holbrook, MA: Bob Adams. ISBN 1-55850-106-1.
- Leduc, Violette; Coltman, Derek (2003) [1964]. La Bâtarde. Champaign, IL: Dalkey Archive Press. ISBN 978-1564782892.
- Monnier, Adrienne; McDougall, Richard (1996) [1976]. The Very Rich Hours of Adrienne Monnier. Lincoln, NE: University of Nebraska Press. ISBN 978-0-8032-8227-8.
