= Place de l'Odéon =

Square in Paris, France

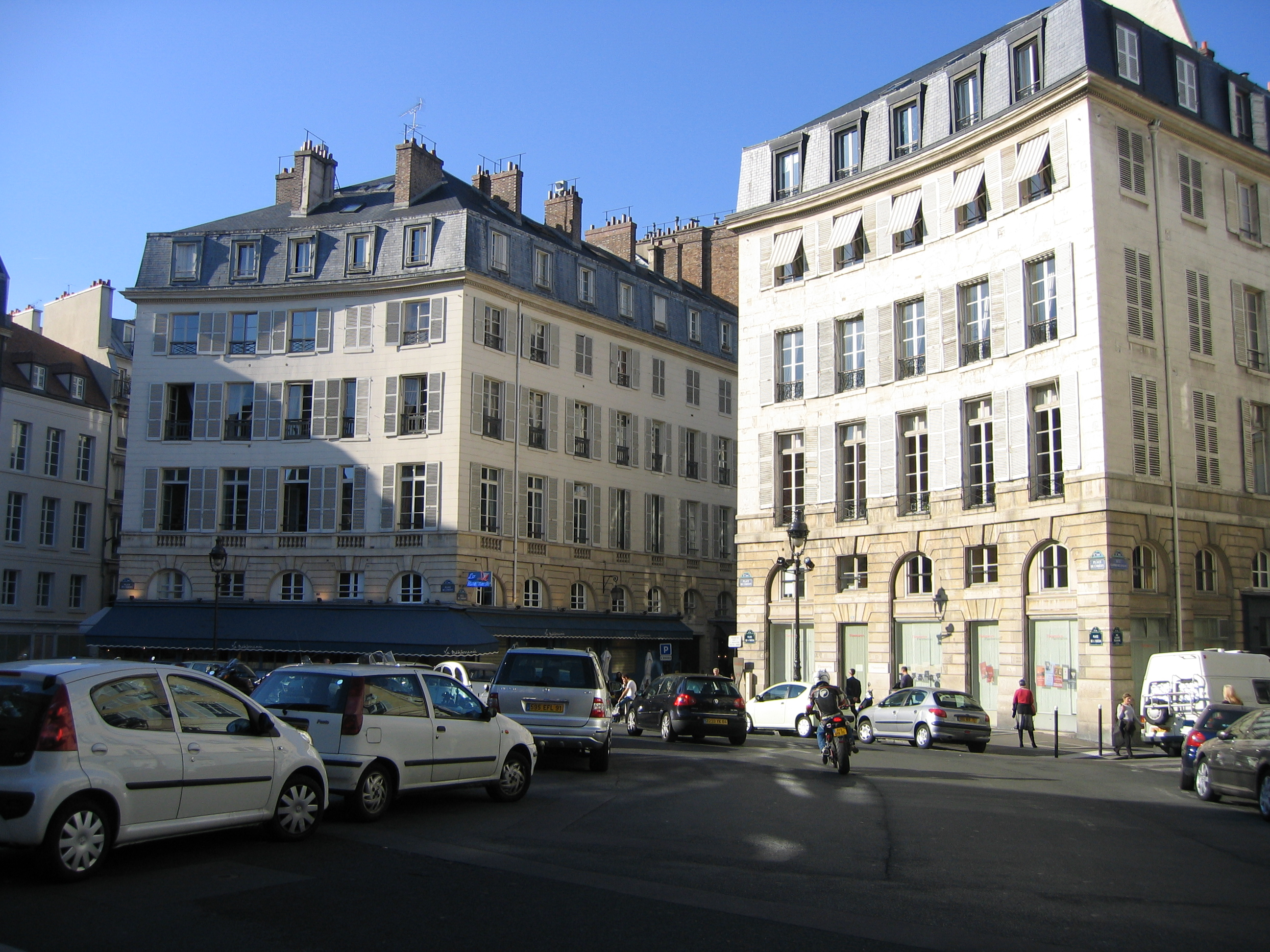
- The Place de l'Odéon

- Location within Paris
- Location: Paris, France
- Arrondissement: 6th
- Quarter: Odéon
- Coordinates: 48°51′00″N 2°20′19″E

The Place de l'Odéon (French pronunciation: [plas d(ə) lɔdeɔ̃]; English: Odeon Square) is a semicircular square in the Odéon quarter in the 6th arrondissement of Paris.

== Description ==
The Place de l'Odéon is in the 6th arrondissement of Paris. It is built as a semi-circle, with its base facing south and running along the Odéon Theatre for which it is named.

From the arc, five streets lead off from the square at regular intervals:

- West: Rue Regnard
- Northwest: Rue Crébillon
- North: Rue de l'Odéon
- Northeast: Rue Casimir-Delavigne
- East: Rue Racine

To the south, on either side of the theatre, two parallel streets run perpendicular to the square: the Rue Rotrou to the west and the Rue Corneille to the east. The Café Voltaire stood at no. 1, frequented by the likes of Barrès, Bourget, Mallarmé, and Verlaine in the 19th century.

== History and notable residents ==
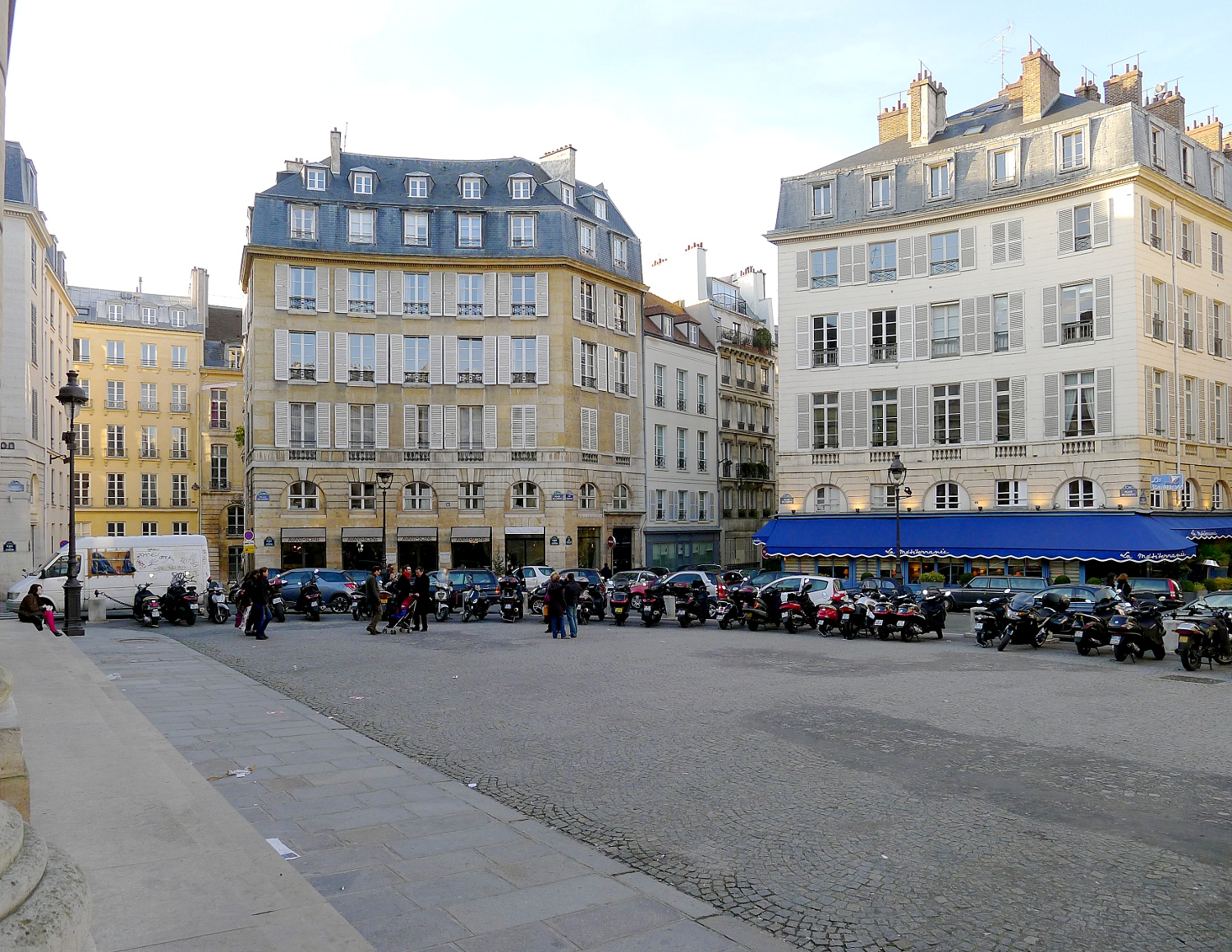
The Place de l'Odéon in 2011

The square was built in 1779, and has concave-fronted buildings. It was opened by letters patent on August 10, 1779, on the site of the Condé Hotel under the name of the Place du Théâtre-Français ("French-Theater Square"). It was later renamed to the Place de la Comédie-Française ("French-Comedy Square"), before taking its current name in 1807.

The Café Voltaire, named after the philosopher and writer Voltaire, was once located in the square. It was frequently visited by Voltaire and his friends.

Camille Desmoulins, his wife Lucile Desmoulins, and Fabre d'Églantine lived at 2, Place de l'Odéon, until they were arrested and subsequently executed at the Place de la Révolution. Camille Desmoulins and Fabre d’Églantine were executed on April 5, 1794 along with, among others, fellow revolutionary Georges Danton. Lucile Desmoulins was executed on April 13, 1794. A plaque was installed to honor their memory. This plaque was once briefly stolen in 1986 for unknown reasons, however it was recovered in an abandoned bus yard and can still be seen today.

During the Three Glorious Days of the July Revolution of 1830, the route was the site of confrontation between insurgents and troops.

== Notable sites ==
- The Place de l'Odéon was classified as a historical monument in 1948.
- The nearby Odeon Theatre
- Location of Madame Vergne's bookshop (1834)
- Headquarters of the Le Dilettante publishing house
