= Rive Gauche =

Part of Paris, France, delimited by the Seine river

The arrondissements of Paris with the river Seine bisecting the city. The Rive Gauche is the southern part.

The Rive Gauche (French pronunciation: [riv ɡoʃ]; Left Bank) is the southern bank of the river Seine in Paris. Here the river flows roughly westward, splitting the city into two parts. When facing downstream, the southern bank is to the left, whereas the northern bank (or Rive Droite) is to the right.

The Rive Gauche is associated with artists, writers, and philosophers, including Colette, Margaret Anderson, Djuna Barnes, Natalie Barney, Sylvia Beach, Erik Satie, Kay Boyle, Bryher, Caresse Crosby, Nancy Cunard, H.D., Janet Flanner, Jane Heap, Maria Jolas, Mina Loy, Henry Miller, Adrienne Monnier, Anaïs Nin, Jean Rhys, Gertrude Stein, Alice B. Toklas, Renee Vivien, Edith Wharton Pablo Picasso, Arthur Rimbaud, Paul Verlaine, Henri Matisse, Jean-Paul Sartre, Ernest Hemingway, F. Scott Fitzgerald, James Baldwin, and dozens of members of the great artistic community at Montparnasse.

The phrase implies a sense of bohemianism, counterculture, and creativity. Some of its famous streets are the Boulevard Saint-Germain, Boulevard Saint-Michel, the Rue de Vaugirard, and Rue Bonaparte.

== History ==
The Latin Quarter is situated on the Rive Gauche, within the 5th and 6th arrondissements in the vicinity of the University of Paris. In the 12th century, the philosopher Peter Abélard helped create the neighborhood when due to his controversial teaching, he was pressured into moving from the prestigious Île de la Cité to a less conspicuous residence. As he and his followers populated the Left Bank, it became famous for the prevalence of scholarly Latin spoken there. The area's origin story formed the basis of the saying, "Paris 'learned to think' on the Left Bank."

== See also ==
- Arrondissements of Paris
- Bank (geography)
- Rive Droite
