= Charles Glass =

American-British author, journalist, broadcaster and publisher (b. 1951)

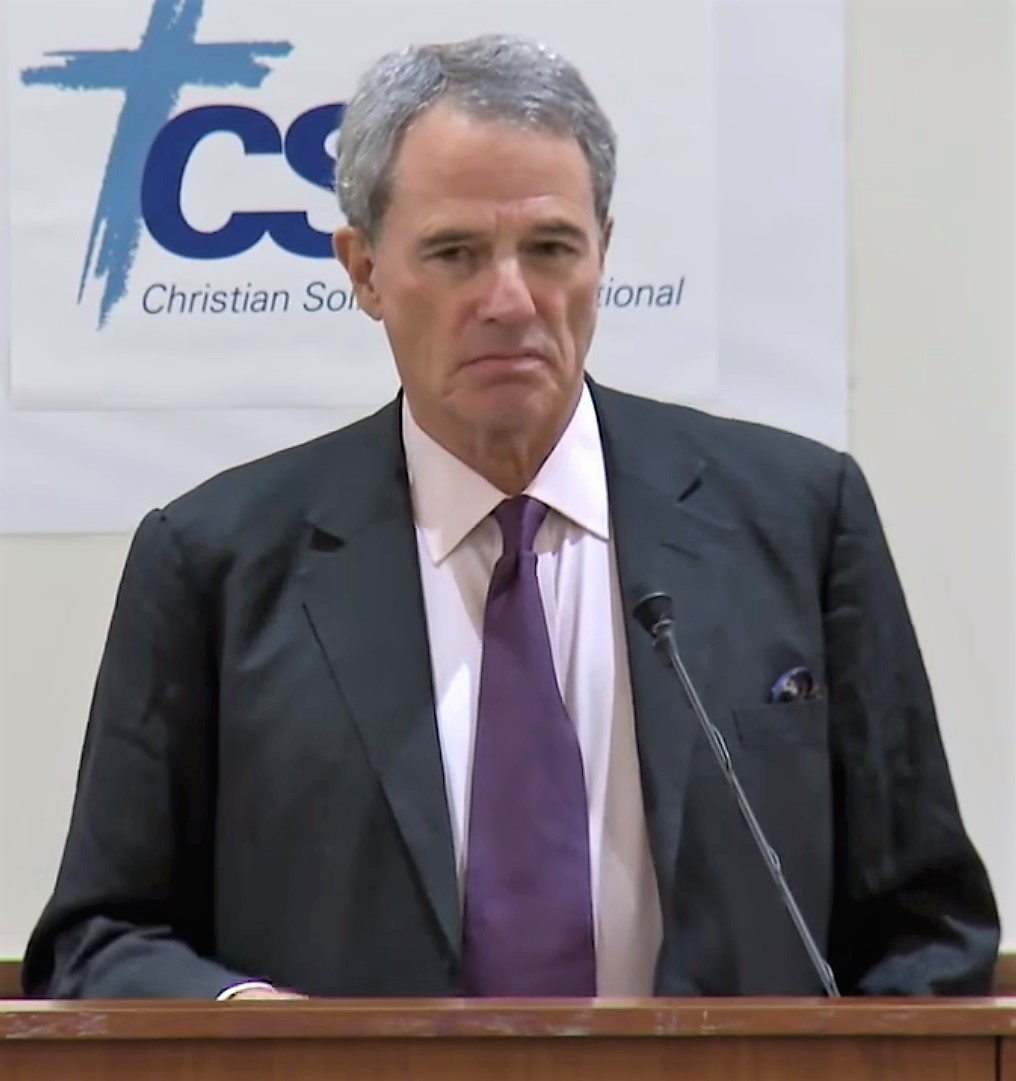
Glass speaking at a Christian Solidarity International event in 2015

Charles Glass (born November 18, 1951) is an American-British author, journalist, broadcaster and publisher specializing in the Middle East, the First World War and the Second World War.

He was ABC News' chief Middle East correspondent from 1983 to 1993, and has worked as a correspondent for Newsweek and The Observer.

Glass is the author of Tribes With Flags: A Dangerous Passage Through the Chaos of the Middle East (1991) and a collection of essays, Money for Old Rope: Disorderly Compositions (1992). A sequel to Tribes with Flags, called The Tribes Triumphant, was published by HarperCollins in June 2006.

His next book, Americans in Paris (HarperCollins and Penguin Press), tells the story of the American citizens who chose to remain in Paris when the Germans occupied the city in 1940. He also wrote Deserter: The Untold Story of World War II (2014) and They Fought Alone: The True Story of the Starr Brothers, British Secret Agents in Nazi-Occupied France (2018).

One of Glass's best known stories was his 1985 interview on the tarmac of Beirut–Rafic Hariri International Airport of the crew of TWA Flight 847 after the flight was hijacked. He broke the news that the hijackers had removed the hostages and had hidden them in the suburbs of Beirut, which caused the Reagan administration to cancel a rescue attempt that would have failed and led to loss of life at the airport. Glass made headlines in 1987, when he was taken hostage for 62 days in Lebanon by Shia militants. He describes the kidnapping and escape in his book Tribes with Flags.

== Personal life ==
Glass was born in Los Angeles, California, on January 23, 1951, and holds dual US/UK citizenship.

He lived in Beirut, Lebanon, for six years. He was married to Fiona Ross for eighteen years. He has three sons, one daughter and two stepdaughters and lives in between Italy, Britain and Lebanon. His maternal grandmother was a Lebanese Maronite Catholic from Ehden, and his father's family emigrated from Ireland to Maryland in the late 1600s.

== Professional life ==
Glass began his career in 1973 with ABC News in Beirut, where he covered the Arab-Israeli war in Syria and Egypt with Peter Jennings. He became the network's chief Middle East correspondent, a position he held for ten years, before deciding to freelance. Since then, he has also worked with CNN and the BBC. In print, he has written for The New York Review of Books, The Independent, The Spectator, The Christian Science Monitor, Time, The Guardian, Chicago Daily News, The Daily Telegraph, The Sunday Telegraph, New Statesman, Times Literary Supplement, London Review of Books, Granta, Harper's Magazine and The London Magazine.

He has made many documentary films for U.S. and British television, including Pity the Nation: Charles Glass' Lebanon; Iraq: Enemies of the State about military escalation and human rights abuses, broadcast six months before Iraq invaded Kuwait; Stains of War about war photographers; The Forgotten Faithful about the Palestinian Christian exodus from the West Bank; Our Man in Cairo; Islam for London Weekend Television and Sadat: An Action Biography for ABC. Glass's film, Edward Said: The Last Interview, was shown at the ICA in London, the British Museum and other cinemas around the world.

He is a lecturer on Middle East and international affairs in Britain and the United States. He was the Books Editor of the Frontline Club Newsletter in London and was a publisher under his imprint, Charles Glass Books, in London. He is a Fellow of the Royal Historical Society in London and of New America in Washington, D.C.

== Works ==
- Tribes With Flags: A Dangerous Passage Through the Chaos of the Middle East, Atlantic Monthly Press, 1991, ISBN 0-87113-457-8
- Money for Old Rope: Disorderly Compositions, Picador, 1992, ISBN 0-330-32209-5
- The Tribes Triumphant, HarperCollins, 2006
- The Northern Front: An Iraq War Diary, Saqi Books, 2006
- Americans in Paris: Life and Death Under the Nazi Occupation, 1940-1944, HarperCollins, 2009, ISBN 978-0-00-722853-9
- The Deserters: A Hidden History of World War II, The Penguin Press, 2013, ISBN 978-1-59420-428-9
- Syria Burning: ISIS and the Death of the Arab Spring, Verso Books, 2015, ISBN 978-1-78478-516-1 (also published under the title Syria Burning: A Short History of a Catastrophe)
- They Fought Alone: The True Story of the Starr Brothers, British Secret Agents in Nazi-Occupied France, Penguin Press, 2018, ISBN 978-1-59420-617-7
- Soldiers Don't Go Mad: A Story of Brotherhood, Poetry, and Mental Illness During the First World War, Penguin Press, 2023, ISBN 978-1-9848-7795-6
- Syria: Civil War to Holy War?, OR Books, 2025, ISBN 978-1-68219-606-9
