= Caresse Crosby =

Socialite and inventor (1892–1970)

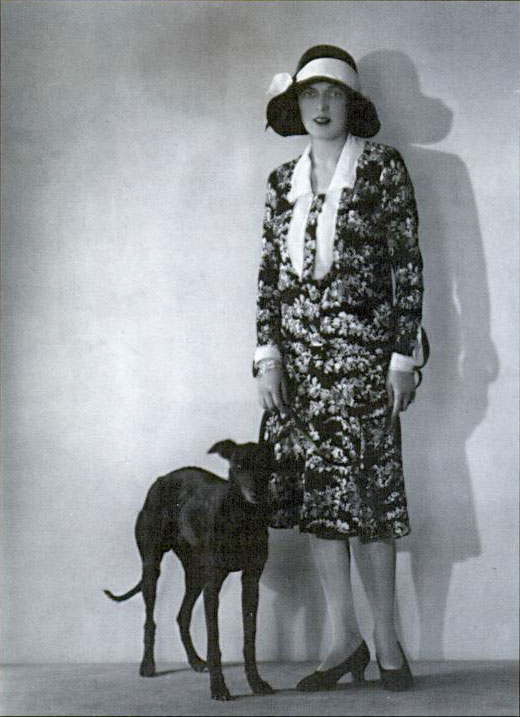
- Caresse Crosby and her whippet Narcisse, 1922
- Born: Mary Phelps Jacob; April 20, 1892; New York City, U.S.
- Died: January 24, 1970 (aged 77); Rome, Italy
- Other names: Polly Jacob, Polly Peabody
- Occupations: Publisher, activist, writer
- Known for: Inventor of the modern bra Co-founder, Black Sun Press
- Notable work: Portfolio: An Intercontinental Quarterly
- Spouses: Richard R. Peabody (m. 1915; div. 1922) Harry Crosby (m. 1922; died 1929) Selbert Young (m. 1937; div. 1939)
- Children: 2

Caresse Crosby (born Mary Phelps Jacob; April 20, 1892 – January 24, 1970) was an American publisher and writer. Time called her the "literary godmother to the Lost Generation of expatriate writers in Paris." As an American patron of the arts, she and her second husband, Harry Crosby, founded the Black Sun Press, which was instrumental in publishing some of the early works of many authors who would later become famous, among them Anaïs Nin, Kay Boyle, Ernest Hemingway, Archibald MacLeish, Henry Miller, Charles Bukowski, Hart Crane, and Robert Duncan. She was also the recipient of a patent for the first successful modern bra.

== Early life and education ==
Born on April 20, 1891, in New Rochelle, New York, she was the oldest child of Mary (née Phelps) Jacob and William Hearn Jacob, who were both descended from American colonial families—her mother from the William Phelps family, and her father from the Van Rensselaers. Her mother was the daughter of Civil War General Walter Phelps, and she had two brothers, Leonard and Walter "Bud" Phelps Jacob. She was nicknamed "Polly" to distinguish her from her mother.

Polly's family was not fabulously rich, but her father had been raised, as she put it, "to ride to hounds, sail boats, and lead cotillions," and he lived extravagantly. In 1914, the family presented her to the King of England at a garden party. In keeping with the American aristocratic style of the times, she was even photographed as a child by Charles Dana Gibson, for whom the iconic term "Gibson girl" was coined.

She grew up, she later said, "in a world where only good smells existed. What I wanted usually came to pass." She was an uninterested student. Author Geoffrey Wolff wrote that for the most part Polly "lived her life in dreams."

Her family divided its time between estates in Manhattan at 59th Street and Fifth Avenue, in Watertown, Connecticut, and in New Rochelle, New York, and she enjoyed the advantages of an upper-class lifestyle. She attended formal balls, Ivy League school dances, and received equestrian training at a horse riding school. She studied dance at the studio of composer and society tastemaker Allen Dodsworth, attended Miss Chapin's School in New York City, and then boarded at Rosemary Hall, a prep school in Wallingford, Connecticut that later merged to form Choate Rosemary Hall, where she played the part of Rosalind in As You Like It to critical acclaim.

After her father's death in 1908, she lived with her mother at their home in Watertown, Connecticut. That same year she met her future husband, Richard Peabody, at summer camp. Her brother Len was boarding at Westminster School, and Bud was a day student at Taft School. Approaching her own debut, she danced in balls most nights, and slept from four in the morning until noon. "At twelve I was called and got ready for the customary debutante luncheon." She graduated from Rosemary Hall in 1910, at age 19.

== Development of the backless brassiere ==
That same year, Crosby prepared to attend a débutante ball one evening. As was customary, she put on a corset stiffened with whalebone and a restrictive, tight cover that flattened and jammed her breasts together. The point of a corset was to cinch the waist in as tightly as possible, holding a woman's torso erect. It would have been difficult to feel comfortable dressed in such a confining garment. Mary had worn that same dress at her debut to society a few weeks earlier. It was a sheer evening gown with a plunging neckline to display the cleavage. However, in this case the corset cover, a "boxlike armour of whalebone and pink cordage," poked out from under the gown, so she called her personal maid. She told her, "Bring me two of my pocket handkerchiefs and some pink ribbon ... And bring the needle and thread and some pins." She fashioned the handkerchiefs and ribbon into a simple bra.

Mary's devised undergarment complemented the new fashions of the time. She was mobbed after the dance by other girls who wanted to know how she moved so freely, and when she showed the garment to friends the next day, they all wanted one. One day, she received a request for one of her contraptions from a stranger, who offered a dollar for her efforts. She knew then that this could become a viable business.

=== Patent granted ===
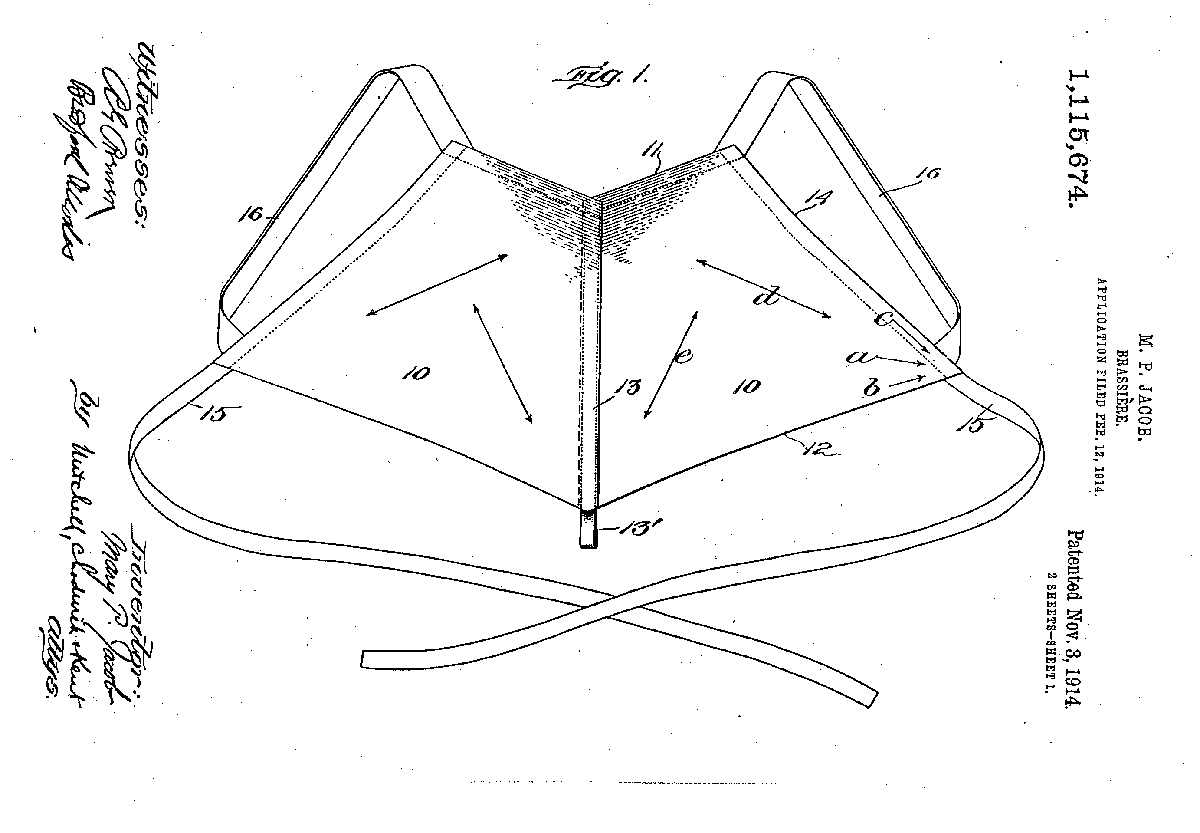
Jacob's brassiere, from the original patent application.

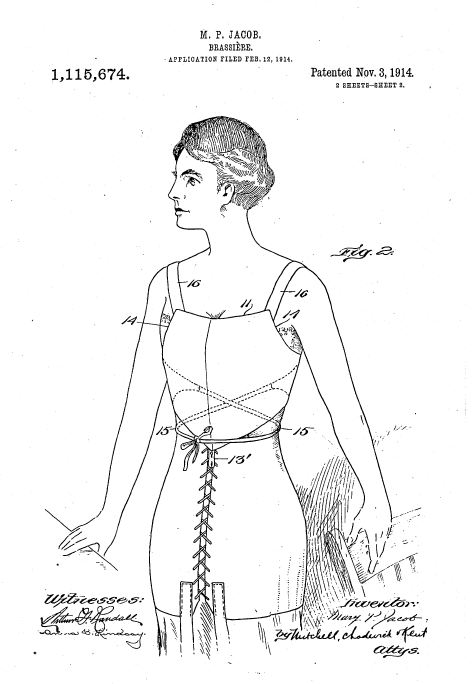
Jacob's brassiere, from the original patent application.

Crosby filed for a patent for her invention on February 12, 1914, and in November that year the United States Patent and Trademark Office granted her a patent for the 'Backless Brassiere'. Crosby likened her design to earlier covers over the bosom when a woman wore a low corset. Her design had shoulder straps to attach to the garment's upper and lower corners, and wrap-around laces for the lower corners which tied at the woman's front, enabling her to wear gowns cut low in the back. Crosby wrote that her invention was "well-adapted to women of different size" and was "so efficient that it may be worn by persons engaged in violent exercise like tennis." Her design was lightweight, soft, and comfortable to wear. It naturally separated the breasts, unlike the corset, which was heavy, stiff, and uncomfortable, and had the effect of creating a single "monobosom" effect.

While Crosby's design was the first granted a patent within its category, The U.S. Patent Office and foreign patent offices had issued patents for various bra-like undergarments as early as the 1860s. Other brassiere designs had previously been invented and popularized for use within the United States since about 1910. By 1912, American mass-market brassiere manufacturers included Bien Jolie Brassieres and DeBevoise Brassieres. The latter first advertised its bust supporter in Vogue in 1904.

Leading European couturier Lucile actively endorsed bras, and both Lucile and Paul Poiret refined and promoted the brassiere, influencing fashionable women to wear their designs, Paris couturier Herminie Cadolle introduced a breast supporter in 1889. Her design was a sensation at the Great Exposition of 1900 and became a fast-selling design among wealthy Europeans in the next decade.

=== Business career ===
After she married Richard Peabody, Crosby filed a legal certificate with the Commonwealth of Massachusetts on May 19, 1920, declaring that she was a married woman conducting a business using funds that were from her husband's bank account. In 1922 she founded the Fashion Form Brassière Company, locating her manufacturing shop on Washington Street in Boston, where she opened a two-woman sweatshop to manufacture her wireless brassières. The location also became a convenient place for romantic trysts with Harry Crosby, who would become her second husband.

In her later autobiography, The Passionate Years, she maintained that she had "a few hundred (units) of her design produced." She managed to secure a few orders from department stores, but her business never took off. Harry, who had a distaste for conventional business and a generous trust fund, discouraged her from pursuing the business and persuaded her to close it. She later sold the brassiere patent to the Warner Brothers Corset Company in Bridgeport, Connecticut, for US$1,500 (roughly equivalent to $29,000 in current dollars). Warner manufactured the "Crosby" bra for a while, but it was not a popular style and was eventually discontinued. However, Warner would go on to earn more than US$15 million from the bra patent over the next thirty years.

In her later years, Crosby wrote, "I can't say the brassiere will ever take as great a place in history as the steamboat, but I did invent it."

== Marriages and family life ==
In 1915, Polly Jacob and Richard ("Dick") Peabody were married by his grandfather, Endicott Peabody, the founder of the Groton School, and whose family had been one of the wealthiest in America during the 19th century. By the early 20th century, a case could be made that the Peabodies had supplanted the Cabots and the Lodges as the most distinguished name in the region.

Crosby found Peabody's temperament to be far from her own. When they had a son, William Jacob, on February 4, 1916, she noted that "Dick was not the most indulgent of parents and like his father before him, he forbade the gurgles and cries of infancy; when they occurred he walked out, and often walked back unsteadily."

Crosby concluded that Peabody was a well-educated but undirected man, and a reluctant father. Less than a year later, he enlisted at the Mexican border and joined the Boston militia engaged in stopping Pancho Villa's cross-border raids. Less than a year after he returned home from that adventure, he enlisted to fight in World War I. Their second child, a daughter, Polleen Wheatland ("Polly"), was born on August 12, 1917, but Peabody was already in Officers Training Camp at Plattsburgh, New York, where he was commissioned a Second Lieutenant in the Artillery. He became a Captain in the United States Army's 15th Field Artillery, 2nd Division, American Expeditionary Force. Baby Polly was largely cared for by Peabody's parents, but Crosby recalled that "My father-in-law was a stickler for polish, both of manners and minerals." Crosby's mother-in-law wore "nun-like dresses and in bed or out wore starched cuffs as sever as piping." Peabody, meanwhile, was enjoying life at the front as a bachelor.

Peabody returned home in early 1921 and was assigned to Columbia, South Carolina. Crosby and the children soon joined him, but when the war ended, Peabody found himself left with nothing but a family allowance. He suffered from his war experiences and returned to heavy drinking. Crosby found he had only three real interests, all acquired at Harvard: to play, to drink, and to turn out, at any hour, to chase after fire engines and watch buildings burn. Crosby's life was difficult during the war years, and when her husband returned home, significantly changed, her life soon changed abruptly, too.

=== Relationship with Harry Crosby ===
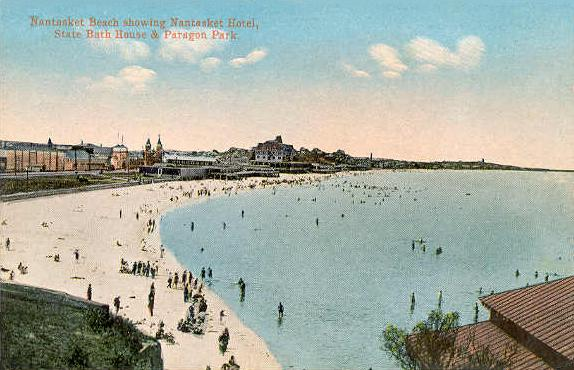
Nantasket Beach and the Nantasket Hotel, State Bath House and Paragon Park in the background, circa 1910.

The catalyst for Polly Jacob Peabody's transformation was her introduction and eventual marriage to Harry Crosby, a wealthy scion of a socially prominent Boston family, and another veteran and victim of the recent war. Harry attended private schools and until age 19 appeared to be well on the path to a comfortable life as a member of the upper middle class. His experiences in World War I changed everything.

In the pattern of other sons of the elite from New England, he was a volunteer in the American Field Service Ambulance Corps, along with Archibald MacLeish and Ernest Hemingway. On November 22, 1917, the ambulance he was driving was destroyed by artillery fire, but he emerged miraculously unhurt. His best friend, "Spud" Spaulding, was seriously wounded in the explosion, and Harry saved his life. The experience profoundly shaped Harry's future. He was at the Second Battle of Verdun. After the battle, his section (the 29th Infantry Division, attached to the 120th French Division) was cited for bravery, and in 1919 Crosby was one of the youngest Americans awarded the Croix de Guerre. Crosby wrote in his journal, "Most people die of a sort of creeping common sense and discover when it's too late that the only things one never regrets are one's mistakes." He vowed that he would live life on his own terms.

After returning from World War I and while completing his degree at Harvard, Harry met Polly on July 4, 1920, at an Independence Day picnic. Polly's husband Richard was in a sanitarium drying out from another drunken spell. Sensing Polly's isolation, Harry's mother Henrietta Crosby had invited Polly to chaperone Harry and some of his friends to a party, including dinner and a trip to the amusement park at Nantasket Beach. Polly was 28, married, with two small children. Harry was 22, of slight build, with an unusual blonde hair style, a pale complexion, a weak constitution, a consuming gaze and enormous charisma. During dinner, Harry never spoke to the girl on his left, breaking decorum. By some accounts, Harry fell in love with the buxom Mrs. Peabody in about two hours. He confessed his love for her in the Tunnel of Love at the amusement park. Crosby pressed her to see him alone, an unthinkable proposition for a member of Boston's upper class. She later wrote, "Harry was utterly ruthless ... to know Harry was a devastating experience." On July 20, they spent the night together and had sex, and two days later Polly accompanied Harry to New York. He had planned a trip to France to tour battle sites. They spent the night together in New York at the Belmont Hotel. Polly said of the night, "For the first time in my life, I knew myself to be a person."

Polly was seen by her social circle as someone who had betrayed the trust placed in her as a chaperone, and as an older woman who had taken advantage of a younger man. To the Crosbys, she was dishonorable and corrupt. Polly and Harry's scandalous courtship was the gossip of blue-blood Boston.

In the fall, Polly's husband Dick Peabody moved back home. His parents supplied a small living allowance and Dick, Polly, and the two children moved into a three-story tenement building. Meanwhile, Crosby lived with his father while Dick continued his studies at Harvard. While Dick worked at the bank, Harry Crosby sent crates of flowers from his mother's garden to Polly's apartment and brought over toys for the children. They drove to the beach together. Dick volunteered to join the fire department, and persuaded the fire chief to wire a fire alarm bell to his home, so he could turn out at any hour. The fire chief soon let Dick go, and Dick retreated into drink again.

Crosby pursued Polly, and in May 1921, when she would not respond to his ardor, Crosby threatened suicide if Polly did not marry him. Polly's husband was in and out of sanitariums several times, fighting alcoholism. Crosby pestered Polly to tell her husband of their affair and to divorce him. In May, she revealed her adultery to Dick and suggested a separation, and he offered no resistance. Polly's mother insisted that she stop seeing Crosby for six months to avoid complete rejection by her society peers, a condition she agreed to, and she left Boston for New York. Divorce was "unheard of ... even among Boston Episcopalians." Peabody's parents were outraged at her affair with Crosby, and that she would ask for a divorce. Dick's father Jacob Peabody even visited Harry's father, Stephen Crosby, on January 4, 1922, to discuss the situation, but Harry's father would not meet with him, for despite his disapproval of Harry's irregular behavior, he loved his son. Stephen Crosby at first attempted to dissuade Harry from marrying Polly, and even bought him the Stutz motor car he had been asking for, but Harry would not be persuaded to change his mind. For her part, Polly's former friends pilloried her as an adulteress, leaving Polly stunned by the quick turn-about in their attitudes toward her. Polly later described Harry's character as: "He seemed to be more expression and mood, than man," she wrote, "yet he was the most vivid personality I've ever known, electric with rebellion.

=== Divorce from Richard Peabody ===
In June 1921, she formally separated from Dick, and in December he offered to divorce her. In February 1922, Polly and Richard Peabody were legally divorced. Dick subsequently recovered from his alcoholism and published The Common Sense of Drinking (1933). He was the first to assert there was no cure for alcoholism. His book became a best seller and was a major influence on Alcoholics Anonymous founder Bill Wilson. Crosby had been working for eight months at Shawmut National Bank. He went on a six-day drinking spree and resigned. In May 1922, he moved to Paris to work in a job arranged for him by his family at Morgan, Harjes et Cie, the Morgan family's bank in Paris. This was fitting, for Crosby, after all, was the nephew of Jessie Morgan, the wife of American capitalist J. P. Morgan, Jr., but it was also awkward because he was both Richard Peabody's and Harry Crosby's godfather.

Polly had previously traveled to England to visit her cousins, so Crosby visited her there. From May through July, 1922 they lived together in Paris. In July, Polly returned to the U.S. In September, Harry proposed to Polly via transatlantic cable, and the next day he bribed his way aboard the RMS Aquitania bound for New York.

=== Move to Paris ===
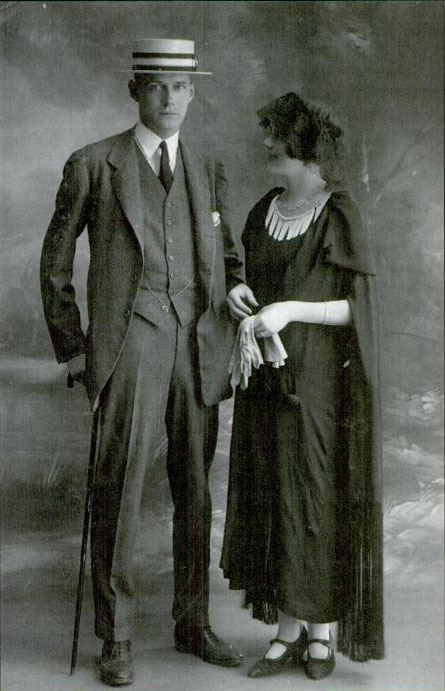
Harry and Polly Crosby on the day of their marriage on September 9, 1922.

On September 9, 1922, Harry reached New York aboard the Aquitania. Polly met him at the customs barrier, and they were married in the Municipal Building in New York City that afternoon. Two days later, they re-boarded the Aquitania and moved with her children to Paris, France. Harry continued his work in Paris at Morgan, Harjes & Co.

Polly's bubble in Paris burst when she learned shortly after their arrival that Harry had been flirting with a girl from Boston. It was the first of many flirtations and affairs that Polly would learn to live with. In early 1923, Polly introduced Harry to her friend Constance Crowninshield Coolidge. She was the niece of Frank Crowninshield, editor of Vanity Fair, and had been married to American diplomat Ray Atherton. Constance did not care what others thought about her. She loved anything risky and was addicted to gambling. She and Harry soon began a sexual relationship.

In the fall of 1923, Polly could not put up with their affair any longer and left for London. Harry told Constance that he could not meet Polly's demand that he "love her more than anyone in the world. This is absolutely impossible." But Harry also would not leave Polly, nor did Constance ask him to. But when Constance received a letter from Polly, who confessed that Constance's affair with her husband had made her "very miserable," Constance wrote Harry and told him she would not see him any more. Harry was devastated by her decision. "Your letter was bar none the worst blow I have ever received. ... I wouldn't leave her under any circumstances nor as you say would you ever marry me." But the three remained friends, and on October 1, 1924, Constance married the Count Pierre de Jumilhac, although the marriage only lasted five years. Polly appeared at least outwardly to tolerate Harry's dallying unconventional behavior, and she soon had her own courtiers. In her journals, she privately worried about whether Harry would remain loyal to her.

Their glamorous and luxurious lifestyle soon included an open marriage, numerous affairs, and plenty of drugs and drinking. At the end of 1924, Harry persuaded Polly to formally change her first name. They briefly considered Clytoris before deciding on Caresse. Harry suggesting that her new name "begin with a C to go with Crosby and it must form a cross with mine." The two names intersected at right angles at the common "R," "the Crosby cross." They later named their second whippet Clytoris, explaining to Caresse's young daughter Polleen she was named after a Greek goddess.

In July 1925, Harry had sexual relations with a 14-year-old girl he nicknamed "Nubile," with a "baby face and large breasts," whom he saw at Étretat, a town in Normandy. In Morocco, during one of their trips to North Africa, Harry and Caresse together took a 13-year-old dancing girl named Zora to bed with them. Harry also had sex with a boy of unspecified age, his only recorded homosexual dalliance.

In 1927, in the midst of his affair with Constance, Harry and Caresse met the Russian painter Polia Chentoff. Harry asked her to paint Caresse's portrait, and he soon fell in love with Polia. In November, Harry wrote to his mother that Polia was "very beautiful and terribly serious about art... she ran away from home when she was thirteen to paint." He was also said to be in love with his cousin Nina de Polignac.

In June 1928, Harry met Josephine Rotch at the Lido in Venice, while she was shopping for her wedding trousseau, and they began an affair. In her autobiography, Caresse minimized Harry's dalliance with Josephine, eliminating a number of references to her. Harry told Caresse that Constance and Josephine wanted to marry him.

=== Expatriate life ===
From their arrival in 1922, the Crosbys led the life of rich expatriates. They were attracted to the bohemian lifestyles of the artists gathering in Montparnasse. They settled into an apartment at 12, Quai d'Orléans on Île St-Louis, and Caresse donned her red bathing suit and rowed Harry down the river to the Place de la Concorde, where he walked the last few blocks to the bank. Harry wore his dark business suit, formal hat, and carried his umbrella and briefcase. Caresse rowed home alone, and in her swim suit her generously endowed chest drew whistles, jeers, and waves from workmen. She later wrote that she thought the exercise was good for her breasts, and she enjoyed the attention.

Harry enjoyed betting on the horse races. They first smoked opium together in Africa, and when their friend Constance Crowninshield Coolidge knocked on their door late one evening, they jumped at her invitation to join her at Drosso's apartment. Invitations to Drosso's were restricted to a few regulars and occasional friends, as it was an opium den. At Drosso's she found small rooms filled with low couches and decorations evoking a middle-Eastern setting. Caresse made a sensation when she arrived, because she had been ready for bed when Constance knocked, so she quickly put on a dress, but wore nothing underneath. After that introduction, Harry dropped in at Drosso's frequently, and it sometimes kept him away from home for days at a time.

After about a year, Harry soon tired of the predictable banker's life and quit, fully joining the Lost Generation of expatriate Americans disillusioned by the restrictive atmosphere of 1920s America. They were among about 15,000–40,000 Americans living in Paris. Harry wanted as little to do with Caresse's children as possible, so after the first year they shipped her son Billy off to Cheam School in Hampshire, England.

The couple cared little for the future, spent their money recklessly, and never tried to live on a budget. This was in part because they had made a suicide pact, which they planned to carry out on October 31, 1942. On that date the earth would be closer to the sun than it had been in several decades, and they promised to jump out of an airplane together. This was to be followed by cremation, after which heirs would disperse their ashes from another airplane.

Spending freely, Harry bought a silk-buttonhole gardenia tuxedo from an exclusive tailor on rue de la Paix. Caresse bought hats from Jean Patou and dresses from the fashion house Tolstoy's. On special occasions she wore an evening suit made of gold fabric, featuring a short skirt tailored by Vionnet, one of the most important Parisian fashion icons. Although perfectly chic by Parisian standards, it was nevertheless unacceptable to her cousins and aunts who lived in the aristocratic neighborhood of Faubourg in Paris.

Caresse and Harry purchased their first race horse in June 1924, and then two more in April 1925. They rented a fashionable apartment at 19, Rue de Lille, and obtained a 20-year lease on a mill outside of Paris on the grounds of the Château d' Ermenonville, which belonged to their friend Armand de la Rochefoucauld, for 2,200 dollar gold pieces (about $41,330 today). They named it "Le Moulin du Soleil" ("The Mill of the Sun"), and she used a wall as a "guest book" for guests to paint pictures and sign their names.

In the first year there, they made friends with a group of students who attended the Académie des Beaux-Arts, located at the end of their street. The students invited Harry and Caresse to their annual Quartre Arts Ball, an invitation the couple embraced with enthusiasm. Harry fashioned a necklace out of four dead pigeons, sported a red loincloth, and brought along a bag of snakes. Caresse wore a sheer garment that only came up to her waist, a huge turquoise wig, and nothing else. They both dyed their skin with red ochre. The students cheered Caresse's toplessness, and 10 of them carried her around on their shoulders.

In January 1925 they traveled to North Africa, where they again smoked opium, a habit to which they would return again and again. In 1928, they traveled to Lebanon to visit the Temple of Baalbek.

In 1928, Harry inherited his cousin Walter Berry's considerable collection of over 8,000 mostly rare books, a collection he prized but which he also scaled back by giving away hundreds of volumes. He was known to slip rare first editions into the bookstalls that lined the Seine. Caresse took on lovers of her own, including Ortiz Manolo, Lord Lymington, Jacques Porel, Cord Meier, and in May, 1928, the Count Armand de La Rochefoucauld, son of the duke de Doudeauville, president of the Jockey Club. But behind closed doors, Harry applied a double standard, quarreling violently with Caresse about her affairs. Occasionally they were swingers together, as when they met two other couples and drove to the country near Bois de Boulogne, drew the cars into a circle with their headlights on, and changed partners.

=== Affair with Cartier-Bresson ===
In 1929, Harry met Henri Cartier-Bresson at Le Bourget, where Cartier-Bresson's air squadron commandant had placed him under house arrest for hunting without a license. Harry persuaded the officer to release Cartier-Bresson into his custody for a few days. The men found they shared an interest in photography, and they spent their time together taking and printing pictures at Harry and Caresse's home, Le Moulin du Soleil. Harry later said Cartier-Bresson "looked like a fledgling, shy and frail, and mild as whey." A friend of Crosby's from Texas encouraged Cartier-Bresson to take photography more seriously. Embracing the open sexuality offered by Caresse and Harry, Cartier-Bresson fell into an intense sexual relationship with her. In 1931, two years after Harry's suicide, the end of his affair with Caresse Crosby left Cartier-Bresson broken-hearted, and he escaped to Ivory Coast of French colonial Africa.

== Publication of poetry ==
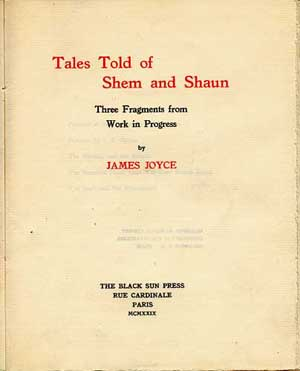
Cover of Tales of Shem and Shaun by James Joyce published by Caresse Crosby and the Black Sun Press

Caresse and Harry published her first book, Crosses of Gold, in late 1924. It was a volume of conventional, "unadventurous" poetry centering on themes such as love, beauty, and her husband.

In 1926 they published her second book, Graven Images, with Houghton Mifflin in Boston. This was the only time they used another publisher. Harry later wrote that his cousin, Walter Berry, suggested that Houghton Mifflin would publish Caresse's poetry because "they have just lost Amy Lowell." Her work remained relatively conventional, "still rhyming love with dove," by her own admission. A Boston Transcript reviewer said her "poetry sings," and a Literary Review contributor admired her "charming" child poems and French flavor. But a critic in the New York Herald Tribune wrote that "[f]or all its enthusiasm there is no impact to thought or phrase, the emotion is meager, the imagination bridled."

In April 1927 they founded an English-language publishing company that they first named Éditions Narcisse, after their black whippet, Narcisse Noir. They used the press as an avenue to publish their own poetry in small editions of finely-made, hard-bound volumes. Their first effort was Caresse's Painted Shores, in which she wrote about their relationship, including their reconciliation after one of Harry's affairs. Her writing matured somewhat, and the book was more creatively organized than her prior efforts. In 1928 she wrote an epic poem which was published as The Stranger. The writing is addressed to the men in her life: her father, husband, and son. In an experimental fashion she explored the various kinds of love she had known. Later that year, Impossible Melodies explored similar themes. The Crosbys enjoyed such a positive reception of their initial work and decided to expand the press to serve other authors.

Publishing in Paris during the 1920s and 1930s put the company in the milieu of so many American writers who were living abroad. In 1928, Éditions Narcisse published a limited edition of 300 numbered copies of "The Fall of the House of Usher" by Edgar Allan Poe with illustrations by Alastair.

In 1928, Harry and Caresse changed the name of the publishing house to the Black Sun Press, in keeping with Harry's fascination with death and the symbolism of the sun. Harry developed a private mythology around the sun as a symbol for both life and death, creation, and destruction. The press rapidly gained notice for publishing beautifully bound, typographically flawless editions of unusual books. They took exquisite care with the books they published, choosing the finest papers and inks.

They published early works of a number of avant-garde writers before those writers were well-known, including James Joyce's Tales Told of Shem and Shaun, which was later integrated into Finnegans Wake. They published Kay Boyle's first book-length work, Short Stories, in 1929, and works by Hart Crane, Ernest Hemingway, Eugene Jolas, D. H. Lawrence, Archibald MacLeish, Ezra Pound, and Laurence Sterne. The Black Sun Press evolved into one of the most important small presses in Paris in the 1920s. In 1929, Caresse and Harry both signed poet Eugene Jolas' The Revolution of the Word Proclamation, which appeared in issue 16/17 of the literary journal transition. After Harry died, Caresse continued publishing until 1936, when she left Europe for the United States.

== Harry's suicide ==
On July 9, 1928, Harry met 20-year-old Josephine Noyes Rotch, whom he would call the "Youngest Princess of the Sun" and the "Fire Princess." She was descended from a family that first settled in Provincetown, Cape Cod in 1690. Josephine inspired Harry's next collection of poems called Transit of Venus. Though she was ten years his junior, Harry fell in love with Josephine. In a letter to his mother, dated July 24, 1928, Harry wrote:

I am having an affair with a girl I met (not introduced) at the Lido. She is twenty and has charm and is called Josephine. I like girls when they are very young before they have any minds.

Josephine and Harry had an ongoing affair until she married, when their relationship temporarily ended. However, Josephine rekindled the affair, and in late November 1929, Harry and Josephine met and traveled to Detroit, where they checked into an expensive Book-Cadillac Hotel as Mr. and Mrs. Harry Crane. For four days they took meals in their room, smoked opium, and had sex.

On November 29, 1929, the lovers returned to New York, where once again they attempted to end the affair, and Josephine agreed that she would return to Boston and her husband. But two days later, she had delivered a 36-line poem to Harry, who was staying with Caresse at the Savoy-Plaza Hotel. The last line of the poem read "Death is our marriage." On December 9, Harry Crosby wrote in his journal for the last time: "One is not in love unless one desires to die with one's beloved. There is only one happiness it is to love and to be loved."

Harry was found at 10 that night in bed at Stanley Mortimer's studio in the Hotel des Artistes. He had a .25 caliber bullet hole in his right temple. He lay next to Josephine, who had a matching hole in her left temple. They were in an affectionate embrace. Both were dressed, but had bare feet. Harry sported red-painted toenails and tattoos on the bottom of his feet. The coroner said that Josephine died at least two hours before Harry did. There was no suicide note, and newspapers ran sensational articles for days, calling it a murder-suicide or double suicide pact, and unable to decide which was more fitting.

== Later life ==
Illustration by Alastair from Harry Crosby's book Red Skeletons, published in 1927.

Harry left Caresse US$100,000 (about $1,875,000 today) in his will, along with generous bequests to Josephine, Constance, and others. His parents Stephen and Henrietta had the will declared invalid, but reassured Caresse that she would receive US$2000 (approximately $29,000 today) a year until she received money from Walter Berry's estate. Upon Caresse Crosby's return to Europe, she asked her friend Bill Sykes to bring Polleen from Chamonix. She also welcomed Billy home when another friend brought him from boarding school, and the family and friends spent some time at the Mill. Polleen stayed with her mother for a few months, refusing to return to school. Billy returned to Choam, and in 1931 returned to the U.S. to attend the Lenox School.

Crosby decided to reclaim her birth name, Mary, and thus was known after her husband's death as "Mary Caresse Crosby." She pursued ambitions as an actress that she had had since her 20s, and appeared as a dancer in two short experimental films directed by artist Emlen Etting, Poem 8 (1932) and Oramunde (1933).

Crosby broadened the scope of the Black Sun Press after Harry's death. Although the press published few works after 1952, it printed James Joyce's Collected Poems in 1963. Despite the slowdown, it did not officially close until Crosby's death in 1970.

=== Continuation of Black Sun Press ===
After Harry's suicide, Caresse dedicated herself to the Black Sun Press. She also established, with Jacques Porel, a side venture to publish paperback books when they were not yet popular, which she named Crosby Continental Editions. Ernest Hemingway, a long-time friend, offered her a choice of The Torrents of Spring (1926) or The Sun Also Rises (1926) as a debut volume for her new venture. Caresse picked the former, which was less well-received than The Sun Also Rises. She followed Hemingway's work with nine more books in 1932, including William Faulkner's Sanctuary, Kay Boyle's Year Before Last, Dorothy Parker's Laments for the Living, and Antoine de Saint-Exupéry's Night Flight, along with works by Paul Eluard, Max Ernst, Alain-Fournier, George Grosz, C. G. Jung, and Charles-Louis Philippe. After six months of sales, the books only grossed about US$1200. Crosby was unable to persuade U.S. publishers to distribute her work, as paperbacks were not yet widely engaged, because publishers were not convinced that readers would buy them. She closed the press in 1933.

=== Interracial affair with Canada Lee ===
In 1934, she began a love affair with the black actor-boxer Canada Lee, despite living under the threat of miscegenation laws. They had lunch uptown in Harlem at the then-new restaurant Franks, where they could maintain their secret relationship. By the 1940s, Lee was a Broadway star and featured in the nationwide run of the play Native Son. But the only establishment in Washington, D.C. where they could eat together was an African restaurant named the Bugazi. Lee, unlike so many of her lovers, did not ask for money, even when his nightclub The Chicken Coop had a difficult time. When, during a dinner in the early 1940s, Crosby's brother Walter expressed his dismay at their relationship, Crosby was so offended that she made little contact with Walter over the next 10 years. Crosby and Lee's intimate relationship continued into the mid-1940s and contributed to her worldview. Crosby wrote a never-published play, The Cage, transparently based on their relationship.

=== Marriage to Bert Saffold Young ===
While taking her daughter Polly to Hollywood, where the latter aspired to become an actor, Crosby met Selbert "Bert" Saffold Young (1910-1971), an unemployed aspiring actor and former football player 18 years her junior. When he saw her staring at him in a restaurant, he immediately came over and asked her to dance. She described him as "handsome as Hermes" and "as militant as Mars." Her friend Constance described Bert as "untamed" and "entirely ruled by impulse."

Without a job, he convinced Crosby he just wanted to own a farm, and they decided to look for land on the East Coast. They drove through Virginia, looking for an old plantation house smothered in roses. When their car broke down, she accidentally discovered Hampton Manor, a Hereford cattle farm with a dilapidated brick mansion on a 486 acres (197 ha) estate in Bowling Green, Virginia. It had been built in 1838 by John Hampton DeJarnette from plans by his friend, Thomas Jefferson. John Hampton was the brother of Virginia Legislator Daniel Coleman DeJarnette, Sr.

On September 30, 1936, she wrote to the New York Trust Company and instructed them to send 433 shares of stock that she used to buy the property, which was in need of renovation. Crosby and Young were married in Virginia on March 24, 1937. There were problems, however. He was always asking her for money, he crashed her car, he ran up the telephone bill, and he used all her credit at the local liquor store. Bert ended one bout of drinking with a solo trip to Florida, and he did not come back to Virginia until the next year.

=== A ghostwriter of erotica ===
In Paris during 1933, Crosby had met Henry Miller. When he returned to the U.S. in 1940, Miller confessed to Crosby his lack of success in getting his work published. Miller's autobiographical book Tropic of Cancer was banned in the U.S. as pornographic, and he could get no other work published. She invited him to take a room in her spacious New York apartment on East 54th Street, where she infrequently lived. He accepted, although she did not provide him with money.

Desperate for cash, Miller fell to churning out erotica on commission for an Oklahoma oil baron at a dollar per page, but after two 100-page stories that brought him US$200, he felt he could do no more. Now he wanted to tour the United States by car and write about it. He got a US$750 advance and persuaded the oil man's agent to advance him another $200. He was preparing to leave on the trip but still had not provided the work promised. He thought then of Crosby. She was already pitching ideas and pieces of writing to Anaïs Nin's New York City smut club for fun, but not for money. In her journal, Nin wrote, "Harvey Breit, Robert Duncan, George Barker, Caresse Crosby, all of us concentrating our skills in a tour de force, supplying the old man with such an abundance of perverse felicities, that now he begged for more." Crosby was facile and clever, writing easily and quickly with little effort.

Crosby accepted Miller's proposal. She wrote at the top the title given her by Henry Miller, Opus Pistorum (later republished as Miller's work as Under the Roofs of Paris), and started right in. Miller left for his car tour of America. Crosby churned out 200 pages, and the collector's agent asked for more. Crosby's smut was just what the oil man wanted, according to his New York agent. No literary aspirations, just plain sex. In her journal, Nin wrote, "'Less poetry,' said the voice over the telephone. 'Be specific.'" In Crosby the agent had found himself a more basic and pornographic version of Henry Miller.

While Crosby's husband fell into a drunken stupor every night, she spent some of her time churning out another 200 pages of pornography. In her diary, Nin observed that everyone who wrote pornography with her wrote out of a self that was opposite to his or her identity, but identical with his or her desire. Crosby had grown up amid the social constraints imposed by her upper-class family in New York. She maintained a doomed and troublesome romanticism about Harry Crosby, nurtured or inflamed by having participated in a decade or more of taking both intellectual and physical lovers in Paris during the 1920s.

=== Political and artistic activity ===
Although Young was often drunk and infrequently home, Crosby did not lack for company. She extended an invitation to Salvador Dalí and his wife Gala, who became long-term guests, during which he wrote much of his autobiography. In 1934, Dalí and his wife attended a masquerade party in New York, hosted for them by Crosby. Other visitors included Max Ernst, Buckminster Fuller, Stuart Kaiser, Henry Miller, Anaïs Nin, Ezra Pound, and other friends from her time in Paris. She had a brief affair with Fuller during this time. By 1941, having finally divorced Young, Crosby moved to live in Washington, D.C. full-time, where she owned a home at 2008 Q Street NW from 1937 to 1950, and she opened the Caresse Crosby Modern Art Gallery, what was then the city's only modern art gallery, at 1606 Twentieth Street, near Dupont Circle. Crosby planned to open the “World Gallery of Art” at Delphi in Greece to establish a capital for her peace organization, Citizens of the World. She was already a collector of American artist Joseph Glasco’s works and she approached Glasco’s art dealer Catherine Viviano to include fourteen works by Glasco with 100 other drawings by Miro, Picasso, Calder, and others. The plan was never realized and the fate of the drawings is not known.

In December, 1943, she wrote Henry Miller to ask if he had heard about her gallery, and if he would be interested in exhibiting some of his paintings there. In 1944, she spent some time with him at his home in Big Sur and later opened his first one-man art show at her gallery.

=== Publication of Portfolio ===
With the Black Sun Press she also published Portfolio: An Intercontinental Quarterly, in which she continued her work with young and avant-garde writers and artists. She printed issues 1, 3, and 5 in the U.S. The second issue was published in Paris in December 1945, less than seven months after the end of World War II. It featured primarily French writers and artists; the fourth issue was published in Rome and focused on Italian writers and artists; and the last issue was focused on Greek artists and writers.

During World War II and for some time afterward, paper was in short supply. Crosby printed the magazine on a variety of different sizes, colors, and types of paper stock printed by different printers, stuffed into a 11.5 inches (290 mm) by 14 inches (360 mm) folder. She printed 1,000 copies of each issue, and as she had done with the Black Sun Press, giving special treatment to 100 or so deluxe copies that featured original artwork by Romare Bearden, Henri Matisse, and others. She secured contributions from a wide variety of well-known artists and writers, including: Louis Aragon, Kay Boyle, Gwendolyn Brooks, Sterling A. Brown, Charles Bukowski, Albert Camus (Letter to a German Friend, his first appearance in an English-language publication), Henri Cartier-Bresson,René Char, Paul Éluard, Jean Genet, Natalia Ginzburg, Victor Hugo, Weldon Kees, Robert Lowell, Henri Matisse, Henry Miller, Eugenio Montale, Anaïs Nin, Charles Olson, Pablo Picasso, Francis Ponge, Kenneth Rexroth, Arthur Rimbaud, Yannis Ritsos, Jean-Paul Sartre (The End of the War), Karl Shapiro, Stephen Spender, Leo Tolstoy, and Giuseppe Ungaretti. After the sixth issue, she ran out of funds and sponsors. This was her last major publishing effort.

=== Visits to Europe ===
Having left Europe in 1936, she yearned to visit her daughter Polly, who had moved to London and lived there the entire time Crosby was in Washington. Civilian travel was still very restricted after the war ended, and Crosby reached out to her friend Archibald Macleish, now Assistant Secretary of State, who helped her make travel arrangements and obtain a visa. She traveled aboard a military British Overseas Airways Corporation flying boat as the sole civilian passenger, hand-carrying her Elsa Schiaparelli hat box that contained Pietro Lazzari's drawings of horses and Romare Bearden's Passion of Christ watercolor series.

She learned after the war that Nazi troops had set up base in her home, Le Moulin du Soleil. Crosby was most upset when she learned the German troops had painted over the wall that had doubled as her guest book. Mildly ironically, along with painting over the signature of Spanish painter Salvador Dalí, who had intertwined his name with that of a Pulitzer Prize-winning American writer, William L. Laurence (who drew a phoenix), the Nazis also painted over the signature of Eva Braun, who had signed her name when she visited Harry and Caresse along with an Austrian big-game hunter she was dating at the time.

=== Post-war activity ===
Crosby became politically active again and founded the organizations Women Against War and Citizens of the World, which embraced the concept of a "world community," something other activists such as Buckminster Fuller also supported. Crosby continued her work to establish a world citizen's center in Delphi, Greece, where in 1942 she bought a small house that overlooked the Grove of Apollo. In October 1952 she attempted to visit her property, but she was met by armed guards at Corfu as she got off the ferry from Brindisi. The police placed her under house arrest in the Corfu Palace Hotel, and after three days they told her she was not welcome in Greece and ordered her to leave. The American consul told her that the Greek government thought she was still "considered dangerous to the economy and politics of Greece." After this plan failed, she created the "World Man Center" in Cyprus, which was to include a geodesic dome designed by Fuller. However this effort, too, came to naught, and she continued to search for a center for her world citizen project.

In 1953, Crosby wrote and published her autobiography, The Passionate Years. She crafted it mostly based on her personal recollection rather than a specific set of sources. It contained "many amusing and intense anecdotes ... but precious little about what was going on with him [Harry] is revealed."

=== Son's death ===
In the winter of 1954–55, Crosby's son Billy Peabody was in charge of the Paris office for American Overseas Airlines. He and his wife Josette had a small third-floor walk-up apartment on rue du Bac that they heated with a fireplace and a stove. On January 25, 1955, Billy died in his sleep of carbon monoxide poisoning, while Josette was found unconscious and was able to be revived. Crosby traveled to Paris for his funeral, yet somehow making time for appearances at colleges where she gave talks about her life and the Black Sun Press.

== Support of artist's colony ==
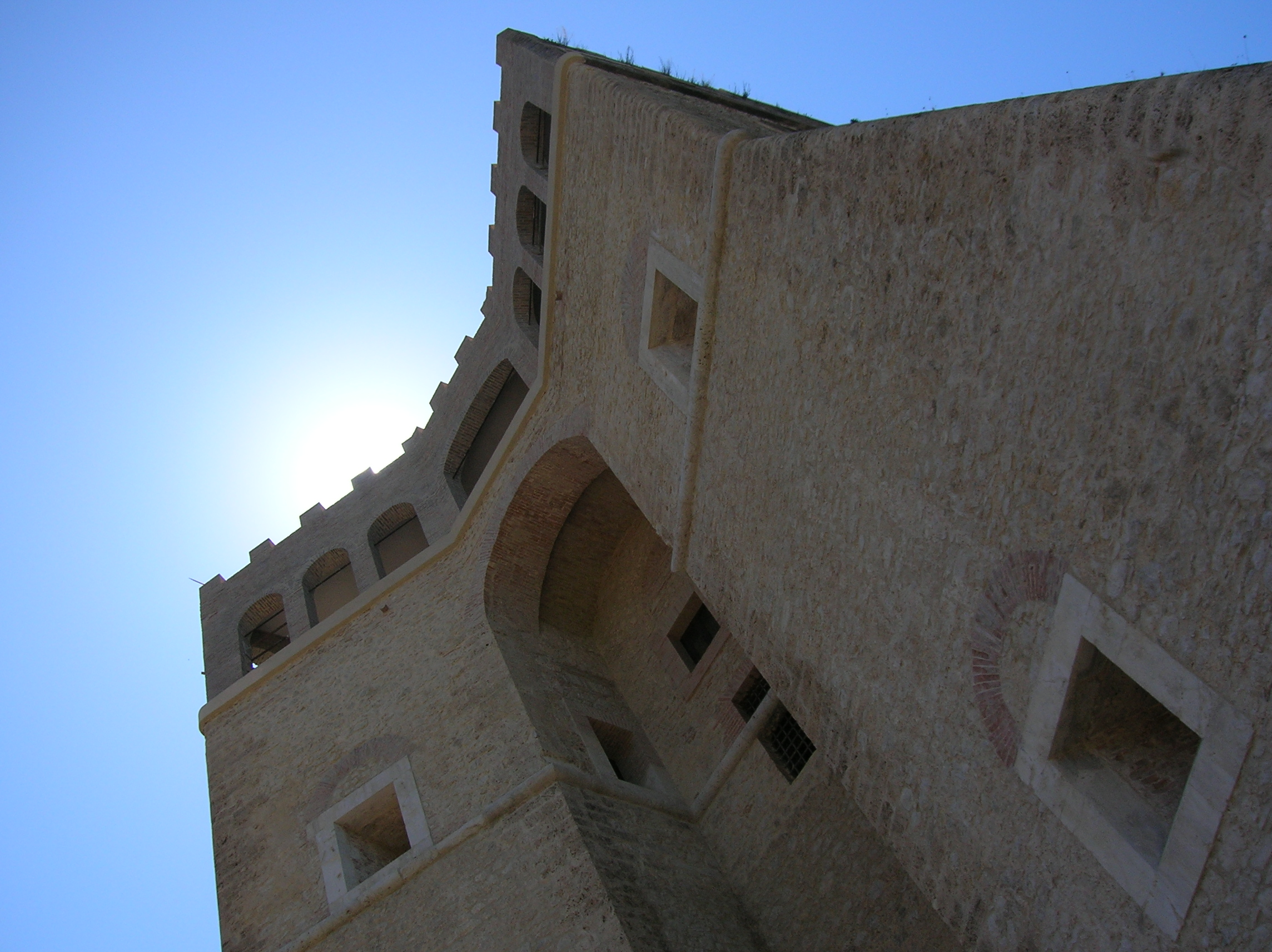
View of the Rocca Sinibalda castle's maschio (tall tower) fronting the residential palace.

In 1949 during a tour of Italy, she saw a run-down castle, Castello di Rocca Sinibalda, 70 kilometres (43 mi) north of Rome. Baldassare Peruzzi designed and built it between 1530 and 1560 for Cardinal Alessandro Cesarini. In the 1950s she rented it, and later paid US$2,600 for the estate. It came with the Papal title of Principessa (Princess). She paid to electrify the castle, and thus brought electricity to the neighboring village. She told a reporter that the castle had 320 rooms, or "at least that's what the villagers tell me," and the deed actually did list 180 of them. Many of the rooms had 21 feet (6.4 m) ceilings and the palace was virtually impossible to heat. "I wouldn't live here if you paid me," she told a reporter.

The residential portion of the palace contained three main apartments and two courtyards. The walls of the main hall were decorated by frescoes from the 16th century. She used the castle to house various artists, and she held poetry seminars. Henry Miller described Rocca Sinibalda as the "Center for Creative Arts and Humanist Living in the Abruzzi Hills." Other artists visited for as little as a weekend or up to an entire season.

In 1962, filmmaker Robert Snyder made a 26-minute documentary about Crosby's history and her plans for the castle. The short film, Always Yes, Caresse took the viewer on a tour of the castle, led by Crosby. At one point in the film, she pulls down her blouse to reveal her ample bosom for the camera. Snyder learned about Crosby's writer's retreat while he was in Rome filming a documentary on the Sistine Chapel, The Titan; The Story of Michelangelo.

For a while Crosby divided her time between Rocca Sinibalda, which in the winter was cold and unlivable, a more practical residence in Rome, Hampton Manor in Bowling Green, Virginia, her home in Washington, D.C., and her sprawling apartment in New York City. In 1953, the publisher Alvin Redman released her autobiography, The Passionate Years. She put Rocca Sinibalda up for sale in 1970, shortly before she died.

== Death ==
Suffering from heart disease, she received what was then still-experimental open heart surgery at The Mayo Clinic. She died of complications from pneumonia in Rome, Italy on January 24, 1970, aged 77. Time described her as the "literary godmother to the Lost Generation of expatriate writers in Paris." Anaïs Nin described her as "a pollen carrier, who mixed, stirred, brewed, and concocted friendships."

She had lived long enough to see many of the aspiring writers she nurtured in the 1920s become well-known and even canonical authors. The bra she invented went through a number of transformations and became a standard undergarment for women all over the world. Her first two husbands and her son Bill preceded her in death. She was survived by her daughter Polleen Peabody de Mun North Drysdale and two granddaughters. Crosby was buried in the Cimetière de l'Abbaye de Longchamp, in Boulogne, département de la Vendée, Pays de la Loire, France.

== Legacy ==
Most of her papers and manuscripts are held in the Morris Library archives Special Collections Research Center at Southern Illinois University in Carbondale, Illinois, including more than 1600 photographs from her life, along with the papers of her friends James Joyce and Kay Boyle.

In 2004, Fine Line Features optioned Andrea Berloff's first screenplay Harry & Caresse. Lasse Hallström was initially attached to direct and Leslie Holleran was attached as a producer.

== Works ==
=== As author ===
- Crosses of Gold Éditions Narcisse, Paris, 1925
- Graven Images, Houghton Mifflin, Boston, 1926
- Painted Shores Black Sun Press, Paris, 1927
- The Stranger Black Sun Press, 1927
- Impossible Melodies Black Sun Press, 1928
- Poems for Harry Crosby Black Sun Press, 1930
- The Passionate Years Dial Press, 1953

=== As editor ===
- Portfolio: An Intercontinental Quarterly Six editions, Washington, D. C.

== See also ==
- Maidenform
