= Portfolio: An Intercontinental Quarterly =

- Five of the six covers showing the folios used to publish the loose sheets contained in each issue.
- Editor: Caresse Crosby
- Categories: Folio
- Frequency: Biannual
- Circulation: 1000
- First issue: Spring 1945
- Final issue Number: Summer 1947; VI
- Company: Black Sun Press
- Country: United States
- Based in: Washington, D.C.
- Language: English

Portfolio: An Intercontinental Quarterly was a cross-disciplinary literary journal published between 1945 and 1947. It was edited by Caresse Crosby and published through her Black Sun Press. Only six issues were published, each totaling about 1000 copies. Each issue was a series of loose sheets contained in a folio, lavishly illustrated, and printed in limited numbers. Contributors included many avant-garde authors, architects, photographers, and illustrators who were prominent in their respective fields, including individuals like Albert Camus (who contributed "Letter to a German Friend," his first appearance in an English-language publication), architect Luigi Moretti, artist Pablo Picasso, and photographer Henri Cartier-Bresson, along with emerging writers like Charles Bukowski. It introduced American readers to many authors who later became famous.

== Origins and purpose ==
Caresse Crosby, a long-time patron of the arts, originally published with her husband Harry Crosby through the Black Sun Press a number of emerging writers during the 1920s and 1930s in Paris. After his suicide in December 1929, she continued their work, though less actively. The press stopped active publishing when World War II intervened and Crosby left Paris for the United States.

Towards the end of World War II, Harry T. Moore encouraged her to start a new cultural magazine, which she titled Portfolio with the desire to present to the public "lively and varied examples of work by modern artists." Each issue contained prose, poetry, prints and plans. She hoped to initiate an "exchange of thought between America and Europe" and to carry forth "a new expression of man's aspirations." She followed in the tradition of the original literary journal transition, which her husband Harry Crosby had edited. She hoped that artists of all kinds could "build a bridge of enduring fabric between the ivory tower and the arena" and contribute to rebuilding the culture of Europe. The Portfolios included work by a variety of avant-garde writers, artists, photographers, and architects. The publication featured new work, translated works of foreign writers, re-published works of writers whose work had not been widely known, and both original images and reproductions of various artist's work.

== Publishing format ==
During World War II and for some time after, paper was in short supply. Caresse printed the magazine on a variety of different sizes, colors and types of paper stock printed by different printers, stuffed into a 11.5 by 15 inches (290 mm × 380 mm) folio, though the size varied. Caresse printed 1,000 copies of each issue, and as she had done with earlier works published by the Black Sun Press, gave special treatment to 100 or so deluxe copies that featured original artwork by Henri Matisse, Romare Bearden, and others. Crosby worked from her offices at 1620 20th Street NW in Washington D.C. She lived around the corner at 2008 Q St. NW. She later moved the offices to 918 F Street, N.W.

== International publication ==
Only six issues were published. Issues 1, 3, and 5 were printed in Washington, D.C. Issue 2 was printed in Paris less than seven months after the end of World War II. It featured primarily French writers and artists. The fourth issue was published in Rome and featured Italian writers and artists. The last issue, number 6, was published in Athens and focused on Greek authors and artists.

Crosby intended to publish four issues per year, and initially offered subscriptions for US$10.00 per year. Single copies were available for $3.00 each. She originally intended to print only 1,300 copies of each issue, but in fact printed only 1000 copies of each issue.

=== Portfolio I ===
The inaugural issue was published in Washington, D.C., in 1945, immediately after the end of World War II. It included 26 leaves in loose sheets, contained in a paper folio cover. Edited by Caresse Crosby. Harry T. Moore served as assistant editor. Editorial advisers were Henry Miller for prose, Selden Rodman for poetry, and Sam Rosenberg for photography.

Prose was contributed by Caresse Crosby, René Crevel, Henry Miller (The Stuff of Life), David Daiches, Jerome Weidman (Sam). Poetry contributors included Karl Shapiro who contributed three sonnets from the Place of Love; Kay Boyle, Louis Aragon, Ruth Herschberger, Demetrios Capetanakis (Emily Dickinson) and Coleman Rosenberger, who wrote Manet in the Sale Mines at Merkers and also served as an editorial adviser.

Drawings and illustrations were produced by Jean Hélion, Romare Bearden, Henry T. Moore, Pietro Lazzari, and Lilian Swann Saarinen. Sam Rosenberg contributed both drawings and photography. Crosby included a piece penned by her late husband Harry Crosby (Anatomy of Flight), a photograph by Harry, and an unattributed portrait of Kay Boyle.

=== Portfolio II ===
Portfolio II was published in Paris near Christmas in 1945, less than seven months after the end of World War II, It contained 22 leaves in a folio. Henry Miller once again served as an editorial adviser. Contributors included Paul Éluard, Albert Camus, Jean-Paul Sartre, René Char, Francis Ponge, Kristians Tonny, Henri Matisse, Myron O'Higgins, Francis Ponge, Paul Grimault, Claude Roy, Robert Lannoy, Robert Lowell, Claude Morgan, Valdi Leduc, Weldon Kees, Mireille Sidoine, Tudal, Jerome Snyder, Louis Martin-Chauffier, Francis Gruber, Selden Rodman, and Harry T. Moore.

Artists and illustrators included Dora Maar, Henri Cartier-Bresson, and reproductions of work by Picasso, Matisse, and Alberto Giacometti.

=== Portfolio III ===
Portfolio III was published in Washington during the spring 1946. This issue included Charles Bukowski's first separately published work. His first book was not published until 1960, nearly fifteen years later. The leaves or broadsides were in various sizes, loosely contained by 17 by 12.25 inches (43.2 cm × 31.1 cm) yellow paper covers. The front was lettered in red. It contained 29 leaves enclosed in a folio, plus an unnumbered leaf of "Book Reviews" by Selden Rodman, along with a "Cover Leaf" and "Foreleaf." Only 1000 copies were printed.

Other prose contributions came from Kay Boyle, Harry Crosby, Jean-Paul Sartre, Henry Miller, Stephen Spender, García Lorca, David Daiches, Jean Genet, Kenneth Rexroth, and others. Illustrations were done by Hans Richter, Wifredo Lam, Pierre Tal-Coat, Dorothea Tanning, and others.

The issue was edited by Henry Miller, Romare Bearden, Sam Rosenberg. and Harry T. Moore.

=== Portfolio IV ===
Portfolio IV was published during the summer of 1946 in Rome. It was devoted to Italian writers and artists, including Alberto Moravia and Elio Vittorini. It contained 28 loose leaves in a folio, including three essays on contemporary Italian fiction, painting, and cinema and a short section of poetry. Henry Miller edited "in absentia."

Prose selections were included from Harry Crosby, Caresse Crosby, Bruno Zevi, and others. A series of leaves were devoted to artwork (including photography) by Giorgio Morandi (on color reproduction); Carlo Levi, Giorgio de Chirico, Giacomo Manzù, Corrado Cagli, Panayiotis Tetsis (on painting and sculpture); and Pier Luigi Nervi and Luigi Moretti (on architecture).

=== Portfolio V ===
Portfolio V was published in the spring of 1947 in Paris. The folio was 14.75 by 10.75 inches (37.5 cm × 27.3 cm) and contained 19 loose leaves of text and 11 illustrations, along with a cover leaf and table of contents.

It featured prose and poetry written by Harry T. Moore, Harry Crosby, Selden Rodman, Edwin Becker, Charles Olson, Leo Tolstoy (The Law of Love and the Law of Violence), Anaïs Nin, Emanuel Carnevale, George Mann, and others. It also included reproductions by Max Ernst, Man Ray, Carmelo, Roberto Fasola, Modigliani, Scipione, Justin Locke, Mirko, Meraud Guevara, and others.

=== Portfolio VI ===
Portfolio VI was published during the summer of 1947. It focused on writers and artists from Greece, where publisher Caresse Crosby had for some years tried to establish a world peace center. It was the largest Portfolio with 36 leaves of text and illustration. Writers included Yórgos Theotokás, Nicolas Calas, Cambas, D. Nicolareizis, and others. She published contributions from Nikos Hadjikyriakos-Ghikas, a sculptor, engraver, iconographer, writer and academic, and from painter and poet Nikos Engonopoulos. Illustrations were provided by Yannis Moralis, Kanellis, Kapralos, Diamantopoulos, and others.

== Ceases publication ==
Crosby had already begun work on an issue focusing on Ireland and a "Negro" issue. When she did not attract more sponsors, she finally decided she could not absorb the risk of publishing further issues. She stopped publication with Issue VI. She had intended to publish four issues per year, and never achieved that goal.

== Current value ==
A complete set of all six issues of Portfolio in fine quality was valued in 2010 by fine book seller Sim Reed Limited at £4,049 (about €4860 or $6157). A collection missing two leaves from one issue, in very good condition, was sold in 2008 by PBA Galleries for $1,471 (about €1164 or £1343).
