= Women Against War =

Anti-war organistions

Women Against War (WAW) is the name of two organizations of women opposed to war. The first of these organizations was created in the 1950s in response to the Vietnam War. The second is the currently operating organization working out of Delmar, New York.

== Past ==
The Vietnam War played a major role in the creation of many anti-war organizations. This war had heavy disdain from the general population

Mary Phelps Jacob, later known as Caresse Crosby, founded the organization during the 1950s. Part of her work for WAW was her attempt to establish a Peace Act of 1950. In an attempt to support the bill, she proposed "Peace Bonds" that would be similar to the savings bonds the government put out. Jacob also lobbied for a Department of Peace. Her work was not embraced by those she attempted to appeal to. She also worked to create a group known as the "Citizens of the World."

During the time of WAW, there was another women's anti-war activist group known as Women Strike for Peace, which worked for and succeeded in obtaining a nuclear test ban, and a student-led group called the Student Peace Union.

== Present ==
The modern WAW group was created by women in the Capital Region and surrounding communities. The vision statement of the organization is that "War is Not the Answer" and that women can help to develop alternatives to violence. Activities that the Women Against War group has taken part in include:

- Fast for Peace
- Voices and Bells
- The Peace Tent

Current projects:

- Pathways to Peace is an arm of WAW that undertakes specific efforts, which focus on a new theme each year. The upcoming year (2020) will center on climate change, particularly its effects on immigration, as a contributor to war, and with reference to the coronavirus pandemic. Events such as vigils, presentations by speakers, leafletting, meetings with legislators, letter-writing campaigns, etc., are all part of its outreach to the community and beyond.
- Iraqi Refugee Project
- Grannies for Peace

The WAW organization also supports a Facebook page.

== Future ==
The WAW group works continuously to lay the foundation for a peaceful world. They seem to be using the political process theory described by sociologists as being focused on openings in the formal political system.

== See also ==
- War resister
