= Peabody =

Peabody may refer to:

== Libraries ==
- Peabody Institute Library (Peabody, Massachusetts), public library in Peabody, Massachusetts
- George Peabody Library, the historical library at the Peabody Institute in Baltimore
- Peabody Township Library, a city library in Peabody, Kansas

== Museums ==
- Peabody Essex Museum, a museum of art and culture in Salem, Massachusetts
- Peabody Historical Library Museum, in Peabody, Kansas
- Peabody Museum of Archaeology and Ethnology at Harvard University in Cambridge, Massachusetts
- Peabody Museum of Natural History at Yale University in New Haven, Connecticut
- Robert S. Peabody Museum of Archaeology at Phillips Academy in Andover, Massachusetts

== Music ==
- Peabody Institute, a music conservatory at Johns Hopkins University in Baltimore, Maryland
- Peabody (band), Australian music group
- Peabody (dance), a fast foxtrot-type dance done to ragtime music

== Places ==
=== United States ===
- Peabody, Indiana
- Peabody, Kansas
  - Peabody Downtown Historic District
  - Peabody City Park
- Peabody, Massachusetts
  - Peabody Veterans Memorial High School
- Peabody, Cambridge, Massachusetts, a neighborhood
- Peabody River, in New Hampshire
- Peabody boulders (Grandpa and Grandma Peabody), two high boulders in the Buttermilks, California.

=== Elsewhere ===
- Peabody Bay, Greenland

== Other uses ==
- Peabody (surname)
- Peabody action, a type of firearm action
- Peabody Award, for radio and television journalism
- Peabody bird, the American white-throated sparrow
- Peabody Energy, an American coal mining, distribution, and brokerage company
- Peabody Hotel, a hotel in Memphis, Tennessee, United States
- Peabody Picture Vocabulary Test, a type of intelligence test
- Peabody Trust, a housing association in London, now branded simply as Peabody
- Mister Peabody, a fictional dog in 1950s and 1960s television animated series
  - Mr. Peabody & Sherman, a 2014 animated film based on the TV series

== See also ==
- Peabody High School (disambiguation)
