= Clarence B. Farrar =

American psychiatrist

Clarence Bynold Farrar, SM (November 27, 1874 – June 3, 1970) was an influential psychiatrist, the first Director of the Toronto Psychiatric Hospital (succeeded in 1966 by the Clarke Institute), and editor of The American Journal of Psychiatry for 34 years.

Born in Cattaraugus, New York, Farrar studied at Allegheny College and Harvard before earning his M.D. from Johns Hopkins Medical School. Farrar studied under William Osler at Hopkins followed by postgraduate study with Emil Kraepelin, Franz Nissl, and Alois Alzheimer.

As a chief psychiatrist for the Canadian Army, Captain Farrar researched psychiatric cases of soldiers with shell shock and published his findings with Charles Kirk Clarke.

Farrar worked at various times as an assistant physician and director of laboratories at Sheppard and Enoch Pratt Hospital, associate in psychiatry at the Johns Hopkins Medical School, assistant physician at Trenton State Hospital, lecturer in abnormal psychology at Princeton University, head of Homewood Sanitarium in Guelph, medical director of Toronto Psychiatric Hospital and the head of the department of psychiatry at the University of Toronto. Farrar retired as professor emeritus in 1947 from the University of Toronto.

Farrar's contributions to the field of psychiatry were recognized through honorary doctorates from McGill University and the University of Toronto, the Medal of Service of the Order of Canada from the Governor General of Canada, and the Distinguished Service Award of the Thomas W. Salmon Committee on Psychiatry and Mental Hygiene of the New York Academy of Medicine.

Farrar was a noted critic of the Emmanuel Movement. He was also a member of the Eugenics Society of Canada, and, believing that heredity was the primary cause of mental illness, supported some arguments regarding compulsory sterilization of "mental deficients".

He also published a paper on anomalistic psychology. Farrar wrote there was no evidence for the claims of Spiritualism and that mediumship phenomena could be explained by delusion, fantasy and fraud.

Some of Farrar's archives can be found at the Osler Library of History of Medicine, McGill University. A much larger collection of his archives are held at the University of Toronto Archives and Records Management Services.
