= Isador Coriat =

American psychiatrist and neurologist

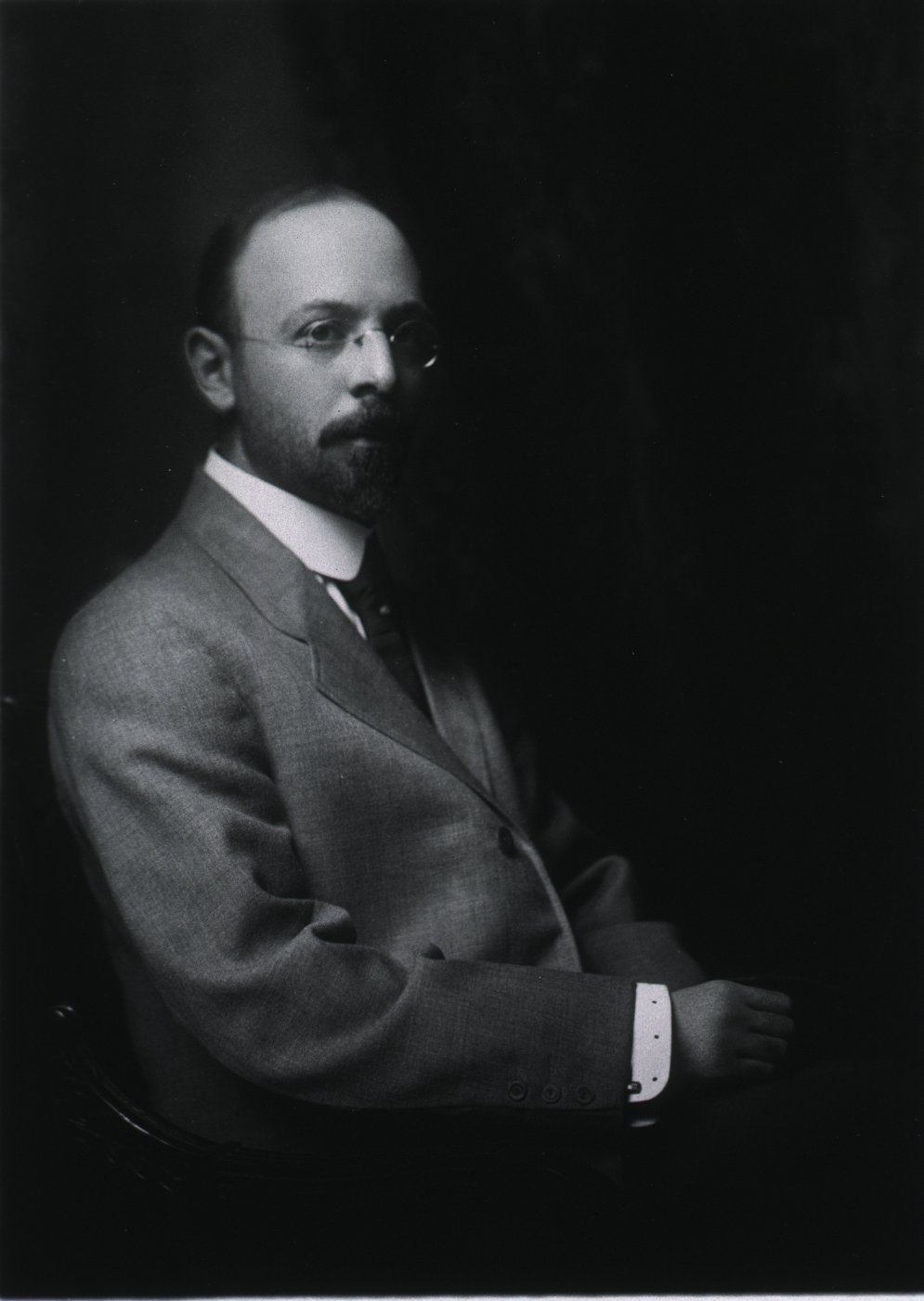
- Born: December 10, 1875; Philadelphia, United States
- Died: May 26, 1943 (aged 67); Boston, United States
- Education: Tufts Medical School (1900)
- Occupations: Psychiatrist, neurologist
- Spouse: Etta Dann
- Parent(s): Hyram Coriat; Clara née Einstein

Isador Henry Coriat (December 10, 1875 – May 26, 1943) was an American psychiatrist and neurologist of Moroccan-Jewish descent. He was one of the first American psychoanalysts.

== Biography ==
He was born in Philadelphia in 1875 as the son of Harry (Hyram) Coriat, a Sephardi Jew native of Marrakesh, who emigrated to the United States from France in 1867, and Clara née Einstein. The Coriat Jewish family was said to have come from Spain on their father's side, Thomas Coryat was supposed to belong to it, and was German on their mother's side. He grew up in Boston and attended Tufts Medical School, graduating in 1900.

He was one of the founders of Boston Psychoanalytic Society, the first secretary in 1914 and president in years 1930–32. Coriat was the only Freudian analyst in Boston during the period after James Jackson Putnam's death.

Coriat worked with the Rev. Elwood Worcester, served as the medical expert for the Emmanuel Movement and co-authored Religion and Medicine; The Moral Control of Nervous Disorders.

Coriat married Etta Dann on February 1, 1904. He died on May 26, 1943, after a brief illness.

== Selected works ==
- Abnormal Psychology. New York, Moffat, Yard, 1910
- The Hysteria of Lady Macbeth. New York, Moffat, Yard and company, 1912
- “The Oedipus-Complex in the Psychoneuroses,” The Journal of Abnormal Psychology, 7(3) (Aug.-Sept. 1912): 176-195.
- “Homosexuality, its Psychogenesis and Treatment,” New York Medical Journal (March 22, 1913).
- The Meaning of Dreams. Boston, Little, Brown, and company, 1915
- Repressed Emotions. New York, Brentano's 1920
- Religion and Medicine; The Moral Control of Nervous Disorders. By Elwood Worcester, Samual McComb [and] Isador M. Coriat. New York, Moffat, Yard & company, 1908
- Stammering, a Psychoanalytic Interpretation. N.Y. : 1928
- What is Psychoanalysis? New York : Moffat, Yard & Co., 1917
- Sex and Hunger. Psychoanal Rev 8, 375-381 (1921) link
- The Sadism in Oscar Wilde's “Salome”. Psychoanal Rev 1, 257-259 (1914) link
- Humor and hypomania. Psychiatric Quarterly 13, 4, s. 681-688 (1939) 10.1007/BF01571533
- “The Structure of the Ego,” The Psychoanalytic Quarterly 9(3) (1940): 380–393.
- “Some Personal Reminiscences of Psychoanalysis in Boston: An Autobiographical Note,” The Psychoanalytic Review 32(1) (January 1945): 1–8.
- “Obituary: Isador H. Coriat,” The Psychoanalytic Review 30(4) (October 1943): 479–483.
