= Richard R. Peabody =

American psychotherapist (1892–1936)

Richard Rogers Peabody
- Born: January 23, 1892; Boston, Massachusetts, US
- Died: April 26, 1936 (aged 44); Manchester, Vermont, US
- Other name: Dick Peabody
- Known for: Author, The Common Sense of Drinking
- Spouse(s): Mary Phelps Jacob (1915–1922); Jane McKean

Richard Rogers Peabody (23 January 1892 – 26 April 1936) was an American psychotherapist who specialized in alcoholism.

Peabody grew up as a member of the upper class in Boston, Massachusetts. He attended Groton, where his grandfather was headmaster, and later enrolled at Harvard as had many of his family before him. He married Polly Jacob, the daughter of another blue-blooded Boston family, with whom he had two children. He served as a captain during World War I in the American Expeditionary Force.

Upon returning from World War I he became an alcoholic. His lost his inheritance because of his drinking and his wife to an affair. After their divorce, he sought help through the Emmanuel Movement and later wrote a book, The Common Sense of Drinking, in which he described a secularized treatment methodology. He was the first authority to proclaim that there was no cure for alcoholism. His book became a best seller and was a major influence on Alcoholics Anonymous founder Bill Wilson. He died at age 44.

== Early life ==
Born on 23 Jan 1892 to Jacob Crowninshield Rogers Peabody and Florence Dumaresq Wheatland, his family was among the upper-class of Boston society. By the early 20th century a case could be made that the Peabodies had supplanted the Cabots and the Lodges as the most distinguished name in the region.

As a youth, Peabody attended Groton, a small and elite prep school that his uncle, the Reverend Endicott Peabody, founded. He then attended Harvard, although he did not graduate, perhaps due to his growing fondness for alcohol. His great-great-grandfather was Salem shipowner and privateer Joseph Peabody who made a fortune importing pepper from Sumatra as well as opium from Eastern-Asia and was one of the wealthiest men in the United States at the time of his death in 1844. Another of his ancestors was Massachusetts Bay Colony Governor John Endecott, who ordered the hanging of non-conformist Quakers, but who none-the-less was a friend of Roger Williams.

== Marriage ==
In 1915, with his uncle Reverend Endicott Peabody officiating, he married his long-time girlfriend, 24-year-old Mary "Polly" Jacob. Polly was a debutante who at age 19 had received a patent for the first modern brassiere. They lived in a stone cottage on Quaker Ridge and Dick commuted to a job at Johns-Manville in Manhattan. After a year of marriage, Polly became pregnant, and because the icy steps of the stone cottage were unsafe, they moved to an apartment on Fifty-third Street in New York.

Polly found Dick's temperament to be far from her own. When they had a son, William Jacob, on February 4, 1916. Dick was at first excited to become a father, but soon tired of the demanding infant that took up so much of his wife's time and energy. Polly found "Dick was not the most indulgent of parents and like his father before him, he forbade the gurgles and cries of infancy; when they occurred he walked out, and often walked back unsteadily."

Polly concluded that Dick was a well-educated but undirected man and a reluctant father. Less than a year later Dick Peabody enlisted at the Mexican border where he enlisted in Battery A, Boston's "crack militia," which was charged with stopping Pancho Villa's cross-border raids. Polly and Billy moved in with Dick's parents at their North Shore estate where they summered. Less than a year after he returned home, he enlisted to fight in World War I. Their second child, a daughter, Poleen Wheatland ("Polly"), was born on August 12, 1917, but Dick was already in Officers Training Camp at Plattsburgh, New York, where he was commissioned a second lieutenant in the artillery.

Dick became a captain in the United States Army's 15th Field Artillery, 2nd Division, American Expeditionary Force. Polly was largely cared for by his parents, but found, "My father-in-law was a stickler for polish, both of manners and minerals." Her mother-in-law wore "nun-like dresses and in bed or out wore starched cuffs as sever as piping." Her husband meanwhile was enjoying life at the front as a bachelor.

When the war ended, Richard remained in Paris for a while, enjoying the adulation of the French. When he returned to the United States, he started a shipping business of his own using Polly's inheritance for capital. In April they moved back to the stone cottage at Quaker Ridge. Dick's shipping business went under. Polly and Billy moved in with Dick's parents at their North Shore estate where they summered.

== Service in World War I ==
Less than a year after Peabody returned from the Mexican Revolution, he re-enlisted during the summer of 1917 and began training at the Officers Training Camp at Plattsburgh, New York, where he was commissioned as a Second Lieutenant in the 15th Field Artillery, 2nd Division, American Expeditionary Force. Bill Wilson who would later found Alcoholics Anonymous trained at the same camp that summer and was commissioned a Second Lieutenant in Battery C of the 66th Coastal Artillery. Their lives would intersect again in the 1930s when both would become involved in treating alcoholism. On August 12, 1917, Richard and Polly had a daughter, Poleen Wheatland (also nicknamed "Polly"). A week and a half after Polly was born, her mother took her to see her father off to war in France. Mother and daughter moved in with Polly Peabody's mother in Windward, Massachusetts. In the fall of 1917 she moved in with her in-laws at their home in Danvers, Massachusetts.

In the middle of 1921, Dick Peabody suddenly returned home from France to his new station in Columbia, South Carolina. He summoned his wife to meet him, and she borrowed money from her children's nurse and her uncle for the train fare to Columbia. They had sex and slept the night in a slit trench because all the hotels were full. Polly found an apartment and moved her children and the nurse down to Columbia. When the war ended in November, Dick was left to live off a family allowance. After life as a captain in the artillery, where he had been awarded the Croix de Guerre and had lived life like a bachelor, domestic life with Polly and the two children was a letdown, and he took up drinking heavily again. In the spring of 1922, in an attempt to dry out. Dick was committed to a sanitarium again.

Polly found after the war that Dick had only three real interests, all acquired at Harvard: to play, to drink, and to turn out, at any hour, to chase fire engines. Peabody even persuaded the fire chief to wire a fire alarm bell to his house. Polly's life was difficult during the war years, and when her husband returned home and resumed drinking, her commitment to her marriage was further weakened. Polly felt that her husband was a well-educated but undirected man and a reluctant father.

== Wife's affair ==
While Dick had been at war, his wife Polly had been carrying on a not-very-secret affair. Mrs. Henrietta Crosby saw in Mrs. Polly Peabody a trustworthy mother who could chaperone her son Harry Crosby and some of his friends to a party on July 4, 1920. It included dinner and a trip to the amusement park at Nantasket Beach. Crosby, breaking decorum, never spoke to the girl on his left that he was supposed to spend time with, but focused his attention on the buxom Mrs. Peabody. By some accounts, Crosby fell in love with her in about two hours, confessing his love for her in the Tunnel of Love at the amusement park. Two weeks later they went to church together in Manchester-by-the-Sea, and spent the night together. Polly was seen as an adulteress who had perverted the trust placed in her as a chaperone, an older woman who had taken advantage of a younger man. To the Crosbys, she was dishonored and corrupt. Her scandalous affair was the gossip of blue-blood Boston. She was 28, six years older than Harry, with two small children, and married.

== Divorce ==
Crosby pursued Mrs. Peabody and in May 1921, when she would not respond to his ardor, he threatened suicide if she did not marry him. Dick Peabody was in and out of sanatoriums fighting alcoholism and acute depression several times. Polly had become so afraid of him that she refused to stay alone with him, even appealing to her uncle, J. P. Morgan, Jr., for moral and financial support. Crosby pestered Polly Peabody to tell her husband of their affair and to divorce him. In May she revealed her adultery to Peabody, and without any resistance he offered her a divorce. In June, she formally separated from her husband. Her mother insisted that she stop seeing Crosby for six months, a condition she agreed to, and she left Boston for New York. In December Peabody initiated the divorce and in February 1922, the divorce was finalized.

== Recovery from alcoholism ==
The Peabody family had been one of the wealthiest in America during the 1800s. Peabody lost his share of the family fortune in shipping during the war when everyone else was becoming rich. Having lost his family and his fortune, he sought help with his alcoholism and began attending a clinic and weekly health classes in the winter of 1921–1922 at the Emmanuel Church. When he got sober he began offering therapy to other alcoholics on an individual basis. During the 1920s he opened an office on Newbury Street in Boston. He was very successful in helping others and although he was not a medical doctor became known to some as Dr. Peabody. Patients came to him from long distances.

For his practice, Peabody adapted methods used by the Emmanuel Movement from Dr. Elwood Worcester and Courtenay Baylor, excluding fellowship and any spiritual or religious elements. He prescribed a method for getting and staying sober that included rigid scheduling, self-control and work to bring feelings and emotions under control through reason.

== Professional activities ==
Peabody had a “short but successful career as an independent lay therapist helping alcoholics."^{:176}

=== Publications ===
Peabody published a number of articles in the popular press and medical literature. His only book, The Common Sense of Drinking, appeared in 1931 and became a "runaway best-seller."

=== The Peabody Method ===
Peabody first described his psychotherapeutic approach in two oral presentations in 1928. The addresses were subsequently published in 1930 in the medical journal, Mental Hygiene. He further elaborated on his method in his book, The Common Sense of Drinking.

“The treatment may be subdivided as follows: (1) analysis; (2) relaxation and suggestion; (3) auto-relaxation and auto-suggestion; (4) general discussion, which might be called persuasion in the manner of Dubois or readjustment after McDougall; (5) outside reading; (6) development where possible of one or more interests or hobbies; (7) exercise; (8) operating on a daily schedule; (9) thought direction and thought control in the conscious mind."^{:115}

==== 1. Analysis ====
During this initial phase, "The patient is encouraged to give a full account of his past history and present situation. I try to make the analysis as thorough as possible, but do not go into the unconscious. There are cases of compulsive periodic dipsomania which would unquestionably require a psychoanalysis, but I have not met one of them yet."^{:115}

"A mental analysis is made wherein the drinker learns that certain actions and systems of thinking, past as well as present, have directed him on the unfortunate course he has been pursuing, by creating doubts, fears, and conflicts. When these were removed his energy is free to take up more interesting and constructive occupations."^{:187}

==== 2. Relaxation and Suggestion ====
"Relaxation and suggestion, is, as far as I can determine, what Boris Sidis has called hypnoidal suggestion, and has referred to it as being particularly effective in the treatment of alcoholism. The patient is put into a state of abstraction. He is asked to close his eyes, breathe slowly, and think of the more prominent muscles when they are mentioned as becoming relaxed. The cadence of the voice is made increasingly monotonous, ending with the suggestion that the patient is drowsier and sleepier. This lasts for five minutes, and then an equal amount of time is spent in giving simple constructive ideas."^{:116}

"Various factors contribute to an abnormal state of tension which drink temporarily releases, only to aggravate it in the long run. This tension can be permanently removed by learning formal relaxation and suggestion."^{:187}

"The unconscious mind can be influenced by suggestion so that it coöperates with the conscious to bring about a consistent, intelligent course of action."^{:188}

"This next phase of the work is that of relaxation and suggestion. This well-known method of psychotherapy has a twofold purpose. First, to remove the emotional tenseness from the conscious mind; second, to educate the unconscious so that it will function in harmony with the desires of the conscious."^{:132}

==== 3. Auto-Relaxation and Auto-Suggestion ====
"Most important also is the application of the same measures [relaxation and suggestion] by the individual himself before going to sleep at night. Ideas that occupy the mind at that time have a particularly effective influence on the thoughts and actions of the succeeding day."^{:116}

==== 4. Discussion and Persuasion ====
"The following ideas form the substance of what I have designated as discussion or persuasion. These thoughts are repeated over and over again to the patient in one form or another. The first thing to impress on his mind is the fact that he is a drunkard and as such to be definitely distinguished from his moderate or even hard-drinking friends; furthermore, that he can never successfully drink anything containing alcohol."^{:120}

==== 5. Outside Reading ====
"It is often helpful in influencing the trend of thinking to read books of a constructive nature […]. Books which would influence in this manner are biographies or autobiographies of men who have become successful. […] Such books as interest the patient must be read in a careful manner, and the ideas which particularly appeal to him should be marked. […] [T]he patient is to gather together a group of ideas which will contribute to the construction of a new philosophy of life."^{:147ff.}

"Writing as well as reading is of benefit to the patient. It helps to crystallize in his mind the ideas that he has received. He may write an exposition of his personal reaction to the treatment so far as he has progressed in it, or he may write a letter to an imaginary friend describing how the alcoholic habit can be eliminated."^{:149}

==== 6. Interests or Hobbies ====
"Development of new interests is obviously a most important part of any therapeutic treatment. The only way to remove destructive ideas from a person's mind is to introduce constructive ones. For a man to occupy himself solely with a thought that he is not going to drink would be such a sterile performance that it would probably not be true, for long at any rate. An alcoholic has one idea of pleasure, and it is of the greatest importance that he discover as soon as possible that he can enjoy life in many ways outside of intoxication if he will lift himself to a more intelligent plane of thought and action."^{:117}

"One method, obviously, of arousing a normal interest is reading. There is a short list of books that patients are asked to read carefully, marking the passages that appeal to them. These passages are later copied into a notebook along with some typewritten sheets that are given to them, the most important of which I shall outline when I come to the subject of persuasion. These books are self-help essays of a practical rather than a religious or sentimental nature."^{:119}

==== 7. Exercise ====
"The importance of a reasonable amount of exercise each day, as well as obedience to the ordinary rules of hygiene, cannot be overemphasized. A mind can function properly only in a well-regulated body, and an alcoholic in process of reorganization needs to have his mind function as near 100 per cent properly as he can all the time. While on the subject of hygiene, I might add that precautions are taken to find out if the individual is as physically healthy as possible, and if he has not recently been examined, he is urged to get in touch with his physician."^{:119}

==== 8. Operating on a Daily Schedule ====
"There must be action – forceful, purposive, intelligent, and sustained; and there is no better way to produce this action than to plan and execute one’s life according to a self-imposed, prearranged schedule. To be explicit: before going to bed the patient should write down on a piece of paper the different hours of the following day, beginning with the time of arising. Then, so far as can be determined beforehand, he should fill in these hours with what he plans to do. Throughout the day notations should be made if exceptions have occurred in the original plans, and it should be indicated whether these exceptions have been due to legitimate or rationalized excuses."^{:157}

"The schedule contributes to the reintegration of character in three ways, all of them important. First, it prevents idleness. […] Second, the schedule brings to the attention of the alcoholic the fact that he is doing something concrete about changing his condition, something more than mere discussion and reflection. One of the chief difficulties of the treatment is its seeming vagueness outside of the central theme (abstinence), and so the more reality that can be brought into the work, the surer and quicker the favorable outcome. […]. The third and most important of all reasons for employing the schedule is the training that it gives the individual in executing his own commands."^{:160}

==== 9. Thought Direction and Thought Control ====
"We now come to the most important phase of the treatment, the central feature to which all others are expected to contribute. That is thought direction and control. A person literally thinks himself out of his alcoholic habit, and his ability permanently to control or direct his thoughts is the determining factor in his success or failure."^{:119}

=== Practice in New York ===
After his book was published in 1931, Peabody moved from Boston to New York City. He began practicing out of his new home at 24 Gramercy Park, where he charged US$20 per visit. “However, I always alter it to whatever I think the individual can pay. I never permit the fee to stand in the way of anyone who wants to get well."^{:227}

Peabody's practice was in the same neighborhood as Calvary Episcopal Church on East 23rd Street where the Rev. Samuel Moor Shoemaker was Rector and active in the Oxford Group, and near the Olive Tree Inn that Alcoholics Anonymous founder Bill W.'s friend Ebby Thacher went to. The Calvary Church's Rescue Mission was where Bill W. took his pledge of sobriety.

=== Effectiveness ===
Francis T. Chambers, Jr., noted, "Mr. Peabody cured many abnormal drinkers; [...].” Raymond G. McCarthy reported, "A number of individuals who experienced Peabody's program recovered and extended it to various parts of the country." He later stated, "There emerged in Boston a program developed by Richard Peabody which apparently worked quite well for a number of alcoholics."

== Clinical legacy ==
Karl M. Bowman and E.M. Jellinek declared, “In this country [United States], Peabody has probably exerted more influence than anyone else on the psychotherapy of alcohol addiction.”^{:67} Dwight Anderson indicated, "The late Richard R. Peabody made a notable contribution to therapy. Through his students, many of whom became lay therapists themselves, his techniques have been perpetuated. Most of them are embodied in his book, The Common Sense of Drinking."

Raymond G. McCarthy noted, "Probably Peabody as much as anyone is responsible for introducing into the popular vocabulary the word ‘alcoholism' and substituting ‘alcoholic' for the emotionally charged label ‘drunkard.’ "

Peabody trained various lay therapists including Samuel Crocker; James Bellamy; Francis T. Chambers, Jr.; William Wynne Wister; and Wilson McKay. Health professionals also adopted his method including Norman Jolliffe at Bellevue Hospital in New York; Merrill Moore at Boston City Hospital; and Edward Strecker at the Institute of Pennsylvania Hospital in Philadelphia. McCarthy, who was “influenced by the philosophy of Richard Peabody," carried on pioneering work at Yale and Rutgers.

Chambers joined the staff of the Institute of Pennsylvania Hospital in 1935. "The therapy I use, with the co-operation of physicians, treats alcoholism as a mental illness and follows lines laid down by the late Richard Peabody of Boston. Mr. Peabody cured many abnormal drinkers; indeed, he cured me. For fifteen years of my life I was an alcoholic; I submitted to almost a dozen ‘cures' which failed to cure. It was Mr. Peabody who showed me how to cure myself." Chambers co-authored a book, Alcohol: One's Man Meat, with Strecker. The approach to treatment described largely follows Peabody's method.

The Yale Center of Alcohol Studies opened the first free clinic devoted solely to treating alcoholism in 1944. Its clinics were directed by McCarthy.

The Quarterly Journal of Studies on Alcohol published a Lay Supplements series from 1941–1955. Peabody’s book is listed among the “selected reading” in the most popular issue, “The Drinker and the Drunkard,” which was printed 12 times between 1944 and 1955.^{:16}

Ernest Kurtz indicated, “[T]he approach of Richard R. Peabody, as developed by Francis Chambers and popularized especially by the talented writer Jim Bishop, not only preceded in time [Bill] Wilson’s own sobriety but was well into the 1950s accepted and endorsed by many doctors and clergy much more enthusiastically than was Alcoholics Anonymous."^{:158}

== Alcoholics Anonymous ==
Bill Pittman noted, “Bill Wilson had first gone to Sam Shoemaker’s Calvary Church Mission in November 1934 and although physical proximity does not mean acquaintance, one wonders if possibly Wilson and/or Shoemaker knew Richard Peabody. Nell Wing does remember Bill Wilson saying he did meet Peabody."^{:186} Wing was Wilson's secretary from 1950–1971 and an archivist at the General Service Office (G.S.O.) of Alcoholics Anonymous from 1971–1982. She advised Pittman that “there were at least 10 books that were read by Bill Wilson and others between 1935 and 1939 that were helpful to them,” including Peabody’s book.^{:182,192} A copy of Common Sense owned by Wilson is now held in the G.S.O. Archives.^{:61} Dr. Bob also kept a copy of Common Sense in his personal library, which is now archived at Brown University as the “Dr. Bob” Collection.

Wilson may have borrowed phrases from Peabody's book. For example, Peabody’s “once a drunkard always a drunkard" became “once an alcoholic, always an alcoholic” in the Big Book.^{:33} Similarly, Peabody's "halfway measures are of no avail"^{:99} became "half measures availed us nothing."^{:59}

It is often claimed that the vignette about the "man of thirty”^{:32} in the Big Book was lifted from Peabody’s book.^{:123} While the stories share some common features, historian William Schaberg believes that the individual in the Big Book was "someone Bill [Wilson] knew from personal experience or whom he had heard about from the personnel at Towns Hospital."^{:287}

Early Alcoholics Anonymous members "sought inspiration and guidance” from various sources, including Peabody’s book. Peabody and Common Sense were mentioned in early issues of The Grapevine.

== Death ==
Peabody died on April 26, 1936, in Manchester, Vermont.

Peabody's obituary in The New York Times stated that he died of a heart attack. A subsequent death listing with funeral information indicated that he died "suddenly, of heart failure." Obituaries in regional newspapers attributed his death to a "heart ailment."

Scribner's Magazine published an article written by Peabody in its June 1936 issue. The associated author profile stated, "Richard R. Peabody, author of 'The Danger Line of Drink,’ died of a heart attack on April 26, just as this number was going to press.”^{:383} His wife, Jane McKean, advised Willam Wynne Wister, “He had had a very bad cold and a local doctor came and said that it had developed into pneumonia and that Dick must stay in bed. Well, he gave Dick some medicine and that night Dick died in his sleep."^{:242} His former wife, Caresse Crosby, noted, "Dick and I remained devoted friends until the end. I was in Paris when the news of his untimely death reached me.”^{:92} She did not mention his cause of death.

On the other hand, Katherine McCarthy noted, “A common opinion is that Peabody died intoxicated, although the evidence is not conclusive” and that “published sources contradict each other."^{:60,61} She indicated, "Samuel Crocker, who had once shared an office with Peabody, told Faye R. that he was intoxicated at the time of his death. The personal copy of Peabody’s book belonging to Bill Wilson (one of the founders of A.A.), now in the A.A. Archives, contains the following inscription: ‘Dr. Peabody was as far is known the first authority to state, “once an alcoholic, always an alcoholic,” and he proved it by returning to drinking and dying of alcoholism [...].’ This copy was originally owned by Rosa Burwell of Philadelphia."^{:60–61}(Burwell was the wife of Jim Burwell, a pioneering member of Alcoholics Anonymous)

Peabody’s death record, filed in Manchester, Vermont, on June 17, 1936, admits various possibilities and is ultimately not dispositive. The principal cause of death was stated to be "acute cardiac dilatation" in the context of "chronic myocarditis." “Chronic alcoholism” was noted to be a contributing cause.

Peabody was survived by Crosby; McKean; his son, William, and daughter, Polly. He is buried in Harmony Grove Cemetery in Salem, Massachusetts.

== Works ==
- Peabody, Richard R. (1930). "Psychotherapeutic Procedure in the Treatment of Chronic Alcoholism". Mental Hygiene. 14 (1): 109–128 – via Internet Archive. ["Read before the Boston Society of Psychiatry and Neurology, April 18, 1928, and before the Harvard Psychological Clinic, December 14, 1928. The treatment outlined in this article has been carried on by Courtenay Baylor for seventeen years.”]
- Peabody, Richard R. (1930). "Psychotherapy for Alcoholics". New England Journal of Medicine. 202 (25): 1199–1202. doi:10.1056/NEJM193006192022505 – via Internet Archive. [Described as a condensation of his article in Mental Hygiene. Peabody's postal address in Boston appears on Page 1220]
- Peabody, Richard R. (1930). "Psychotherapeutic Treatment of Inebriates". British Journal of Inebriety. 28 (2): 55–60. doi:10.1111/j.1360-0443.1930.tb05478.x – via Wiley Online Library. [Also described as a condensation of his article in Mental Hygiene]
- Peabody, Richard R. (1931). The Common Sense of Drinking. Boston: Little, Brown, and Company. Open AccessDust wrapper
- Peabody, Richard R. (1931). "Why Men Drink". American Magazine. 62 (3): 22–23, 94–102. Archived from the original on 2023-02-06 – via Internet Archive.
- Peabody, Richard R. (1931). "Why Prohibition Has Failed". American Mercury. 22 (88): 385–391. Archived from the original on 2023-02-06 – via Internet Archive.
- Peabody, Richard R. (1936). "The Danger Line of Drink". Scribner's Magazine. 99 (6): 370–372 – via Internet Archive. [Author profile appears on Page 383]
