= Emmanuel Movement =

Psychotherapy approach, 1906–1931

The Emmanuel Movement was a psychologically-based approach to religious healing introduced in 1906 as an outreach of the Emmanuel Church in Boston, Massachusetts. In practice, the religious element was de-emphasized and the primary modalities were individual and group therapy. Episcopal priests Elwood Worcester and Samuel McComb established a clinic at the church which lasted 23 years and offered both medical and psychological services. The primary long-term influence of the movement, however, was on the treatment of alcoholism.

== Religious background: Worcester and McComb ==
Elwood Worcester (1862–1940) was the originator of the Emmanuel movement philosophy. He was raised in an educated middle-class family which fell into poverty as a result of business reversals and the death of Worcester's father. After high school, Worcester went to work at a railway claim-department office. One day, while alone in the office, he had an experience of the room filling with light and heard the words, "Be faithful to me and I will be faithful to you." After discussing the experience with his priest, Algernon Crapsey, he became convinced that he was called to the ministry. At the time he was supporting his family, but he later entered Columbia University on scholarship and earned a bachelor's degree with highest honors.

As a candidate for orders Worcester was required to attend a recognized seminary, in spite of his own conviction that he would be better prepared by attending a German university. He was able to satisfy the requirements for the first two years of General Seminary in New York by studying the texts and passing examinations. He then graduated from the Seminary after only one year of full-time attendance and immediately left for Germany to enter the University of Leipzig. After an initial year devoted to classical studies, he spent two years studying with Franz Delitzsch, foremost Hebraist of the day, and psychologists Wilhelm Wundt and Gustav Theodor Fechner. In his autobiography, Worcester recalled that the liberal German academic tradition, which "tends to weaken and remove the false opposition which has grown up between the things of the mind and the things of the Spirit," was the inspiration for much of his later work.

After his ordination in 1891, Worcester became chaplain and professor of psychology and philosophy at Lehigh University in Bethlehem, Pennsylvania. His indecision between academic and parish work was resolved by a call to a historic parish in Philadelphia, St. Stephen's. One of his parishioners at St. Stephens was noted neurologist S. Weir Mitchell, who became a close friend and a source of guidance in the application of depth psychology to ministry. After 8 years Worcester moved on to Emmanuel Church in Boston. The next year he was joined by Samuel McComb as associate rector. McComb (1864–1938) was raised in Belfast, Ireland and educated at Oxford. He had been a professor of church history at Queen's University in Ontario and served as minister of Presbyterian churches in England and New York City, before being ordained in the Episcopal Church. A popular speaker and an excellent writer, he became the primary spokesman for the movement during its active years.

== Medical background: Cabot, Pratt, Putnam and Coriat ==
Boston was the center of a local "medical psychotherapy" tradition going back to the 1890s when William James, Josiah Royce, Hugo Munsterberg and Boris Sidis developed individualized techniques for the relief of mental distress. The psychiatric professionals of the 19th century, alienists and neurologists, were primarily concerned with severe pathology such as schizophrenia and mania. Little attention was paid to milder mental conditions. The New England psychopathologists, in contrast, dealt with the problems of those who were more or less functional but unhappy. They treated patients with anxiety or depression or in the grip of compulsive behaviors. James Jackson Putnam (1846–1918), Harvard's first professor of diseases of the nervous system and a founder of the American Psychoanalytic Association, was influenced by this tradition of eclectic therapy. He saw the Emmanuel movement, with its synthesis of psychology and "moral" treatment, as a positive development. His support was important in the reception of the movement by the orthodox medical community.

Dr. Richard C. Cabot, in 1905, concluded that he didn’t have enough information to make exact diagnoses of his patients at the Massachusetts General Hospital clinics. He didn’t know where they lived or worked, what they worried about or ate for dinner. He believed it was important to understand his patients’ economic situation, what toxins they may have been exposed to and how they were handling the stress of daily life. With his own money, he hired a nurse, Garnet Isabel Pelton (November 25, 1868 - June 15, 1925), to serve as Mass General’s first social worker. Then, in 1907, Dr. Cabot hired Ida Maud Cannon (June 29, 1877 - July 7, 1960), who later held the title of Chief of Social Service (1914-1945) at the hospital. Together, Cabot and Cannon led the development and growth of the first social services department in a hospital in the United States. Cabot became chief of medicine at Massachusetts General Hospital from 1912 until his retirement, was an innovator in both medical education and psychosocial medicine. He introduced the first weekly "Grand Rounds," now traditional in teaching hospitals. Cabot wrote popular books on counseling, ethics and religion which reflected his continuing loyalty to the philosophy he had learned under Josiah Royce.

Dr. Joseph Pratt (1872–1956) received his degree in medicine (1898) from Johns Hopkins University School of Medicine, where he studied under William H. Welch and Sir William Osler. He joined Cabot's tuberculosis clinic at Massachusetts General Hospital in 1903. From 1927 he served as chief of medicine at the Boston Dispensary and professor at Tufts University School of Medicine. The Pratt Diagnostic Clinic at Tufts Medical Center is named in his honor. Although tuberculosis was then endemic in urban areas, treatments in vogue were labor-intensive and available mainly to the affluent. If there was any hope of offering this sort of care to the poor, Dr. Pratt realized that working with groups of patients and care-givers would be necessary. He also had a lifelong interest in the influence of psychosocial factors on physical and mental illness, so he had confidence in the value of integrated support systems.

Dr. Isador Coriat (1875–1943) was a Tufts neurologist/psychopathologist whose major professional influence was Morton Prince. Unlike most of his medical colleagues, Coriat was the son of Jewish immigrants of limited means. He had entered medical school directly from the public school system and began his medical career at Worcester State Hospital under Dr. Adolf Meyer. As a member of the first generation of American psychoanalysts, he was a link between 19th century experimental psychology and 20th century dynamic psychiatry.

== Early projects ==
In 1905, Dr. Pratt asked Elwood Worcester if Emmanuel Church could offer any support for a project to improve the care of tuberculosis patients living in the poorest sections of Boston. Dr. Pratt hoped to encourage rest, optimal nutrition and fresh air (the primary treatments then used in tuberculosis sanatoria) through classes and home visits. Emmanuel Church provided both meeting space and the entire funding of the project, but there was no clergy involvement or religious component.

Encouraged by the success of the tuberculosis class, Worcester consulted local neurologists about the possibility of similar work among the "nervously and morally diseased." He assured them that he was not attempting to establish any new doctrine, but only to give each patient the best opportunity possible for health and well-being. The response was positive. Dr. James Putnam presided over the first meeting to plan the new project. Cabot and Coriat served as speakers and medical advisors.

These preliminary meetings developed into the "Weekly Health Conference." Each meeting began with hymns and prayers, and included a lecture by a medical doctor or member of the clergy. The techniques of suggestion and auto-suggestion were a strong component of their psychology, but the approach was eclectic. Spiritual lectures often reflected New Thought influence. The formal program was followed by an hour of fellowship, at which there was only one rule: no mention of disease was allowed.

In 1908 a fire destroyed much of the town of Chelsea. Worcester, McComb and members of the church moved quickly to assist those left homeless. They rented one of the few homes left standing and turned it into the "Emmanuel Relief Station", offering food and clothing. Next they arranged for the help of doctors in treating burns and wounds, and provided instruments and supplies. The house was also used for the care of women during and after childbirth (at the time most babies were delivered at home, at least among the poor). After the relief station closed, the parish expanded the care offered at their primary location to include some medical services.

With the expansion of the Social Services Department, the church needed a full-time worker to supervise the projects. Courtenay F. Baylor (November 3, 1870 - May 30, 1947), a former insurance salesman who had come to Elwood Worcester for help with his own problems a few years earlier, was hired in 1912. His role grew over time to that of a lay psychotherapist.

== Years of growth ==
Ladies Home Journal published a series of articles written by Elwood Worcester in 1908-9 introducing his ideas to a national audience. The first book about the movement, Religion and Medicine, The Moral Control of Nervous Disorders by Worcester, McComb and Isador Coriat, appeared in 1908. The book went through nine printings in its first year of publication as the popularity of the movement grew.

Four components made up the primary approach to therapy. The church continued to offer large lectures and classes, primarily devoted to what would now be termed "functional" illness (Worcester and McComb did not claim that they could cure organic disease). There was a clinic, held under the auspices of the church and staffed by physicians, which offered some traditional medical care. The third component, unique at the time, offered the services of "lay therapists" who were trained on the job by Worcester, McComb and others. Treatment consisted of a relatively brief form of analysis, support and direction for making changes in the patient's life, and the use of suggestion to relieve symptoms. Therapy was reinforced by volunteers who visited the patients at home.

== Notoriety and opposition ==
Publicity brought criticism, particularly from conservative physicians. Cabot, Coriat, and Pratt, however, remained loyal despite the onslaught. Putnam, who had been an early sponsor, withdrew his support in 1907 due to concerns that medical supervision was inadequate. Worcester took steps to increase the role of doctors in response to the criticism. He also reduced his contact with the media, as the notoriety was an annoyance to some of his parishioners.

Clarence B. Farrar (1874-1970), a Maryland psychiatrist, compared the movement to Christian Science. "Just now," he wrote, "while the mother science of Mrs. Eddy, synchronously with the patent medicine fraternity, has been getting into somewhat ill odor throughout the states, a Son of the Blood arises in the person of the Reverend Elwood Worcester, of Boston, and from the land of witchcraft and transcendentalism we receive a new gospel." The physicians supporting the movement, he claimed, were "willing to sell their birthright and to surrender a part of their legitimate province, to hand over impotently to the clergy for treatment, certain conditions which are just as truly the manifestations of disease or trauma as would be a broken limb or febrile delirium."

Sigmund Freud made his only visit to the United States in 1909, at the height of the media coverage of the Emmanuel movement. In an interview with a reporter for the Boston Evening Transcript on September 11, 1909, Freud admitted that he knew very little about the movement but said that "this undertaking of a few men without medical, or with very superficial medical training, seems to me at the very least of questionable good."

== Later years ==
Samuel McComb left Emmanuel Church in 1916 to become dean of the Cathedral of the Incarnation in Baltimore, Maryland. He returned to the Boston area a few years later to teach at Episcopal Theological School in Cambridge, then moved to France to become rector of the American Episcopal Church in Nice. Elwood Worcester had little time to devote to work with individuals while serving as rector, but continued to supervise Courtenay Baylor and other lay therapists who trained at Emmanuel. In 1931, Worcester retired from Emmanuel Church. Courtenay Baylor arranged for the use of a house in Boston, and the two incorporated as the Craigie Foundation in order to continue their counseling work.

Body, Mind and Spirit, by Elwood Worcester and Samuel McComb, was published in 1931. In the book's introduction, Worcester reflected on "the remedial ministry undertaken by my associates and by me in Emmanuel Church, Boston." They had begun in a time when the pre-Freudian methods of psychotherapeutic work dominated the field, and later incorporated, in a limited way, some of the methods of psychoanalysis. They had "prepared hundreds of patients for surgical operations . . . had been able to remove pain and to obtain natural sleep. . . I am thinking primarily, however, of alcoholism and of other drug addictions. It is well known that we have obtained as good and as permanent results in these fields as any other workers, and these results have been obtained by suggestion and by the inculcation of new and more spiritual principles."

== Influence ==
Ernest Jacoby (November 6, 1880 - 1934), a Boston rubber merchant and Emmanuel parishioner, began weekly meetings for men with alcohol problems in 1909. Later the group was advertised as the Jacoby Club, "A Club for Men to Help Themselves by Helping Others." In a 1910 church newsletter Elwood Worcester wrote that it was not "an ordinary temperance society," that the goal was "to see that careful scientific treatment by qualified physicians and clergymen is administered to those who need it." Primarily, however, the group was devoted to mutual help. The Jacoby Club remained active through the 1920s and 30s, and in its declining years provided space for the earliest Boston meetings of Alcoholics Anonymous.

Courtenay Baylor became well known as an expert on alcoholism, publishing a description of his methods in 1919. One of the recovering alcoholics who attended his classes in 1921-22 was Richard R. Peabody, a descendant of a wealthy and influential Boston family. Peabody trained as a lay therapist under Baylor's direction and then set up his own practice, first in Boston and then in New York City. His 1931 book, The Common Sense of Drinking, was dedicated to Baylor and became a classic in the field of alcoholism treatment.

== See also ==
- Émile Coué
- Hypnotic Ego-Strengthening Procedure
