= Peabody (surname) =

Peabody is a surname, and may refer to:

- Arthur Peabody (1858–1942), Campus architect for the University of Wisconsin from 1905 to 1915 and the state architect of Wisconsin from 1915 to 1938.
- Cecil H. Peabody (1855-1934), American mechanical engineer and professor.
- Charles S. Peabody (1880–1935), American architect. Partner of Ludlow and Peabody.
- Dave Peabody (born 1948), English singer-songwriter, blues and folk musician, record producer and photographer
- Dwight Peabody (1894–1972), American football player
- Elizabeth Peabody (1804–1894), American educator
- Endicott Peabody (educator) (1857–1944), American Episcopal priest and founder of the Groton School for Boys
  - Malcolm Endicott Peabody (1888–1974), reverend, son of Endicott Peabody
  - Mary E. Peabody (1891–1981), civil-rights and anti-war activist in the 1960s, married to Malcolm Endicott Peabody.
    - Marietta Endicott Peabody (1917–1991) socialite and political reporter, daughter of Malcolm Endicott Peabody and Mary Elizabeth Peabody.
    - Endicott Peabody (1920–1997), American politician, governor of Massachusetts (1963–1965), son of Malcolm Endicott Peabody and Mary Elizabeth Peabody.
- Francis Greenwood Peabody (1847–1936), American minister and Harvard professor
- Frank Elmer Peabody (1914–1958), American paleontologist
- F. H. Peabody (fl. 1870s), American former vice-president (1874–1877) and director (1870–1879) of the Atchison, Topeka and Santa Fe Railway company (1874–1877), the city of Peabody, Kansas is named in his honor
- Francis S. Peabody (1858–1922), American businessman, founder of Peabody Energy as Peabody Coal in 1883
- Francis Weld Peabody (1881-1927), American physician
- Fanny Peabody Mason (1864–1948), American heiress, philanthropist
- George Peabody (1795–1869), American entrepreneur, London-based banker and philanthropist who founded the Peabody Institute, Museums, and Trust
- George Foster Peabody (1852–1938), American Southern banker and philanthropist for whom the Peabody Award is named
- Herbert E. Peabody (died 1930), American businessman
- James Hamilton Peabody (1852–1917), American politician, twice governor of Colorado (1903-1905 & 1905)
- Joseph Peabody (1757–1844), American shipowner and merchant of Salem, Massachusetts
  - Catherine Endicott Peabody (1837–1898), American art patron, wife of John Lowell Gardner II and daughter of Joseph Peabody
- Lucy Whitehead McGill Waterbury Peabody (1861–1949), American Baptist missionary
- Nathaniel Peabody (1741–1823), American physician, Continental Congressman, state representative, and senator for New Hampshire
- Nathaniel Peabody (Boston) (1774–1855), American Boston Brahmin, father of Elizabeth Palmer, Mary Tyler, Sophia Amelia
- Raymond A. Peabody (1883–1973), American politician
- Richard R. Peabody (1892–1936), American author of The Common Sense of Drinking, a major influence on Alcoholics Anonymous founder Bill Wilson
- Sophia Peabody Hawthorne (1809–1871), American painter and illustrator, wife of author Nathaniel Hawthorne

== Fictional ==
- Amelia Peabody, Character in a series of Victorian mystery novels by Elizabeth Peters
- Helena Peabody, Character on The L Word TV series
- Jeremiah Peabody, character who makes green and purple pills in song
- Josiah Peabody, Character in the novel The Captain from Connecticut (1941) by C. S. Forester
- Mister Peabody, Character on "The Rocky and Bullwinkle Show," genius dog accompanied by "his boy" Sherman.
- Professor Peabody (Jocelyn Mabel Peabody), Female character in the Dan Dare comic series
- Mr Peabody, A character in The Mr Peabody & Sherman Show
- Delia Peabody, a character in the In-Death series by J.D. Robb.

== See also ==
- Peabody (disambiguation)
