= Constantin Brâncuși =

Romanian sculptor, photographer and painter (1876–1957)

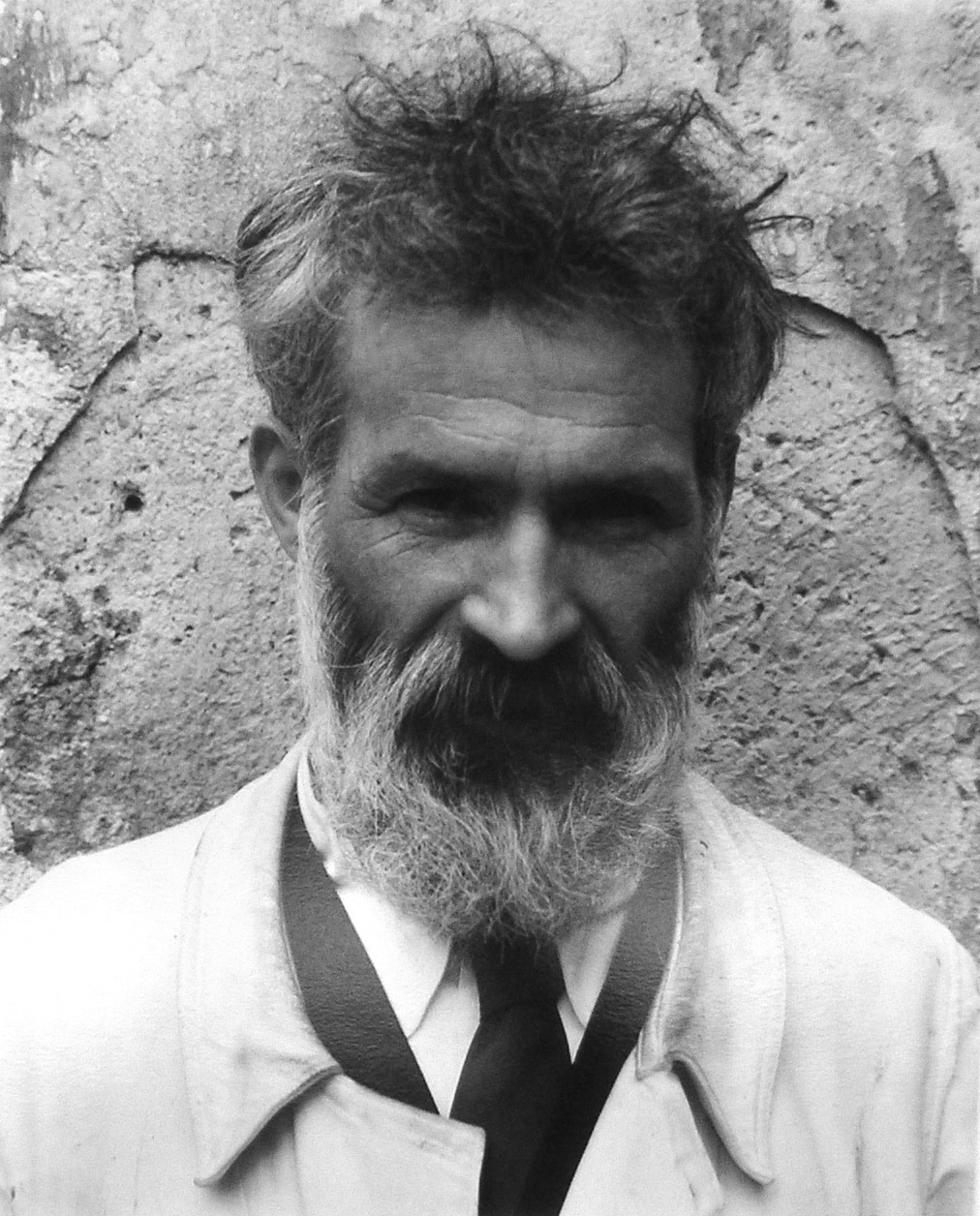
- Photograph by Edward Steichen, 1922
- Born: February 19, 1876; Hobița, Romanian United Principalities
- Died: March 16, 1957 (aged 81); Paris, France
- Resting place: Cimetière du Montparnasse, Paris
- Education: École des Beaux-Arts
- Known for: Sculpture
- Notable work: The Endless Column (1938); Bird in Space (1919); Torso of a Young Man (1917 –22); The Newborn (1915); Mademoiselle Pogany (1912); Prometheus (1911); Sleeping Muse (1910); The Kiss (1908)
- Movement: Modernism, School of Paris
- Awards: Election to Romanian Academy
- Patrons: John Quinn

Constantin Brâncuși (Romanian: [konstanˈtin brɨŋˈkuʃʲ]; February 19, 1876 – March 16, 1957) was a Romanian sculptor, painter, and photographer. Considered one of the most influential sculptors of the 20th century and a pioneer of modernism, Brâncuși is called the patriarch of modern sculpture. As a child, he displayed an aptitude for carving wooden farm tools. Formal studies took him first to Bucharest, then to Munich, then to the École des Beaux-Arts in Paris from 1905 to 1907. His art emphasizes clean geometrical lines that balance forms inherent in his materials with the symbolic allusions of representational art. Brâncuși's practice drew from Romanian folk art, and sought a great deal of inspiration in non-European cultures as a source of primitive exoticism, as did Paul Gauguin, Pablo Picasso, André Derain, and others.

== Biography ==
=== Childhood and education in Romania ===
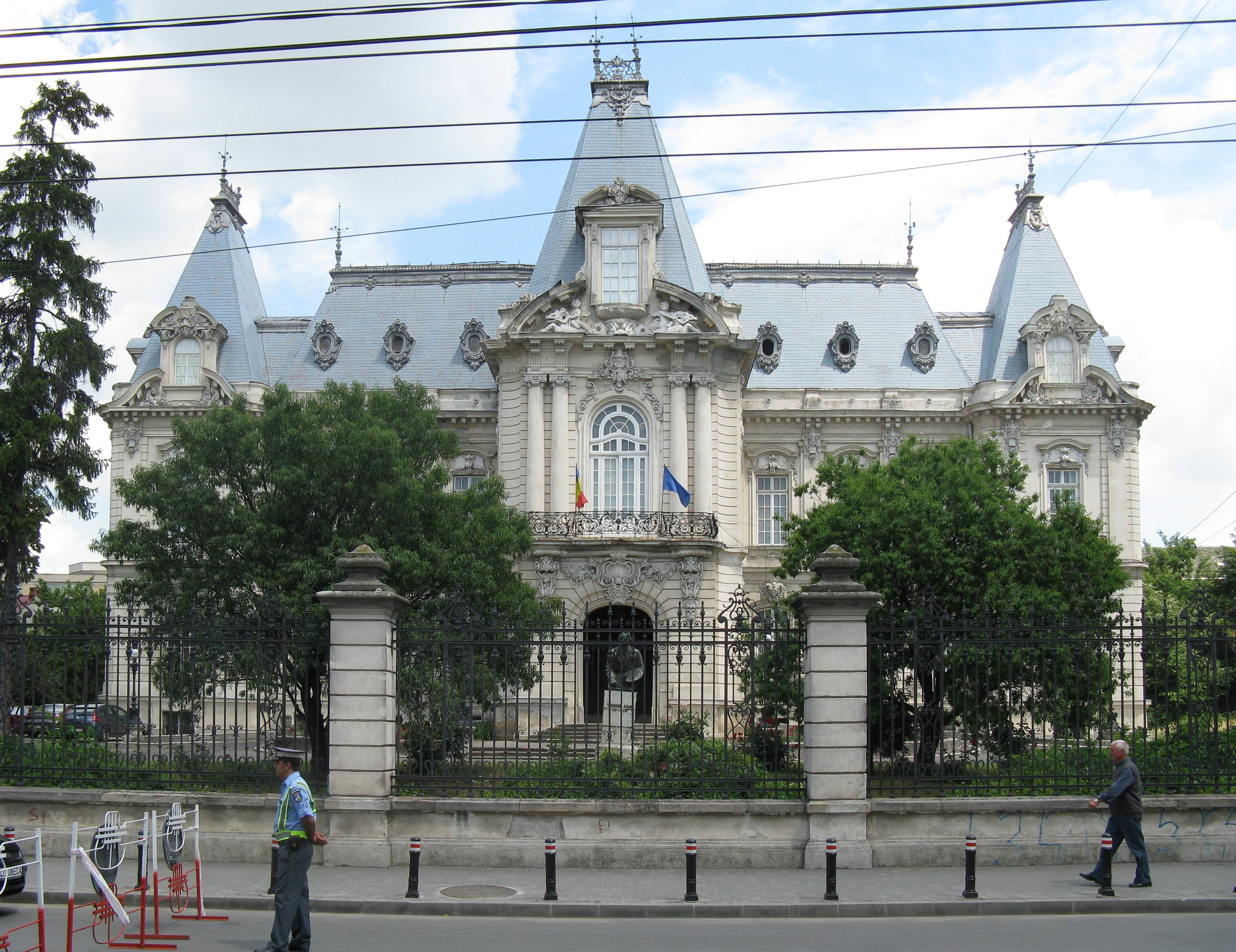
The Craiova Art Museum, which holds works by Brâncuși

Constantin Brâncuși was born on February 19, 1876, in the village of Hobița, in Gorj County. His parents were Nicolae Radu and Maria Brâncuși. The family supported itself through farming, raising livestock, and woodworking skills passed down through generations.

He attended primary school in Peștișani from 1884 to 1887. At the age of eleven, he left his family home and went to Târgu Jiu. For a few months, he worked for a dyer named Moscu, who taught him to prepare vegetable dyes and color wool for carpets. He later worked at a café. After spending some time with his half-brother Ion, who ran an inn in Peștișani, Brâncuși moved to Craiova in 1889. He worked in a warehouse and found employment at a grocery store in Slatina in September 1892.

In Craiova, his skill with wood drew attention. At eighteen, he made a violin from materials he found at his workplace. In 1894, he entered the Craiova School of Arts and Crafts. He studied drawing, modeling, woodcarving, and cabinetmaking, completing the course in 1898.

That year, he entered the National School of Fine Arts in Bucharest. For the entrance examination, he made a charcoal drawing of a plaster reproduction of Laocoön and His Sons, which he studied again in clay and plaster in 1900. His training included anatomy lessons with the physician Dimitrie Gerota. The Écorché, completed under Gerota's direction, shows a man without skin, exposing the musculature. The work was exhibited at the Romanian Athenaeum in 1903.

Brâncuși received his diploma in 1902. He completed a year of military service and continued working in the school's studio. In 1903, he was commissioned to make a monument to the physician and general Carol Davila. He modeled the bust in plaster. It was cast in bronze and installed in front of the Military Hospital in Bucharest. The work retained the academic portrait style of his student years.

Later in 1903, he left Bucharest for Western Europe. He walked much of the journey and worked along the way to support himself. He passed through Vienna, Munich, and Basel, where he stayed for a time, and arrived in Paris on July 14, 1904.

=== Study in Paris and break with Rodin ===
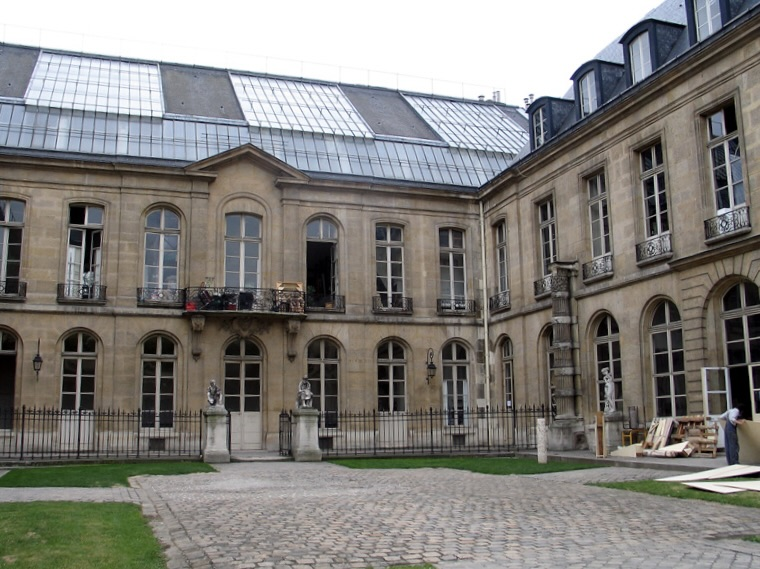
The École nationale supérieure des beaux-arts in Paris

During his first months in Paris, Brâncuși worked as a dishwasher at the Brasserie Chartier. When money was scarce, he assisted at services in the Romanian Orthodox church on rue Jean-de-Beauvais. In June 1905, he passed the entrance examination for the École des Beaux-Arts, where he studied in the sculpture class of Antonin Mercié. He received an annual scholarship from the Romanian Ministry of Education from 1905 to 1908.

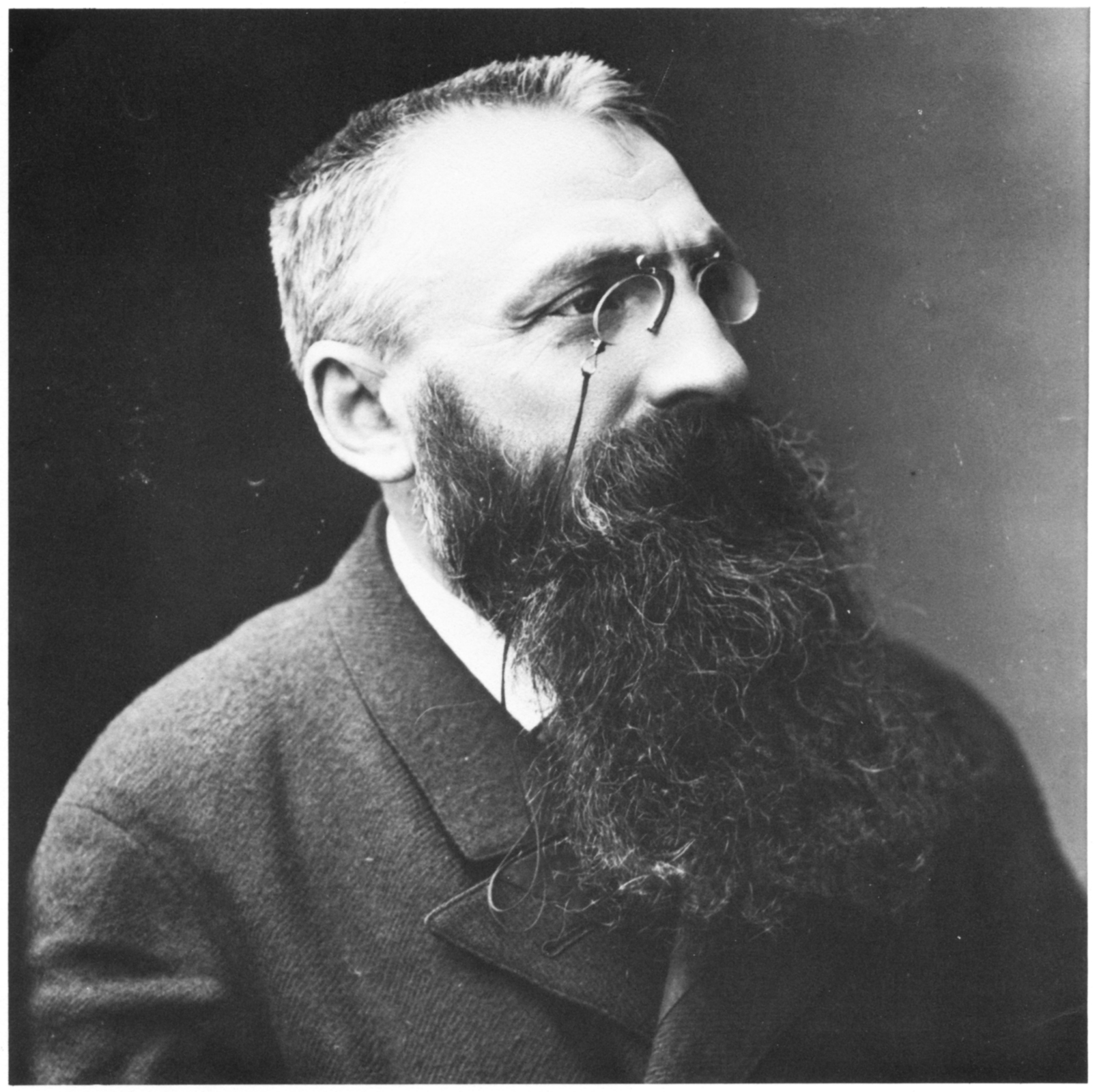
Auguste Rodin in 1893, photographed by Nadar

In 1906, he exhibited for the first time at the salon of the Société Nationale des Beaux-Arts and at the Salon d'Automne. His works included the plaster sculptures L'Enfant and L'Orgueil. At the following salon of the Société Nationale, he exhibited Le Supplice, a portrait of Nicolae Dărăscu, and two heads of children.

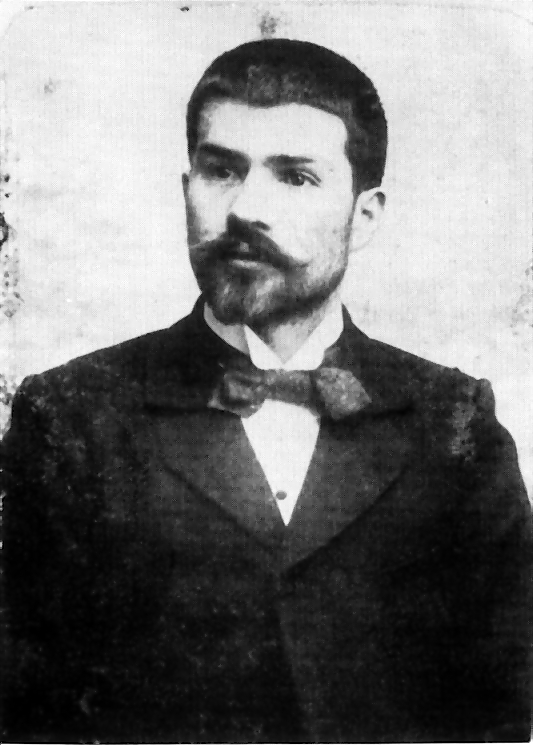
Brâncuși, c. 1905

In March 1907, Brâncuși began working as an assistant to Auguste Rodin. He remained in Rodin's studio for only a few weeks. He preferred to find his own path and summed up the decision with the words, "Nothing grows in the shade of large trees."

Soon afterward, he received a commission for a funerary monument to Petre Stănescu at Dumbrava Cemetery in Buzău. The design joined a bust of Stănescu with the kneeling figure The Prayer. The size of the sculptures required a ground-floor workspace. In March 1908, Brâncuși rented a studio at 54 rue du Montparnasse, near the painter and photographer Edward Steichen. He remained there until 1916.

Between 1908 and 1910, Baroness Renée Frachon posed for Brâncuși. The sittings led to La Baronne R.F. and the first forms of Sleeping Muse. He reduced the face to a few lines on a reclining, ovoid head.

Brâncuși also moved away from modeling works in clay or plaster for casting. He began carving stone and wood directly, although he continued to make plaster and bronze versions. The methods he had learned in Romania remained present in his handling of tools and his sustained contact with the material.

=== Studios, friendships, and portraits ===
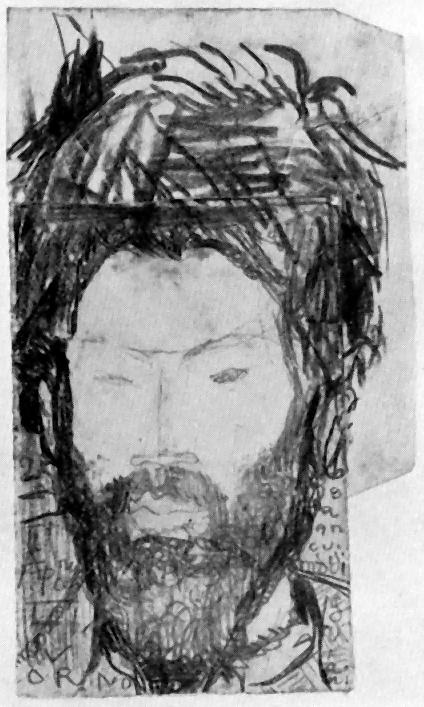
Amedeo Modigliani, Portrait of Constantin Brâncuși, c. 1909

From 1908, Brâncuși spent time with artists and writers working in Paris, including Amedeo Modigliani, Fernand Léger, Marcel Duchamp, Henri Rousseau, Guillaume Apollinaire, Alexander Archipenko, and Henri Matisse. He met Modigliani in 1909 through the collector Paul Alexandre. The Italian artist drew his portrait in black and red pencil that year.

He remained in contact with Romanian artists, musicians, and writers living in France, among them George Enescu, Theodor Pallady, Camil Ressu, Nicolae Dărăscu, Benjamin Fondane, Panait Istrati, Traian Vuia, Eugène Ionesco, and Emil Cioran. He spoke Romanian in his studio, welcomed visitors from Romania, and followed news from the country.

In 1910, he met the Hungarian painter Margit Pogány, who was studying in Paris. She sat for him in 1910 and 1911. After she returned to Hungary, Brâncuși carved the first marble version of Mademoiselle Pogany from memory, completing it in 1912. They remained friends and corresponded for decades.

A version of The Kiss, carved in 1909, was installed in 1911 on the grave of Tatiana Rachewskaia at Montparnasse Cemetery.

In May 1912, Brâncuși rented a second studio at 47 rue du Montparnasse, across from the first. That fall, he visited an aviation exhibition at the Grand Palais with Duchamp and Léger. The three stopped before an airplane propeller. Its mechanical precision led them into a conversation about machine-made forms and the direction sculpture might take.

Brâncuși attended dinners centered on Apollinaire and meetings of artists in the Puteaux Group. He also went to gatherings led by the poet Paul Fort at the Closerie des Lilas, where he met Léger, Blaise Cendrars, Jean Cocteau, Erik Satie, and other musicians and writers.

=== Armory Show and 291 ===
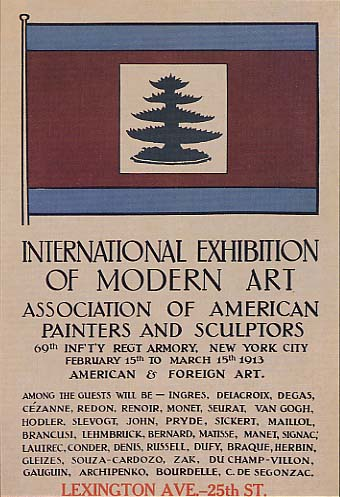
Poster for the 1913 Armory Show

In December 1912, Arthur Bowen Davies, Walt Kuhn, and Walter Pach visited Paris in search of works for the Armory Show. The exhibition catalog listed five sculptures by Brâncuși: The Kiss, Sleeping Muse, A Muse, Mademoiselle Pogany, and Torso.

The exhibition opened in New York on February 17, 1913, traveled to Chicago, and ended in Boston. Brâncuși's compact forms provoked laughter, caricatures, and arguments in the press. Commentators who did not recognize Mademoiselle Pogany as a conventional portrait compared it to an egg.

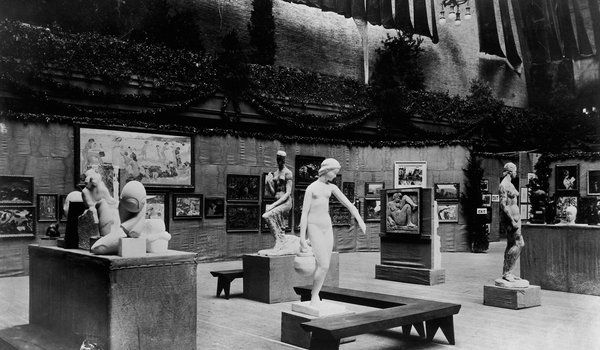
Interior of the Armory Show in New York, 1913. Brâncuși's Mademoiselle Pogany is at left

Edward Steichen selected the works for Brâncuși's first solo exhibition in the United States. Titled An Exhibition of Original Sculpture, in Bronze, Marble, and Wood, by Constantin Brancusi, of Paris, it brought eight sculptures to 291, the gallery operated by Alfred Stieglitz, from March 12 to April 4, 1914. The works included Măiastra and Mademoiselle Pogany. Agnes and Eugene Meyer paid for their transportation and began buying works directly from Brâncuși.

The lawyer and collector John Quinn, a supporter of the Armory Show, bought works from Brâncuși and remained in contact with him until his death in 1924. In 1914, he acquired a version of Mademoiselle Pogany from 291.

=== World War I and Impasse Ronsin ===
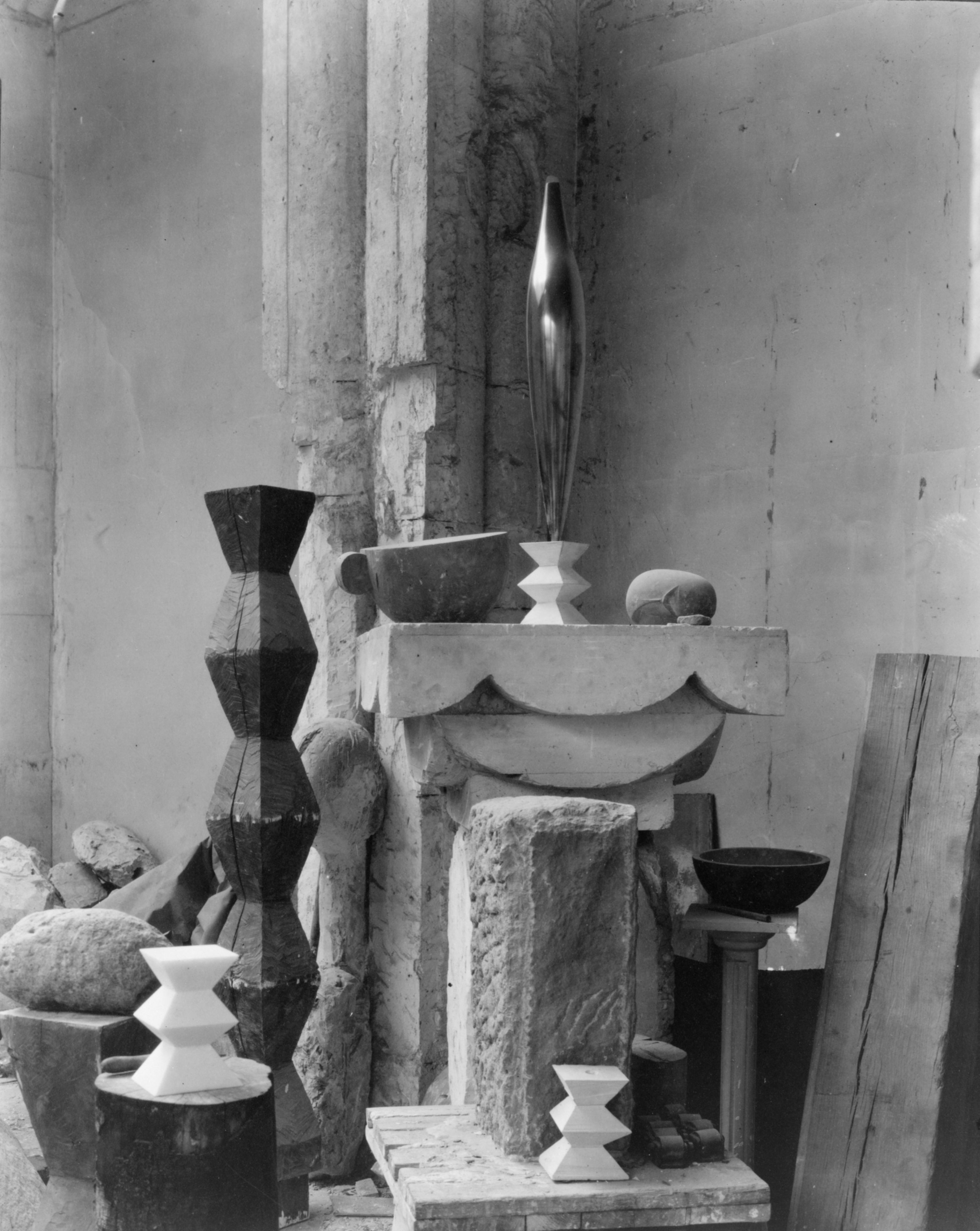
Brâncuși's Paris studio in 1920, photographed by Edward Steichen

Brâncuși remained in Paris after the outbreak of World War I. In 1915, he donated works to an exhibition at Bernheim-Jeune that raised money for Polish artists affected by the war. As a Romanian citizen, he remained liable for military service. He refused to serve in 1916 and received a permanent exemption on November 8, 1917.

In early 1916, he moved into number 8 Impasse Ronsin. He later occupied number 11. He joined two studios and then three by cutting openings through the walls. In 1936 and 1941, he added rooms for unfinished works, his workbench, and his tools.

In 1916, the Modern Gallery, founded by Marius de Zayas, bought Le Nouveau-Né I. The sale widened the group of American collectors following his work. Brâncuși also began photographing his sculptures and testing different arrangements for them inside the studio.

=== Dada, photography, and publications ===
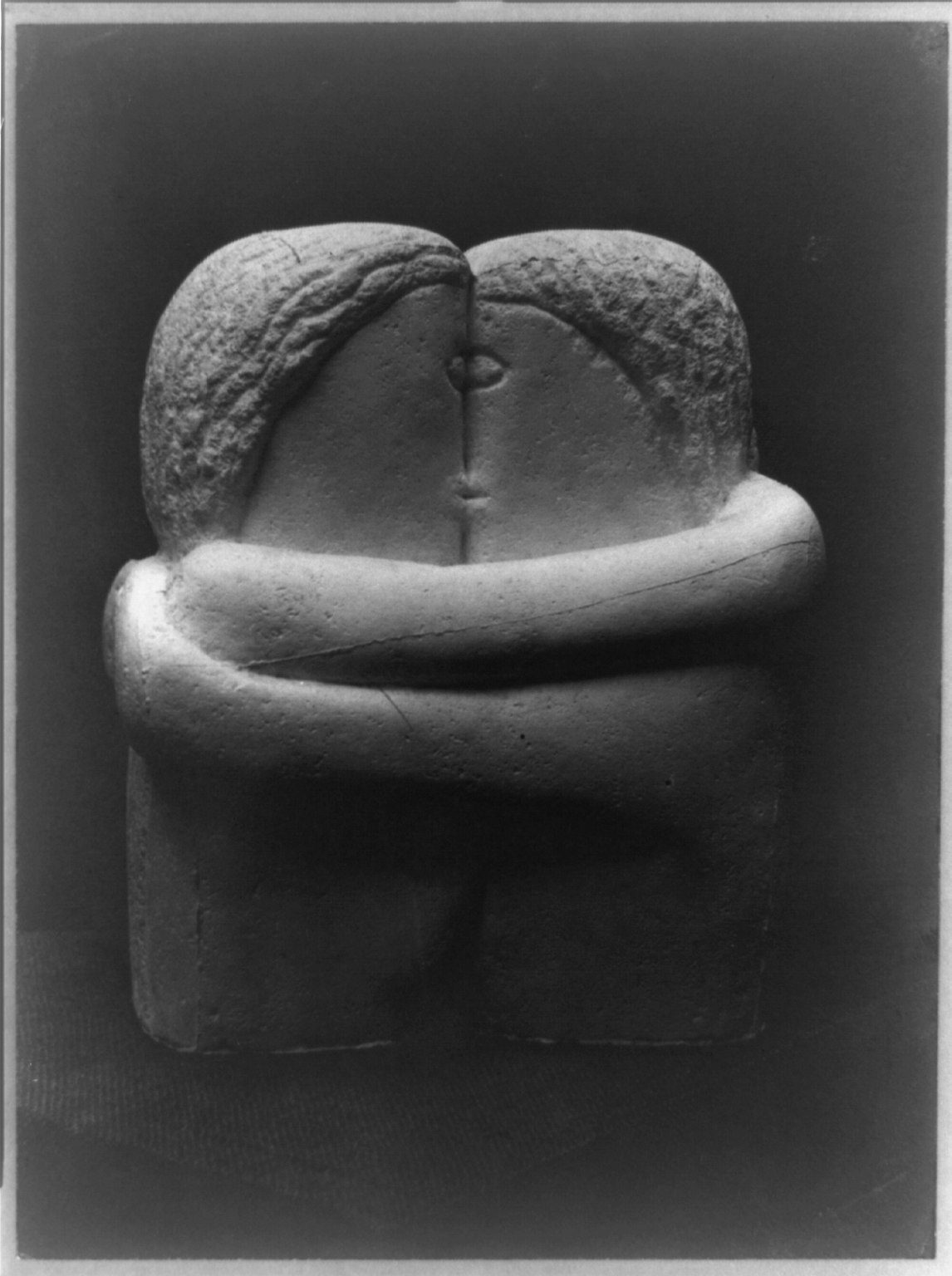
The Kiss Abstract/medium: 1 photographic print. Library of Congress, 1913.

In January 1920, the organizers of the Salon des Indépendants excluded Princess X because they regarded its shape as phallic. Fernand Léger and other friends of Brâncuși protested, and the sculpture was returned to the exhibition. The dispute led to the manifesto Pour l'indépendance de l'art, signed by more than seventy artists and writers.

Brâncuși was friends with Tristan Tzara, Francis Picabia, and Duchamp, but he did not join the Dada movement. He attended its readings and performances. On May 26, 1920, he took part in the Dada festival in Paris and signed the manifesto Contre cubisme, contre dadaïsme with Léger.

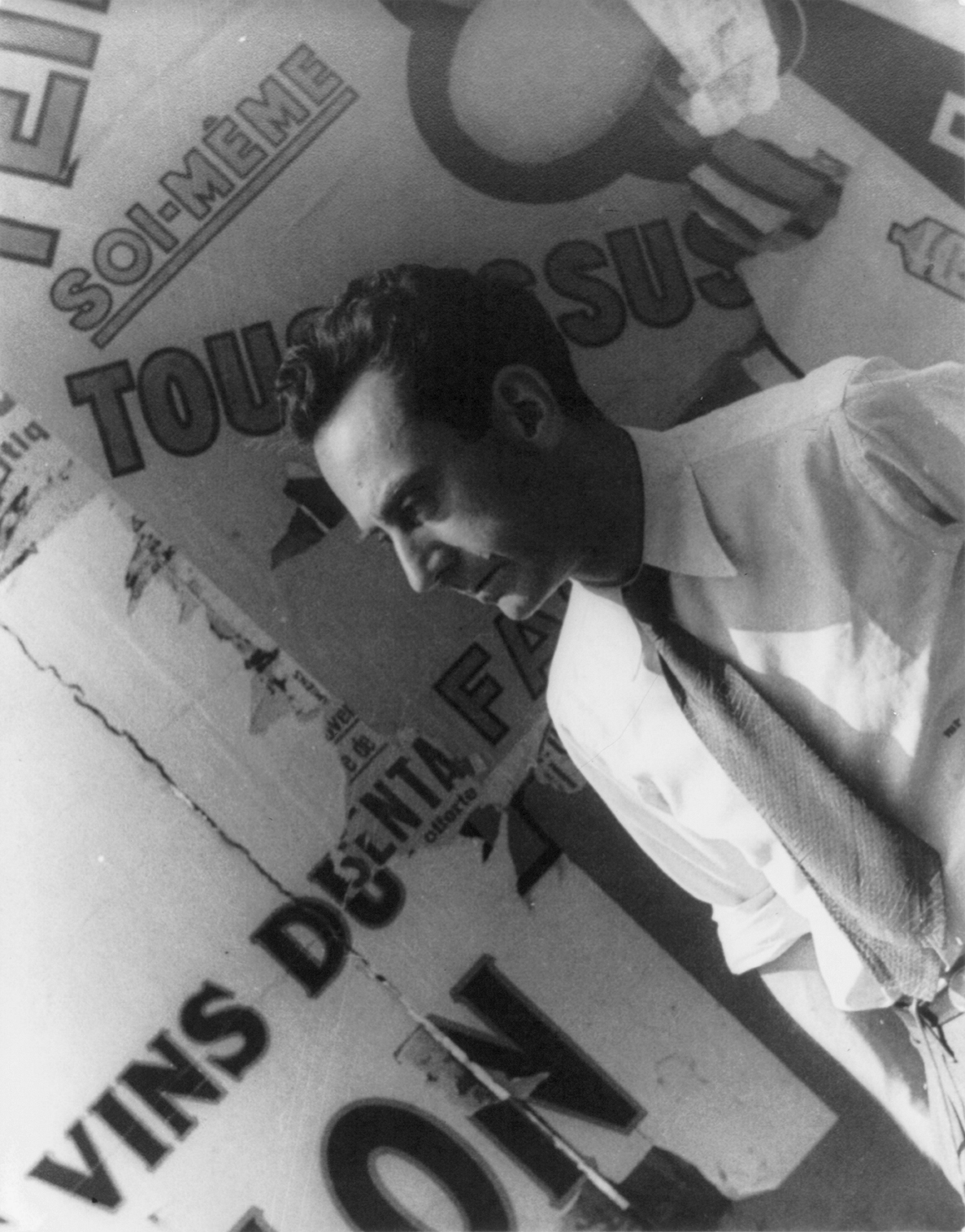
Man Ray, who helped Brâncuși with photographic equipment and methods

Brâncuși had photographed his work since the 1910s. In 1921, he met Man Ray, who helped him buy equipment, set up a darkroom, and improve his developing methods. Brâncuși photographed the sculptures under changing light, altered his framing, and documented the relationships between the works and the surrounding space. He also filmed his studio and sculptures mounted on rotating bases.

In September 1921, the American magazine The Little Review published an issue devoted to Brâncuși. It contained an essay by Ezra Pound and 24 photographic plates showing sculptures and views of the studio.

In 1923, Brâncuși received the Order of the Star of Romania from King Ferdinand I.

In 1925, the Paris magazine This Quarter published photographs, drawings, and aphorisms by Brâncuși. Irène Codreanu selected the images.

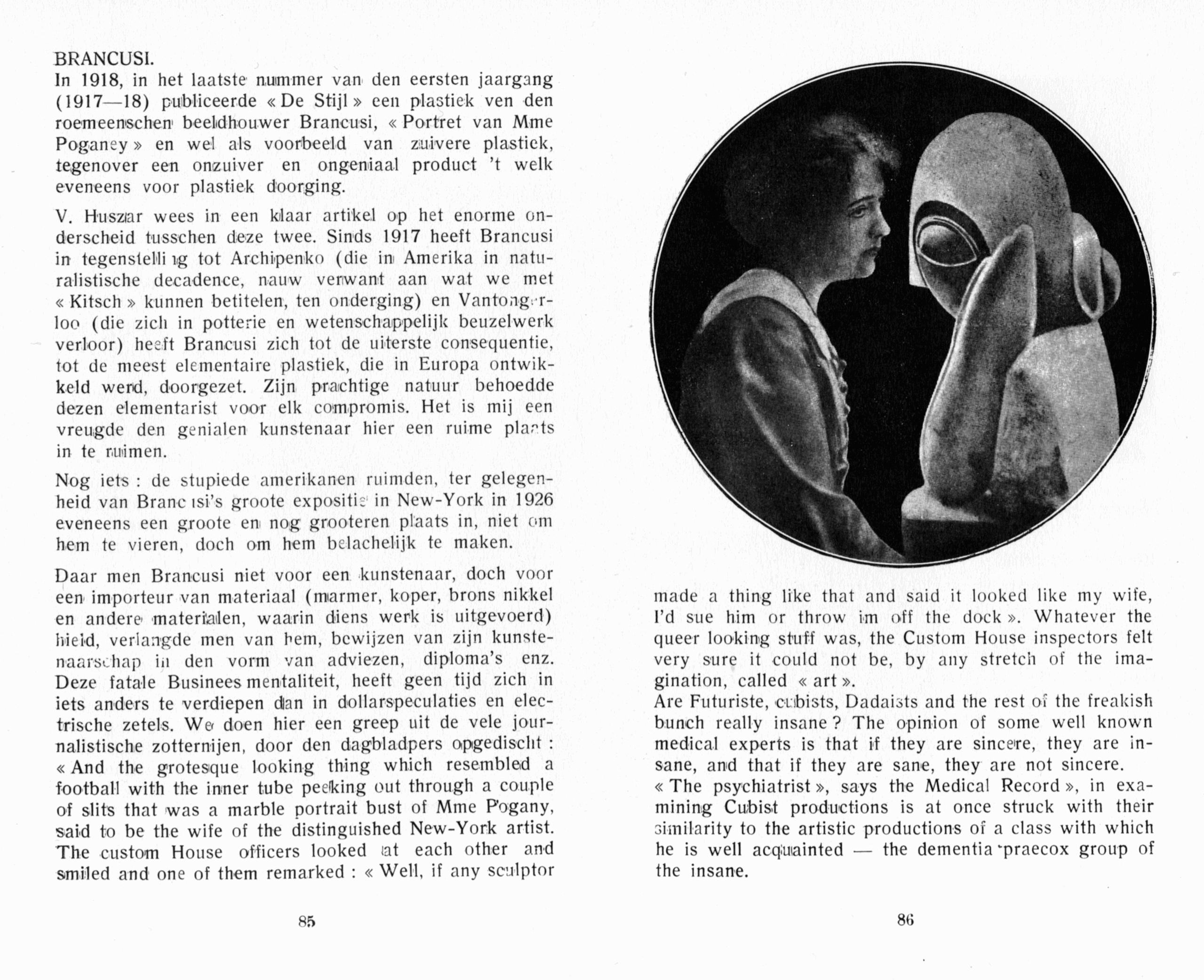
Pages of De Stijl devoted to Brâncuși in 1927, with a photograph of Mademoiselle Pogany beside the sitter

In December 1927, De Stijl published photographs of Princess X, Sculpture for the Blind, and other works by Brâncuși.

=== New York, collectors, and collaborators ===
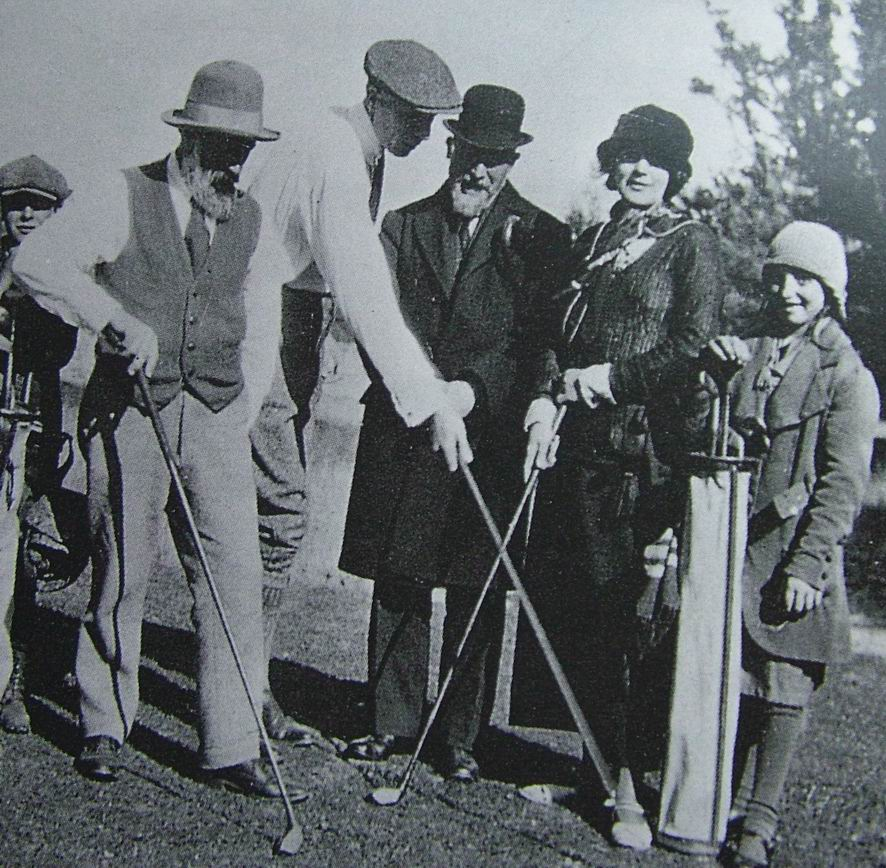
Brâncuși, at left, with Henri-Pierre Roché, Erik Satie, and Jeanne Robert Foster in 1923

In October 1923, John Quinn spent about two weeks in Paris and visited Brâncuși. After Quinn's death, Duchamp and Henri-Pierre Roché bought 29 sculptures from his estate at Brâncuși's request. The sculptor feared that selling all the works at once would lower their prices. Duchamp and Roché offered them gradually to other collectors.

Brâncuși returned to the United States in 1926. The Wildenstein Gallery presented his work in a group exhibition and then in a solo exhibition from February 16 to March 3. Another exhibition opened at the Brummer Gallery on November 17 and remained on view until December 15.

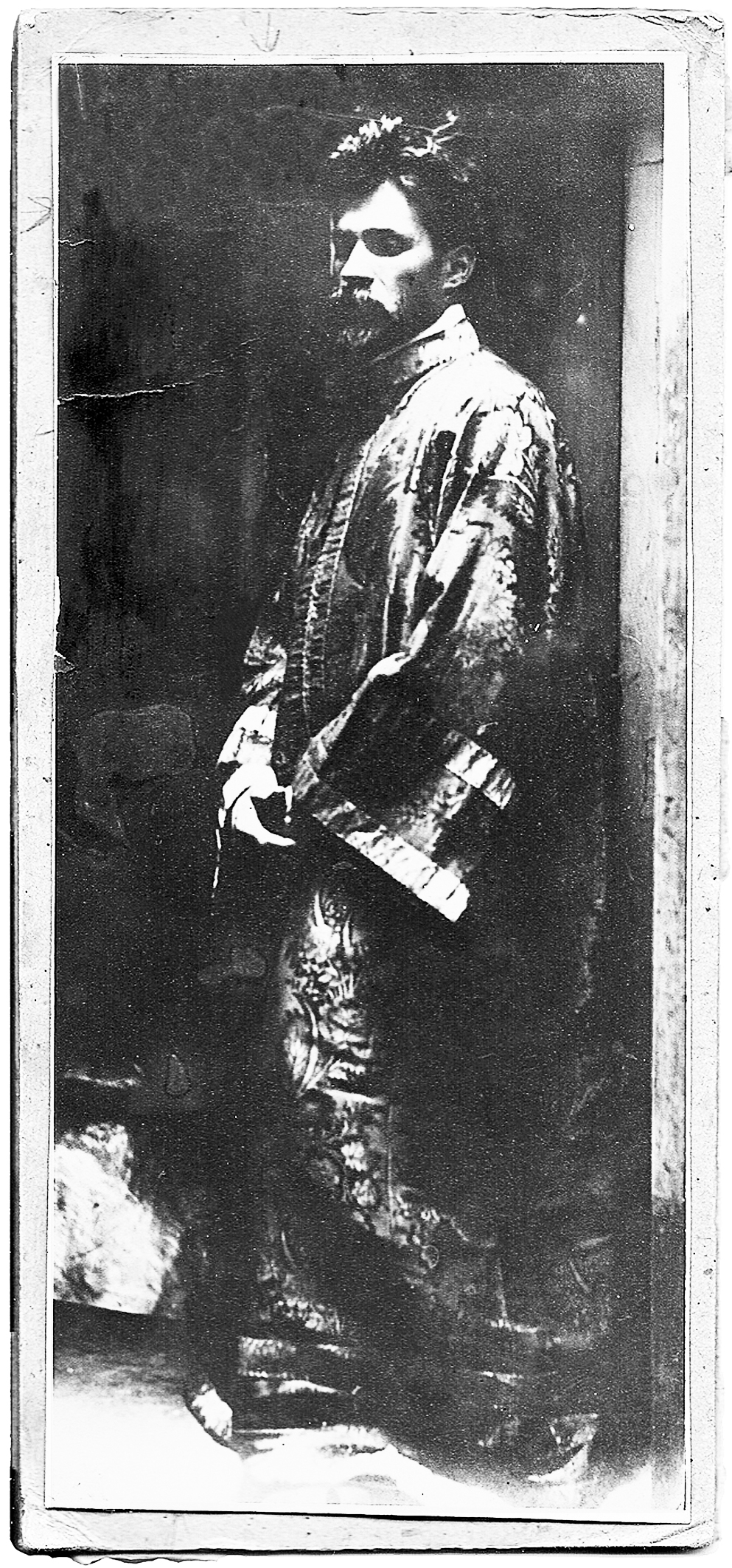
Brâncuși dressed as an Orthodox deacon, c. 1905–1906

During the trip, a bronze version of Bird in Space was detained by United States customs officials. They classified it as an article of metal and imposed the tariff applied to manufactured objects. The case Brancusi v. United States ended in 1928 with the sculpture being accepted as a work of art.

In 1927, the Japanese American sculptor Isamu Noguchi worked as an assistant in Brâncuși's studio. He sawed and polished pieces, prepared the studio, and kept the tools sharp. The experience brought him closer to direct carving in stone and wood.

In 1929, Harry and Caresse Crosby commissioned portraits of James Joyce from Brâncuși for the limited edition of Tales Told of Shem and Shaun, published by the Black Sun Press. Brâncuși made profile and frontal drawings and a composition formed from a spiral and vertical lines. Caresse selected the abstract composition for the frontispiece. The book called it "Portrait of the Author", while Brâncuși used the title "Symbol of James Joyce".

In 1931, Brâncuși met the New Zealand pianist Vera Moore through the collector and curator Jim Ede. They began a relationship, and John Moore was born in 1934. Brâncuși did not legally acknowledge him as his son.

=== Studio, music, and reading ===
Brâncuși dressed simply and furnished his studio with pieces he made himself. A large stone slab served as a table, and the fireplace recalled rural houses in Oltenia. He also made benches, cabinets, doors, and utensils. He cooked his own food and served Romanian dishes to friends.

Brâncuși brought the conception of a work, decisions made in the studio, and physical labor together in a single formula:

"To make art free and universal, you must create like a god, command like a king, and execute like a slave."
Ca arta să fie liberă și universală, trebuie să creezi ca un zeu, să comanzi ca un rege și să execuți ca un sclav.

Music was part of his routine. He played the violin, sang Romanian songs, and built his own phonograph.

His friendship with Erik Satie drew them to the subject of Socrates. Satie had composed the symphonic drama Socrate. Brâncuși gave the same name to a wooden sculpture completed in 1922.

Brâncuși read Plato, Laozi, and works about the Tibetan poet and teacher Milarepa. He kept a copy of Le poète tibétain Milarépa: ses crimes, ses épreuves, son Nirvana, translated into French by Jacques Bacot, near his bed. He compared Milarepa's life in the mountains with his own origins in the Carpathian Mountains.

After settling in Paris, he returned to Romania eight times but never again lived there.

=== Târgu Jiu and the Indore project ===
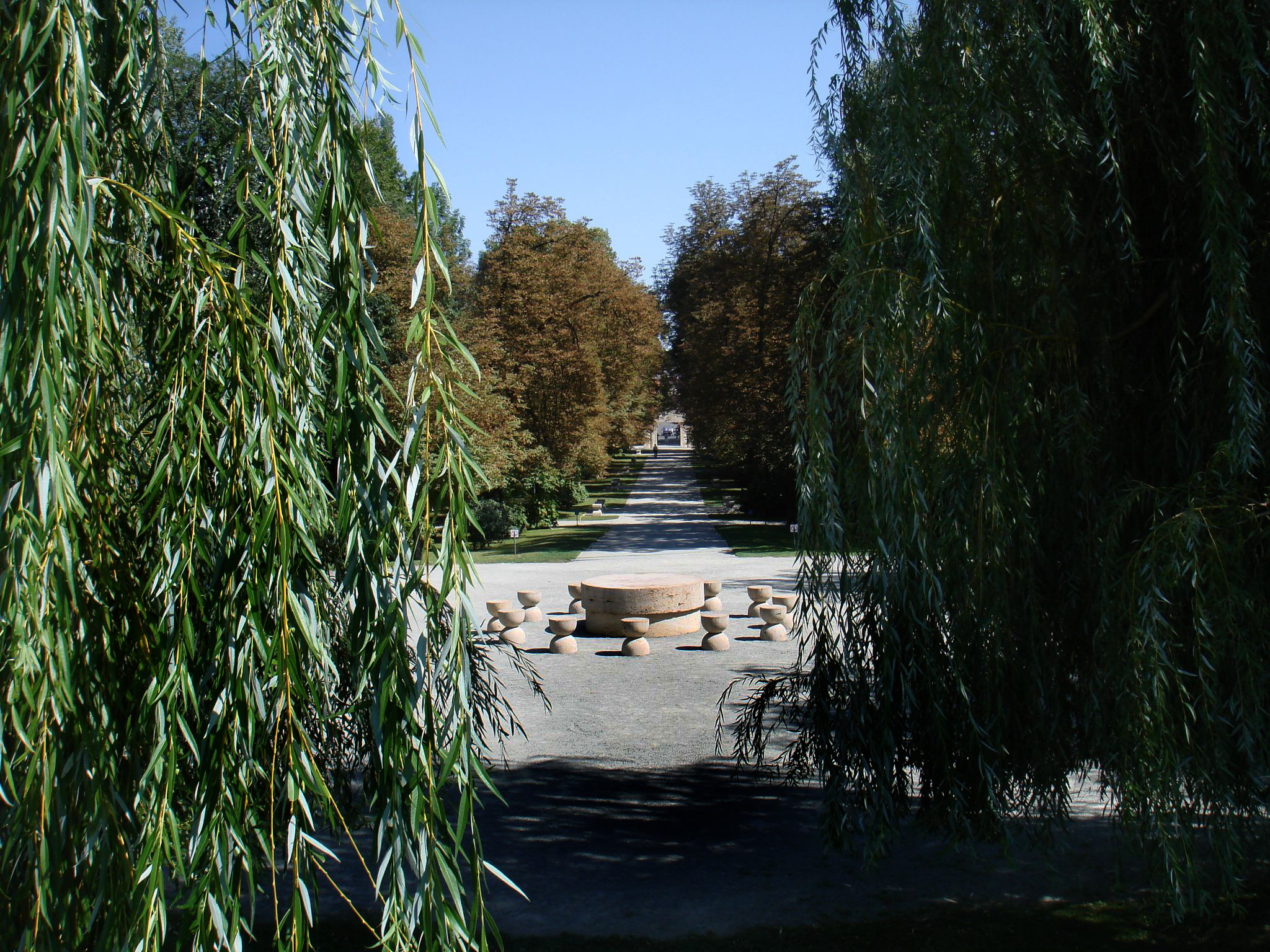
Western end of the Târgu Jiu ensemble, with the Table of Silence and the Gate of the Kiss among the trees

Arethia Tătărescu, president of the National League of Women of Gorj, invited Brâncuși to create a monument to the Romanians killed while defending Târgu Jiu in 1916. He visited the site in June 1937. The first plan called for a tall metal column, a subject he had worked on for nearly two decades. Brâncuși expanded the project and set the works along an axis of about 1.5 km (0.93 mi).

Near the Jiu River, he installed the Table of Silence, the Avenue of Chairs, and the Gate of the Kiss. The Endless Column was raised on a hill at the eastern end of the route. The Church of the Holy Apostles Peter and Paul, which already stood along the path, was incorporated into the axis. Engineer Ștefan Georgescu-Gorjan worked with Brâncuși on the technical construction of the column. The sculptor supervised the installation of the works in 1937 and 1938. The ensemble was inaugurated in October 1938.

During the same period, Yashwant Rao Holkar II, the Maharaja of Indore, asked Brâncuși to design a temple in memory of his first wife. The interior was to contain three versions of Bird in Space, one in bronze, one in black marble, and one in white marble.

Brâncuși traveled to India in early 1938. He passed through Bombay and continued to Indore, where he stayed at the maharaja's palace. He examined the sculptures Holkar had already purchased and studied the proposed site of the temple. The project was never built. On the return journey, he passed through Suez and Cairo, where he visited museums, the Great Sphinx of Giza, and the Giza pyramid complex.

In April 1939, he traveled to New York again. He took part in Art in Our Time, an exhibition organized by the Museum of Modern Art for its tenth anniversary. A version of Le Miracle, also called Le Phoque, was exhibited on a motorized base that slowly rotated the sculpture.

=== World War II and final years ===
Brâncuși remained in Paris during World War II and lived quietly through the years of German occupation. He continued working at Impasse Ronsin. In 1943, he completed La Tortue and a new version of Le Phoque. He set the works on circular bases that allowed their orientation to be changed.

The Romanian painters Natalia Dumitresco and Alexandre Istrati arrived in Paris in 1947 with scholarships from the French government. They met Brâncuși soon afterward and began helping him in the studio. They cared for the works and tools and performed tasks that he was finding increasingly difficult. Brâncuși named them as the heirs to his estate.

In 1950, Walter and Louise Arensberg donated their collection to the Philadelphia Museum of Art. It contained nineteen works by Brâncuși, ten of which had come from John Quinn's estate.

On June 13, 1952, Brâncuși received French citizenship, for which he had applied the previous year.

In January 1955, he fractured the neck of his femur in a fall. He left the hospital in May but walked with difficulty and suffered further falls. In October, the Solomon R. Guggenheim Museum opened the first retrospective of his work in New York. The exhibition later traveled to the Philadelphia Museum of Art.

As his health declined, Brâncuși stopped making new sculptures and concentrated on arranging the works in his studio. When he sold a work, he placed a plaster version in the same position to retain the composition. In 1956, he bequeathed to the French state the sculptures, bases, sketches, photographs, films, furniture, tools, books, and records that remained there. He required the studio to be reconstructed in the arrangement it had at the time of his death.

== Work ==
Brâncuși returned to the same subjects for decades. A head, torso, bird, or column moved from marble to wood or bronze. He changed the scale, polish, and base, giving each version its own proportions and finish. Works made years apart could grow from the same form, which remained open to further changes.

Brâncuși rejected the label of abstract art for his sculpture:

"There are idiots who define my work as abstract. Yet what they call abstract is what is most realistic. What is real is not appearance, but the idea, the essence of things."
Il y a des imbéciles qui définissent mon œuvre comme abstraite, pourtant ce qu'ils qualifient d'abstrait est ce qu'il y a de plus réaliste, ce qui est réel n'est pas l'apparence mais l'idée, l'essence des choses.

=== Materials and method ===
In 1907, Brâncuși moved away from modeling in clay, a method used to prepare sculpture for casting, and began carving stone directly. He added wood soon afterward. Some carved forms were cast in bronze and polished individually, creating differences in size, contour, and surface among versions of the same subject.

Each material changed the character of a version. Marble retained its veins and shifts in color. Wood kept the marks of the carving tools and called for different proportions. On polished bronze, light moved across the surface and blurred the edge between the sculpture and the space around it. Brâncuși also changed the angle, height, and point at which a work met its base.

His search for an unbroken surface also appears in a statement attributed to him:

"I polished the material to find the continuous line. When I realized that I could not find it, I stopped, as though someone unseen had struck my hands."
Am șlefuit materia pentru a afla linia continuă. Și când am constatat că n-o pot afla, m-am oprit; parcă cineva nevăzut mi-a dat peste mâini.

=== The human figure ===
Brâncuși returned to The Kiss from the opening years of the 20th century onward. In the 1916 limestone version at the Philadelphia Museum of Art, the two bodies remain within a compact block. Their eyes form a single oval, the lines of their hair meet in a continuous curve, and their arms close the cubic form. A few incised lines bring the figures together without fully separating one body from the other.

In Sleeping Muse I, made in 1909–1910, the head rests on its side as an ovoid form. Closed eyes, hair, nose, and mouth are reduced to light lines on the marble. The work measures 17.2 × 27.6 × 21.2 cm and belongs to the Hirshhorn Museum and Sculpture Garden. Brâncuși returned to the sleeping head in marble, plaster, and bronze.

Danaïde, made around 1913, belongs to the same group of female heads as Sleeping Muse and Mademoiselle Pogany. In the bronze version, gold leaf separates the face from the black patina of the hair. The profile is reduced to arcs, an ovoid head, and a compact bun.

Mademoiselle Pogany grew from studies of the Hungarian painter Margit Pogány. Brâncuși enlarged the eyes, reduced the mouth to a line, and brought the hands together beneath the chin. The first marble version dates from 1912. Casts and further versions followed in later decades.

In Princess X, made in 1915–1916, the head, neck, and bust merge into one continuous curve. The version at the Centre Pompidou measures 61.7 × 40.5 × 22.2 cm and rests on a limestone element separate from the bronze sculpture. Other versions belong to the Sheldon Museum of Art and the Philadelphia Museum of Art.

Brâncuși also reduced the body to a few volumes. In Torso of a Young Man [I], the trunk and legs become a small group of wooden forms. The work retains the upright axis of the body without arms, a head, or anatomical detail.

=== Birds, fish, and movement ===
The bird entered Brâncuși's work with Măiastra, named for an enchanted bird in Romanian folklore. The polished bronze version of 1911 still has a recognizable breast, head, and tail. In Golden Bird, made in 1919–1920, the body grows longer and the details recede.

Bird in Space, begun in 1923, carried this reduction further. Wings and feathers disappear. The head and beak remain as an angled plane at the top of a narrow vertical form. Brâncuși made versions in marble and bronze. One arrived in New York in 1926 and was taxed by customs officials as a manufactured metal object. The 1928 decision in Brancusi v. United States accepted it as a work of art.

In Fish, made in 1926, an elongated form extends horizontally. The body has no eyes, fins, or scales. Its curve and polished surface give it the look of something gliding through water. Brâncuși returned to animals in works such as Le Coq and Phoque II, where movement comes from the angle and contour of the form.

=== Bases and studio arrangement ===
Brâncuși treated the base as part of the sculpture. A pedestal could continue the rhythm of the work, change its height, or bring wood, stone, and metal together. In some works, the difference between sculpture and base nearly disappears.

During the 1910s, Brâncuși arranged sculptures and pedestals in changing compositions that he called "mobile groups". He moved the works and watched how each change altered the space around them. When he sold a sculpture, he often put a plaster version in the same position. By the 1920s, the studio was also an exhibition space whose arrangement formed part of the work.

=== Târgu Jiu ensemble ===
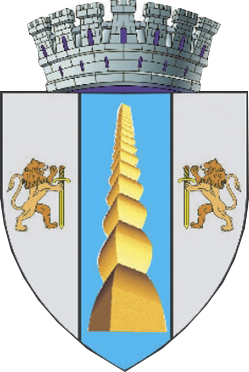
Coat of arms of Târgu Jiu, with the Endless Column in the central field

Between 1937 and 1938, Brâncuși completed the sculptural ensemble at Târgu Jiu, dedicated to the Romanian soldiers killed in World War I. Its axis begins at the Table of Silence, crosses the Avenue of Chairs and the Gate of the Kiss, and ends at the Endless Column.

The Table of Silence consists of a circular table and twelve seats. On the Gate of the Kiss, the motif of two joined figures repeats across the pillars. The Endless Column rises to 29.33 m through a repetition of rhomboidal modules. Brâncuși brought forms that he had worked in smaller sculptures of stone and wood into the open space of the city.

The Endless Column also occupies the central field of the coat of arms of Târgu Jiu, approved by the Romanian government in 2002. The official description connects the column with Brâncuși's work in the city.

=== Selected works ===
Year	Work	Material	Collection or location
1907	The Prayer	Stone	National Museum of Art of Romania, Bucharest
1907–1908	La Sagesse de la Terre (The Wisdom of the Earth)	Limestone	Private collection, Romania
1909–1910	Sleeping Muse I	Marble	Hirshhorn Museum and Sculpture Garden, Washington, D.C.
1911	Măiastra	Polished bronze	Tate, London
1911	Prometheus	Marble	Philadelphia Museum of Art
1912	Mademoiselle Pogany I	Marble	Philadelphia Museum of Art
1913	Mlle Pogany, version I	Bronze	Museum of Modern Art, New York City
c. 1913	Danaïde	Bronze, gold leaf, and black patina	Casts in public and private collections
1914–1917	Madame L.R. (Portrait de Mme L.R.)	Oak	Private collection
1915–1916	Princess X	Marble and bronze versions	Centre Pompidou, Paris, and other collections
1916	The Kiss	Limestone	Philadelphia Museum of Art
c. 1917–1922	Torso of a Young Man [I]	Wood	Philadelphia Museum of Art
1918	Endless Column, version I	Oak	Museum of Modern Art, New York City
1919–1920	Golden Bird	Polished bronze	Art Institute of Chicago
c. 1920	Sculpture for the Blind [I]	Marble	Philadelphia Museum of Art
1922	Socrates	Oak on an oak base and limestone cylinder	Museum of Modern Art, New York City
1923	Bird in Space	Marble	Metropolitan Museum of Art, New York City
1923	Eileen Lane	White onyx on a stone base	Centre Pompidou, Paris
1925–1927	Portrait of Nancy Cunard, also called Sophisticated Young Lady	Walnut on a marble base	Nelson-Atkins Museum of Art, Kansas City
1926	Fish	Polished bronze	Tate, London
1929	Portrait of James Joyce, frontispiece to Tales Told of Shem and Shaun	Printed drawing	Museum of Modern Art, New York City
1935	Le Coq (The Cock)	Plaster	Centre Pompidou, Paris
1937–1938	Sculptural Ensemble of Constantin Brâncuși at Târgu Jiu	Stone, cast iron, and steel	Târgu Jiu, Romania
1943	Phoque II (Seal II)	Blue Turquin marble	Centre Pompidou, Paris

== Death and reception ==
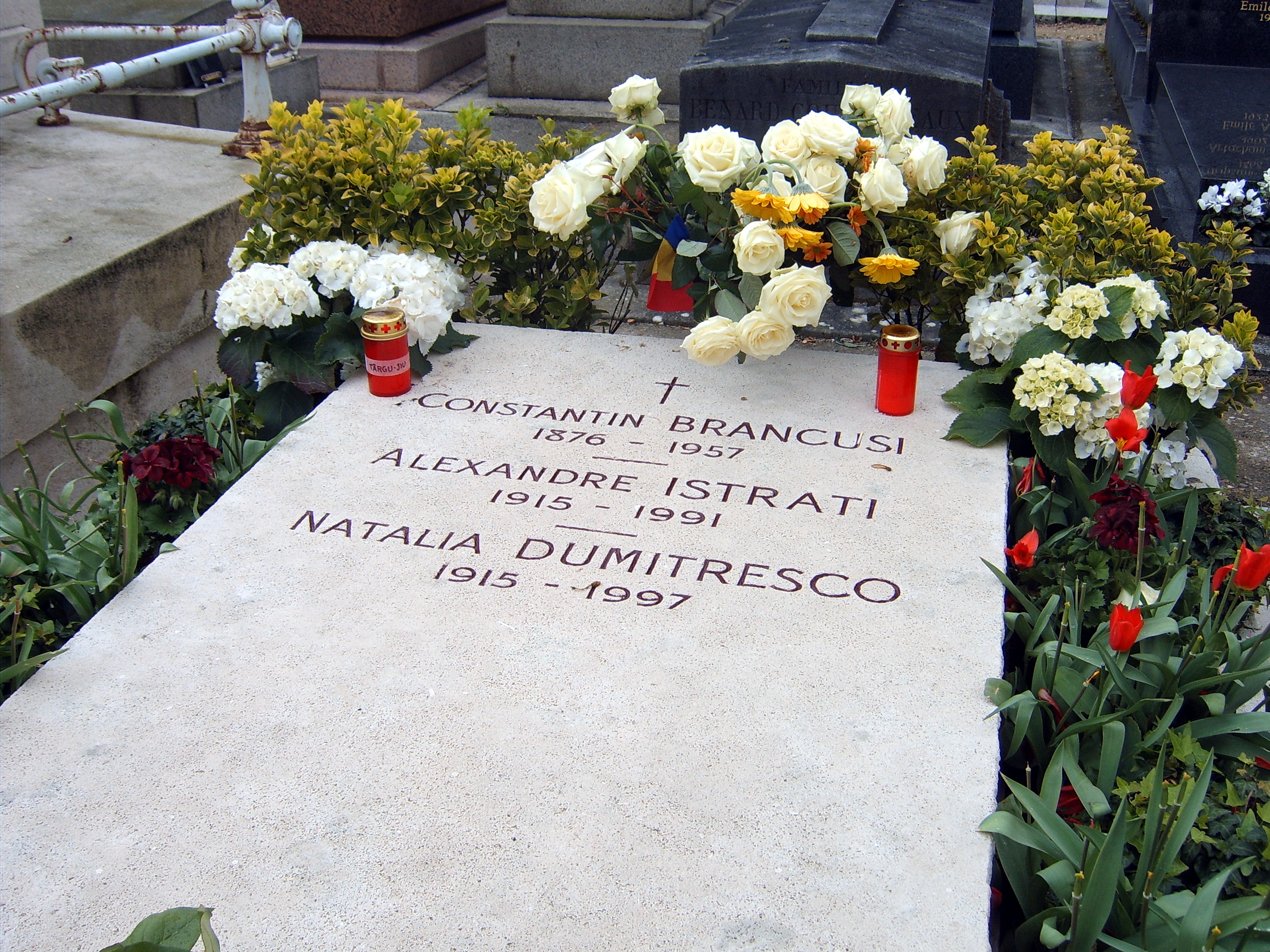
Grave of Brâncuși, Alexandre Istrati, and Natalia Dumitresco at Montparnasse Cemetery

Brâncuși died on March 16, 1957, at the age of 81. He was buried at Montparnasse Cemetery in Paris. Alexandre Istrati and Natalia Dumitresco were later buried in the same grave. Elsewhere in the cemetery is a version of The Kiss, carved by Brâncuși in 1909 and installed in 1911 on the grave of Russian medical student Tatiana Rachewskaia. The sculpture rests on a stone stele bearing the epitaph. The sculpture, stele, and grave form a single funerary monument.

Rachewskaia's grave, including The Kiss and its stele, was listed as a French monument historique in 2010. In 2021, the Council of State ruled that the sculpture had been acquired for the grave and permanently incorporated into the monument. It could not be removed and sold separately.

=== Studio and estate ===
Brâncuși bequeathed the contents of his studio to the French state on the condition that the arrangement of the works be reconstructed. The group held by the Centre Pompidou contains 137 sculptures, 87 bases, 41 drawings, two paintings, and more than 1,600 glass plates and original photographic prints.

The first museum installation opened at the Palais de Tokyo in 1962. Renzo Piano designed the reconstruction that opened beside the Centre Pompidou in 1997. During the renovation of the Centre Pompidou, the building began hosting activities organized under the Maison Pompidou program. The renovation plan assigns the building to the museum's Research and Resources Center, scheduled to open in 2030.

Swedish architect Klas Anshelm used Brâncuși's studio as one of his references when designing Malmö Konsthall, which opened in 1975.

=== Artists and writers ===
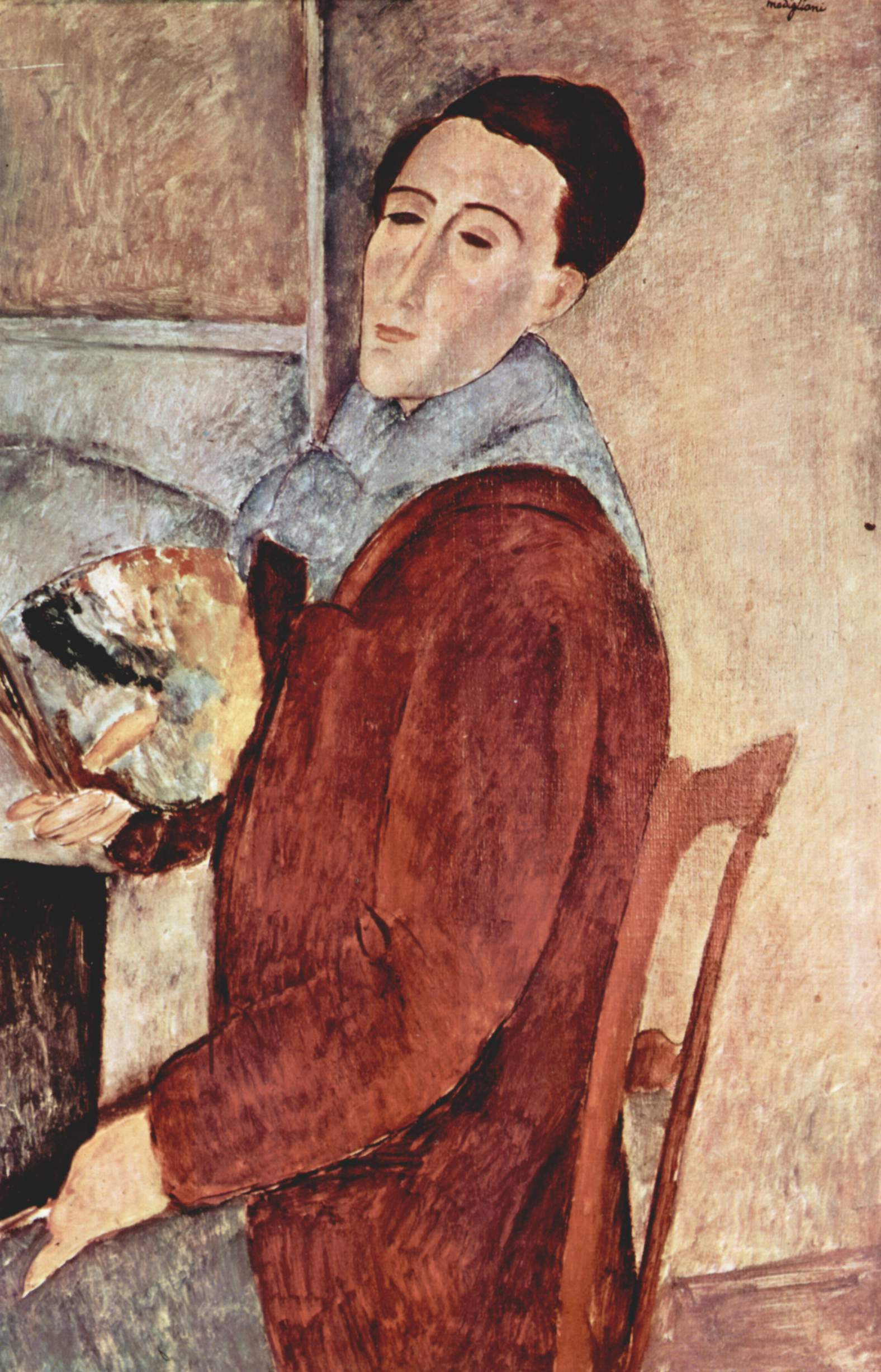
Self-portrait by Amedeo Modigliani, 1919

Brâncuși met Amedeo Modigliani in Paris in 1909, and the two became friends. Modigliani worked chiefly in sculpture from 1909 to 1914. His elongated limestone heads used simplified forms, frontal cuts, and polished surfaces also found in Brâncuși's sculpture.

In September 1957, the 22-year-old African American sculptor Richard Hunt traveled from Chicago to Paris to visit Brâncuși's studio. Hunt later incorporated the habit of working and sleeping among his sculptures and tools into his own routine.

Literary critic Lucy Jeffery relates the Bird in Space sculptures to the final Cantos of Ezra Pound. Her study examines the ways Pound and Brâncuși worked with tensions between lightness and weight, simplicity and elaboration, and fluidity and effort. The article also discusses Henri Gaudier-Brzeska, Man Ray, Mina Loy, Samuel Beckett, and Peter Russell.

In 1962, Georg Olden used Bird in Space as a starting point for the design of the Clio Award statuette.

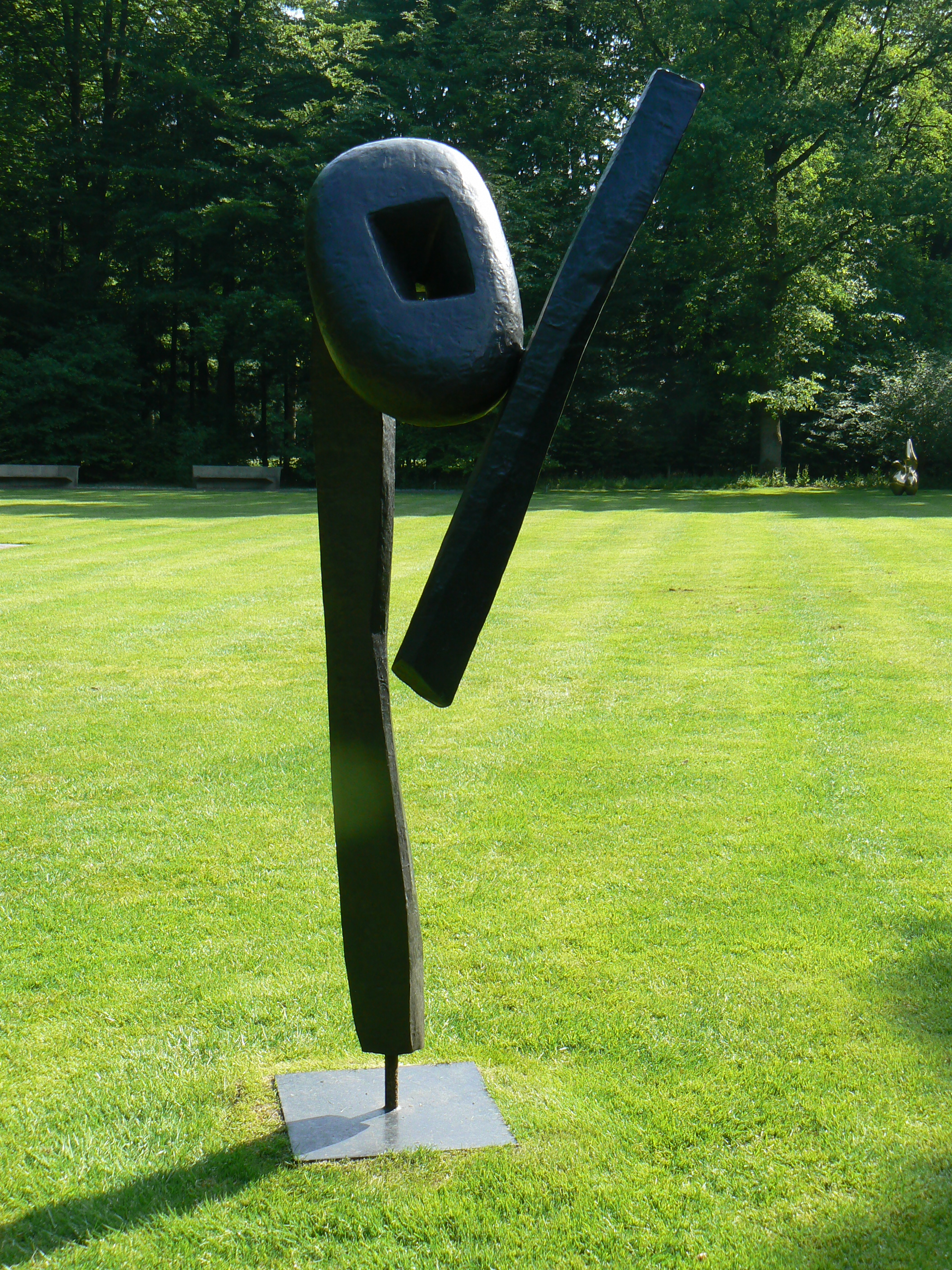
The Cry, a 1959 work by Isamu Noguchi in the sculpture garden of the Kröller-Müller Museum

Isamu Noguchi worked in Brâncuși's Paris studio in 1927. The experience drew him toward direct carving in stone and wood and toward arranging sculpture in relation to its base and surrounding space. Barbara Hepworth, Carl Andre, and Donald Judd used forms and working methods found in his sculpture. William Tucker, Christopher Wilmarth, and Scott Burton worked with pedestals, carved wood, and pieces that approached the form of furniture.

In 1972, Claes Oldenburg compared his proposal for the monumental sculpture Clothespin with Brâncuși's The Kiss in the screenprint Proposal for a Colossal Structure in the Form of a Clothespin, Compared to Brancusi's Kiss. Dan Flavin dedicated the fluorescent-light sculpture the diagonal of May 25, 1963 (to Constantin Brancusi) to Brâncuși.

=== Architecture and music ===
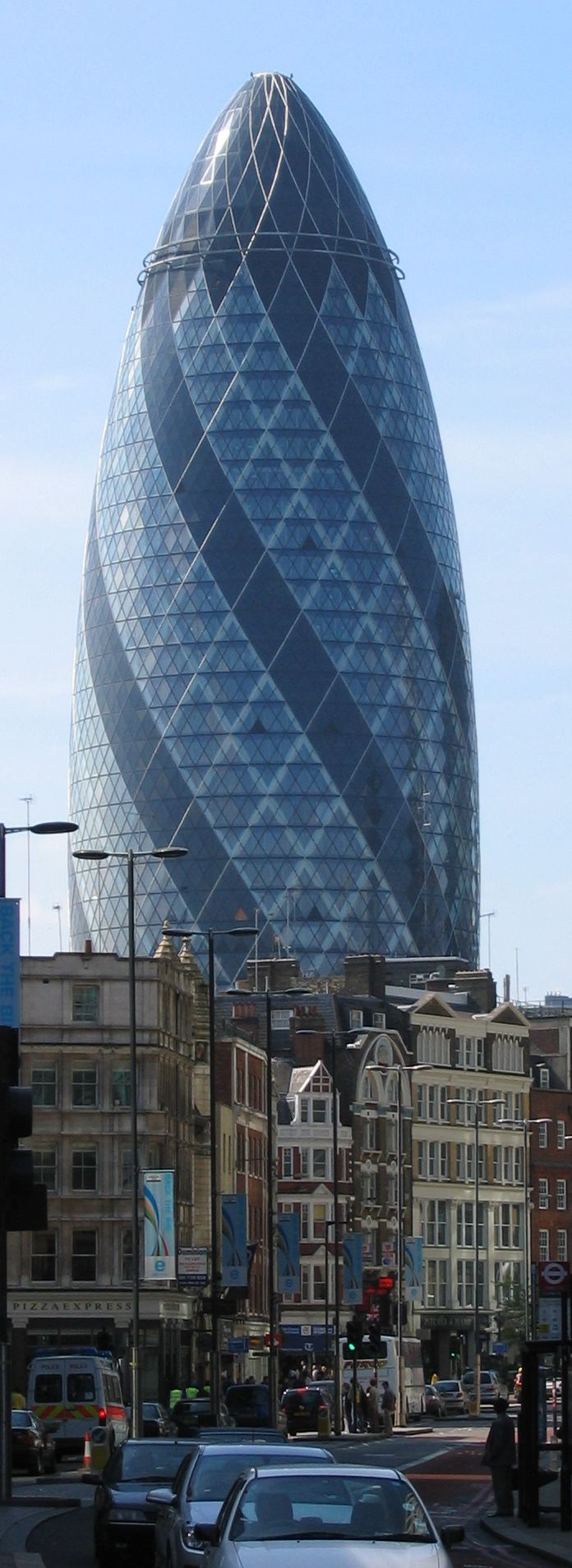
30 St Mary Axe in London, designed by Norman Foster. A model of the building was exhibited beside Brâncuși's L'Oiseau in 2004

The exhibition ArchiSkulptur: Dialoge zwischen Architektur und Plastik vom 18. Jahrhundert bis heute, held at the Fondation Beyeler in Riehen from October 3, 2004, to January 30, 2005, brought sculptures and architectural models together. A model of the Swiss Re building, now called 30 St Mary Axe, was installed beside Brâncuși's 1923/1947 marble sculpture L'Oiseau.

While working on the Obama Presidential Center in Chicago, architect Billie Tsien said that Barack Obama often spoke of his admiration for Brâncuși and asked for more angular forms and sharper cuts. Those comments led the design team to sharpen the faceted form of the museum tower.

Romanian composer György Ligeti gave his Piano Étude No. 14 the title Coloana infinită, taken from Brâncuși's Endless Column. Overlapping sequences of rising chords keep the music moving toward the upper register. An earlier and more technically demanding version was published as Étude No. 14A, Coloana fără sfârșit.

=== Art market ===
In February 2009, Madame L.R. sold for €29.185 million at Christie's in Paris. The sculpture came from the collection of Yves Saint Laurent and Pierre Bergé and set an auction record for a sculpture by Brâncuși.

In May 2018, La Jeune Fille Sophistiquée, also titled Portrait de Nancy Cunard, sold for $71 million, including fees, at Christie's in New York. The polished bronze from 1932 rests on a carved marble base. The sale set a new auction record for Brâncuși.

On May 18, 2026, Danaïde sold for $107.6 million, including fees, at Christie's in New York. The bronze cast, finished with gold leaf and black patina, had belonged to Eugene and Agnes Meyer and later to S. I. Newhouse. The sale established another auction record for Brâncuși.

== Cultural representations ==
=== Literature and visual art ===
Robert McAlmon's 1925 collection Distinguished Air: Grim Fairy Tales contained a story set in Berlin nightlife after World War I. Charles Demuth used the story as the basis for his 1930 watercolor Distinguished Air. Demuth moved the action from a Berlin café to an exhibition opening. Five figures pause before Princess X, whose phallic shape occupies the center of the composition.

In Evelyn Waugh's 1945 novel Brideshead Revisited, Anthony Blanche mentions Brâncuși while recounting a disturbance at Oxford. He explains that he tried to protect his rooms because he owned "two Brancusi sculptures and some nice things".

French artist Pierre Huyghe returned to the form of Sleeping Muse in his 2011 work Zoodram 4. The work consists of an aquarium inhabited by a hermit crab. The animal occupies an artificial resin shell molded from the reclining head Brâncuși made in 1910.

In 2021, the duo AROTIN & SERGHEI installed Infinite Light Columns on the façades of IRCAM and the Centre Pompidou during the ManiFeste festival. Four stelae made from LED panels, measuring 9, 12, 20, and 23 meters in height, formed Constellations of the Future 1-4, a work dedicated to Brâncuși. Its vertical sequence and repeated light modules drew from the structure of the Endless Column.

=== Film and television ===
Brâncuși's forms have also been used for brief references in film and television. In the 1988 film Short Circuit 2, Johnny 5 stands motionless near works in an outdoor exhibition. A passerby mistakes the robot for a sculpture and asks whether it is "an early Brâncuși". In "Astral Projections", a 1999 episode of Total Recall 2070, an investigation centers on an extraterrestrial object called the "Brancusi Stone", a name taken from its compact, polished form.

The Romanian feature film Brâncuși din Eternitate, directed by Adrian Popovici and released in 2014, alternates among three narratives. One follows Brâncuși in Paris during his mature years. Another is set in Communist Romania and follows the student Marin Etu. The third centers on the Tibetan poet and teacher Milarepa, whose writings Brâncuși read. Ioan Andrei Ionescu plays the sculptor, Alexandru Potocean plays Marin Etu, and Claudiu Bleonț plays Milarepa.

The seven-minute experimental short film A Brief History of Princess X was written and directed by Gabriel Abrantes in 2016. Joana Barrios and Francisco Cipriano play a comic version of the story behind Princess X, centered on Brâncuși, Marie Bonaparte, and the sculpture's phallic reading. The film was a Portuguese, French, and British co-production and was selected for the short-film program of the 2016 Toronto International Film Festival.

Peter Greenaway worked for several years on Walking to Paris, a film about Brâncuși's journey from Romania to France. The screenplay follows the sculptor at the age of 27 and turns the journey into a sequence of imagined meetings and episodes. The first trailer was released in March 2022.

In September 2016, director Mick Davis announced another biographical film, The Sculptor, with Andy Garcia cast as Brâncuși. Davis had previously directed Garcia as Amedeo Modigliani in the 2004 film Modigliani.

=== Documentaries and stage ===
Cornel Mihalache directed the 1996 Romanian documentary Brâncuși. The film follows the sculptor's chronology through photographs, notes, and footage of the places where he lived and worked.

Laurențiu Damian's 2001 documentary Constantin Brâncuși: Coloana sau lecția despre infinit follows the restoration of the Endless Column from 1996 to 2000. Footage of work on the column is interspersed with passages about Brâncuși and the Târgu Jiu ensemble. Sorana Georgescu-Gorjan, daughter of engineer Ștefan Georgescu-Gorjan, wrote the film's commentary. The production received the Romanian Filmmakers Union's documentary award in 2002.

Alain Fleischer directed Brancusi: les métamorphoses de la sculpture, produced in 2024 for ARTE France with the Centre Pompidou and Le Fresnoy. The 52-minute documentary was filmed in Brâncuși's reconstructed studio and uses photographs and films made by the sculptor.

The multimedia stage work Brâncuși, dragostea mea, based on a book by Claudia Motea, brings together nine women from the sculptor's biography. Motea plays all nine characters, including Margit Pogány, Eileen Lane, Peggy Guggenheim, Marie Bonaparte, and Renée Frachon. Marius Bodochi provides the voice of Brâncuși, Mădălina Ene plays the piano, and Beatrice Rancea directed the production.

In November 2025, the Romanian National Opera, Bucharest and the Romanian Cultural Institute presented Sonoritățile Infinitului: De la muzica lui George Enescu la muzica lui Constantin Brâncuși. The first part of the program consisted of compositions by George Enescu. The second used jazz and songs from the repertoire of Maria Tănase that Brâncuși listened to, accompanied by live sand animation by Mariana Pachis.

== Honors and commemorations ==
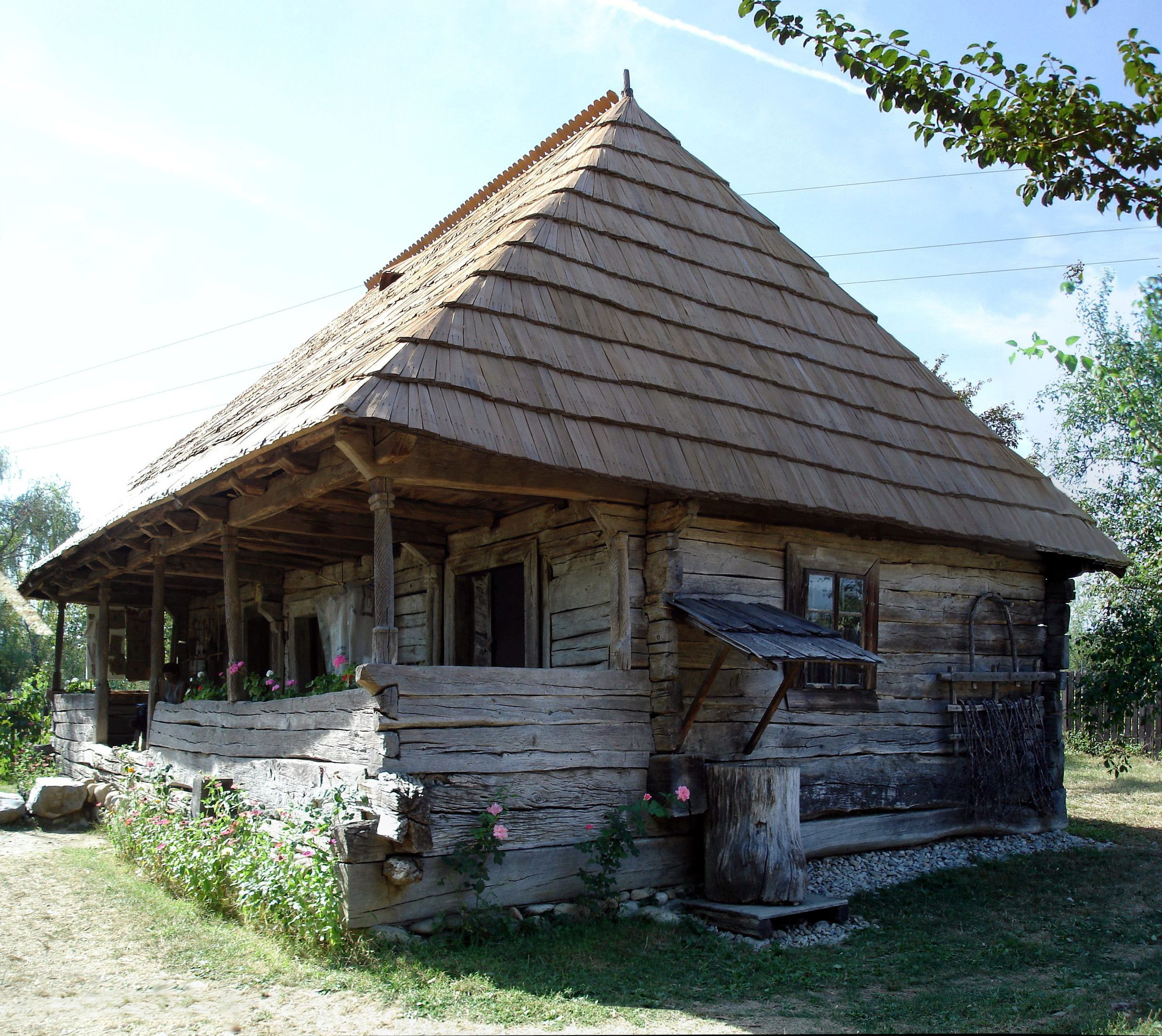
Constantin Brâncuși Memorial House in Hobița

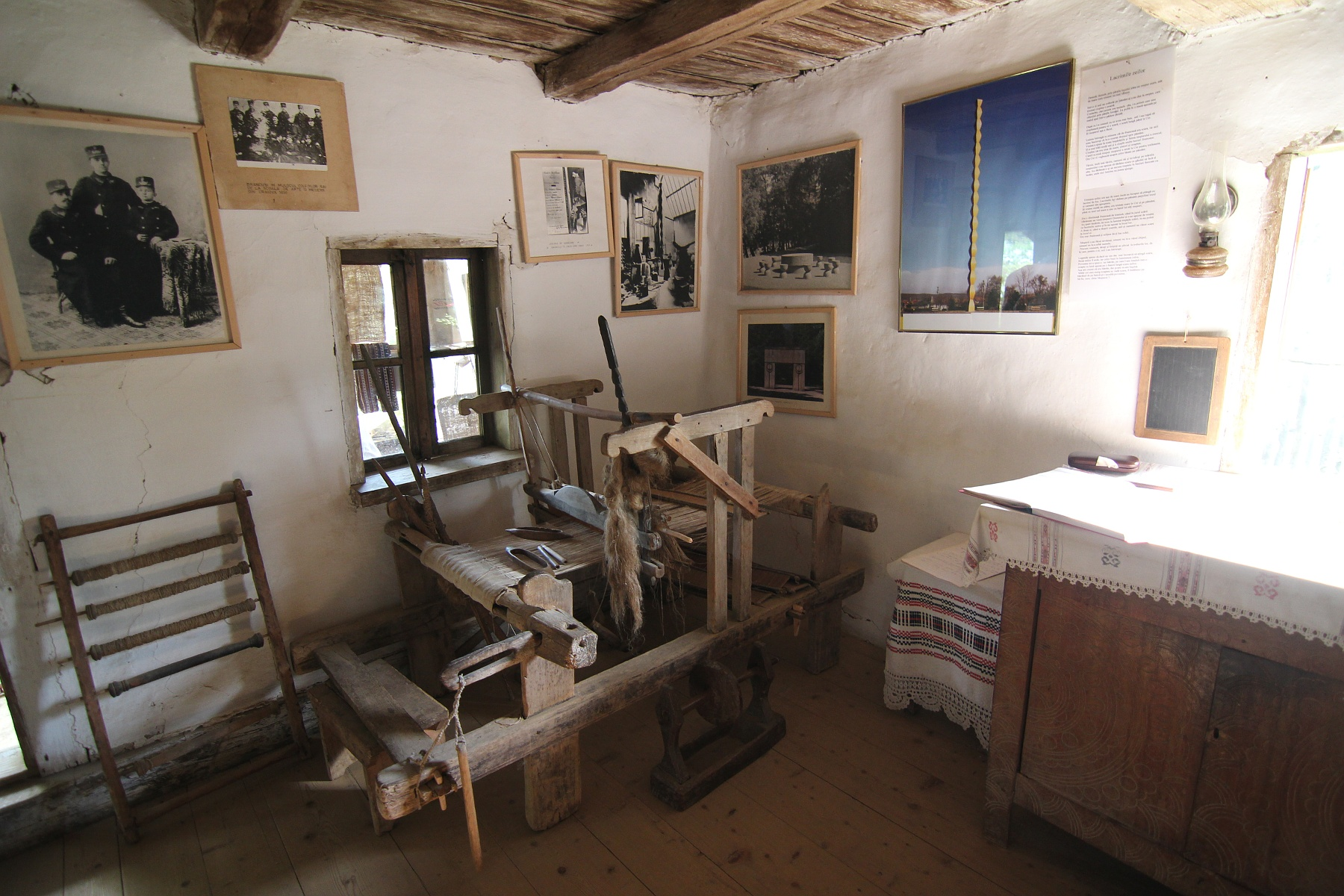
Constantin Brâncuși Memorial Museum in Hobița

The Constantin Brâncuși Memorial House opened in his native village of Hobița in November 1971 as a branch of the Alexandru Ștefulescu District Museum of Gorj. Brâncuși was elected posthumously to the Romanian Academy in 1990.

In 2011, Google created a Google Doodle for the 135th anniversary of Brâncuși's birth. The design incorporated seven of his works.

The National Museum of Art of Romania and the Craiova Art Museum hold works by Brâncuși. In the United States, his sculpture is held by institutions including the Museum of Modern Art in New York and the Philadelphia Museum of Art. The Museum of Modern Art has the largest group of Brâncuși sculptures in the United States.

Constantin Brâncuși University of Târgu Jiu and the Constantin Brâncuși metro station in Bucharest bear his name.

The National Bank of Romania issued 500-leu banknotes bearing Brâncuși's portrait in 1991 and 1992. The 1991 note shows the sculptor on the obverse and Brâncuși seated beside one of his works on the reverse. The redesigned 1992 note combines his portrait with images of his sculptures.

The main-belt asteroid 6429 Brâncuși was named in his honor.

In 2015, the Romanian Parliament designated February 19 as Brâncuși Day. The observance does not entail a public holiday or a day off work.

=== Memorials and public monuments ===
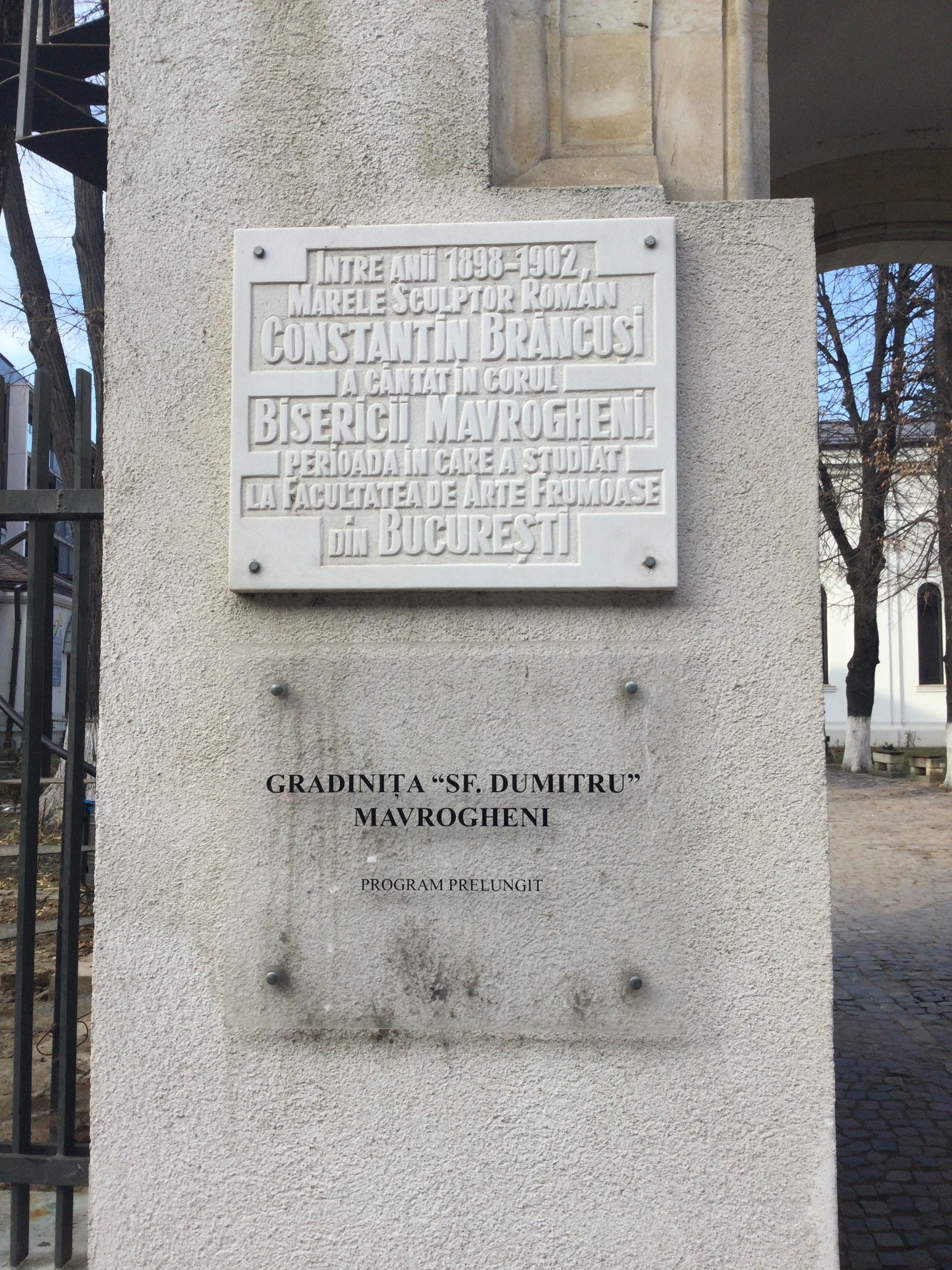
Plaque in Bucharest

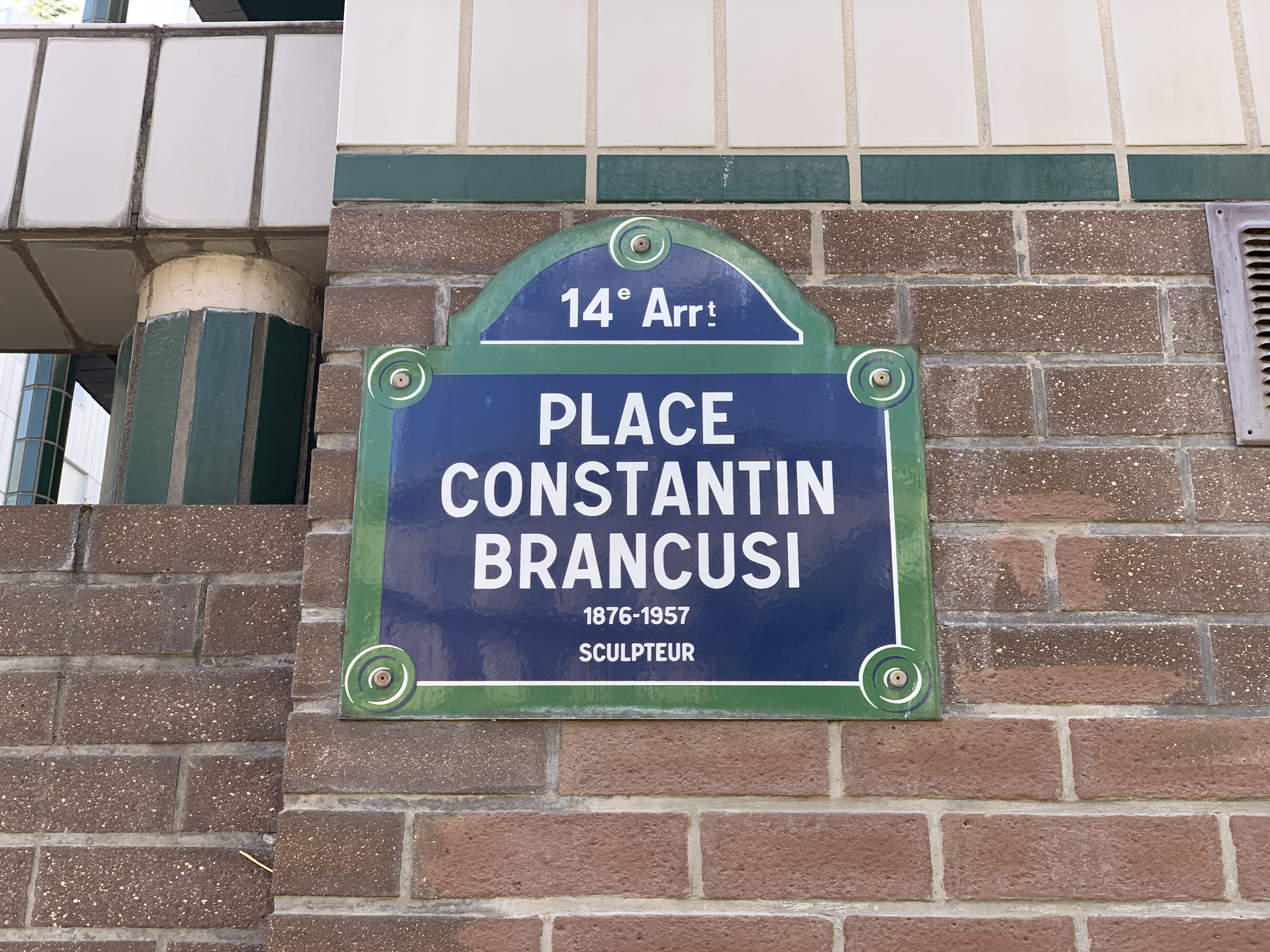
Street plaque in the 14th arrondissement of Paris

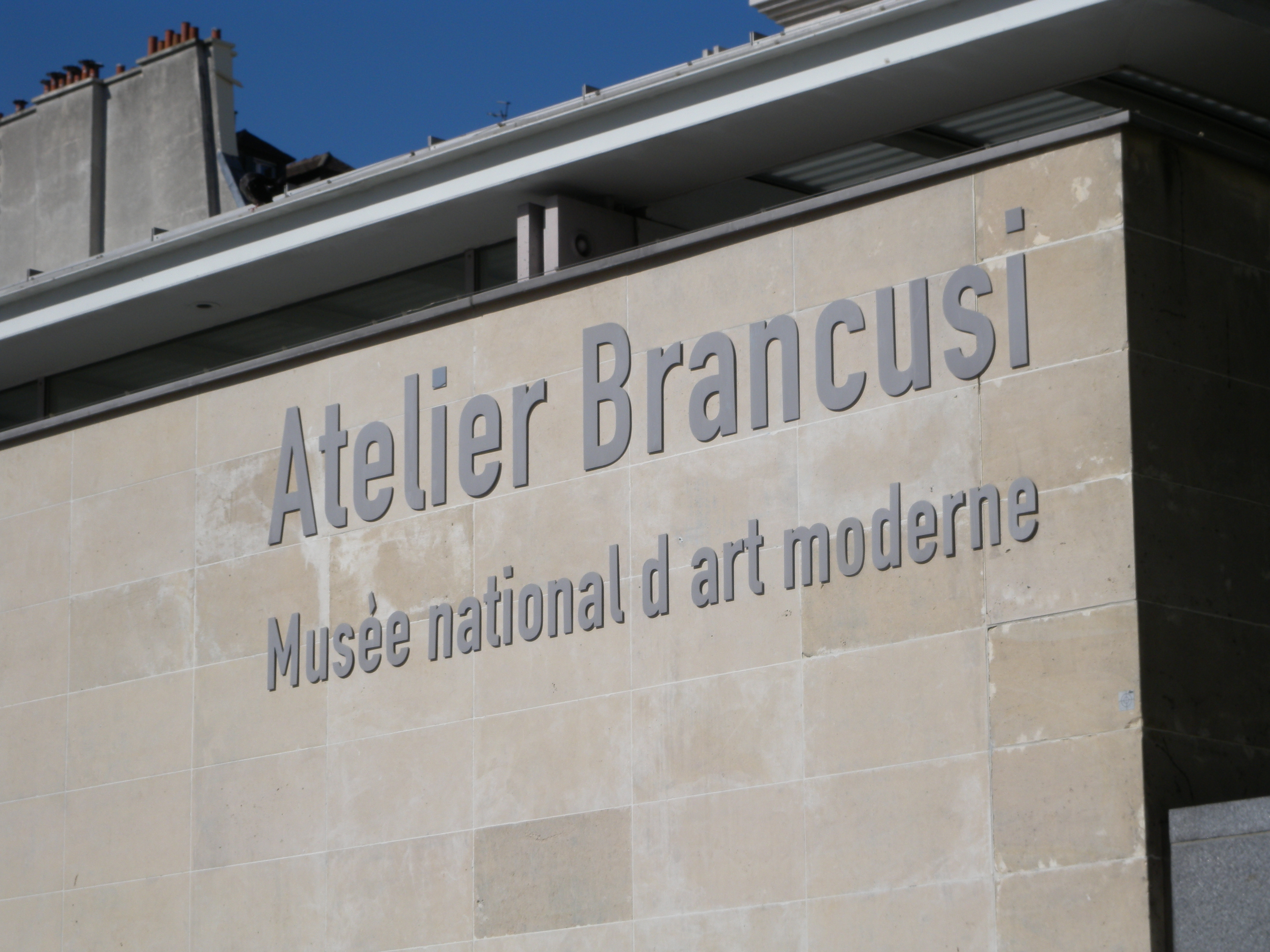
Brâncuși's reconstructed studio in Paris

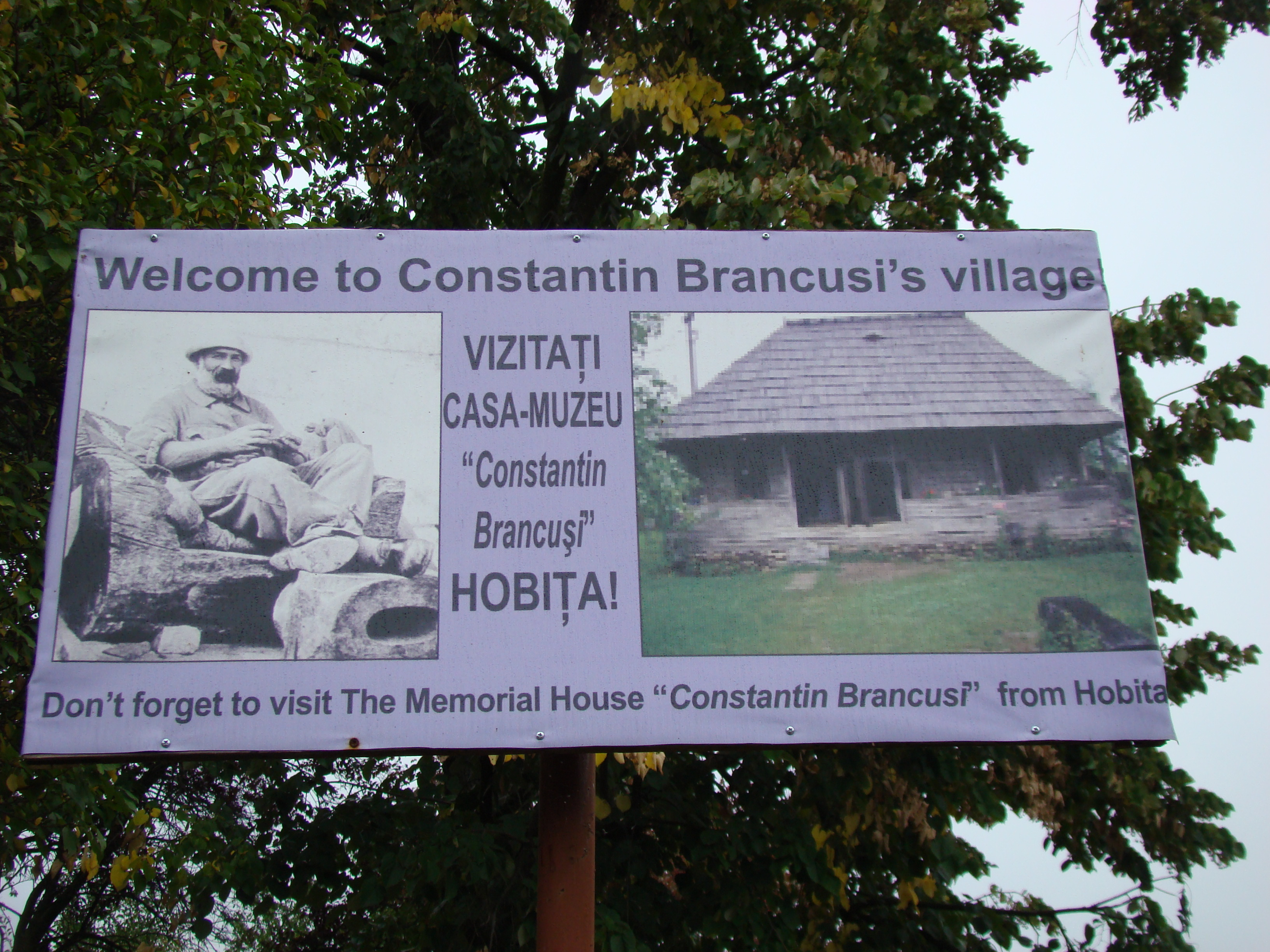
Constantin Brâncuși Memorial House in Hobița

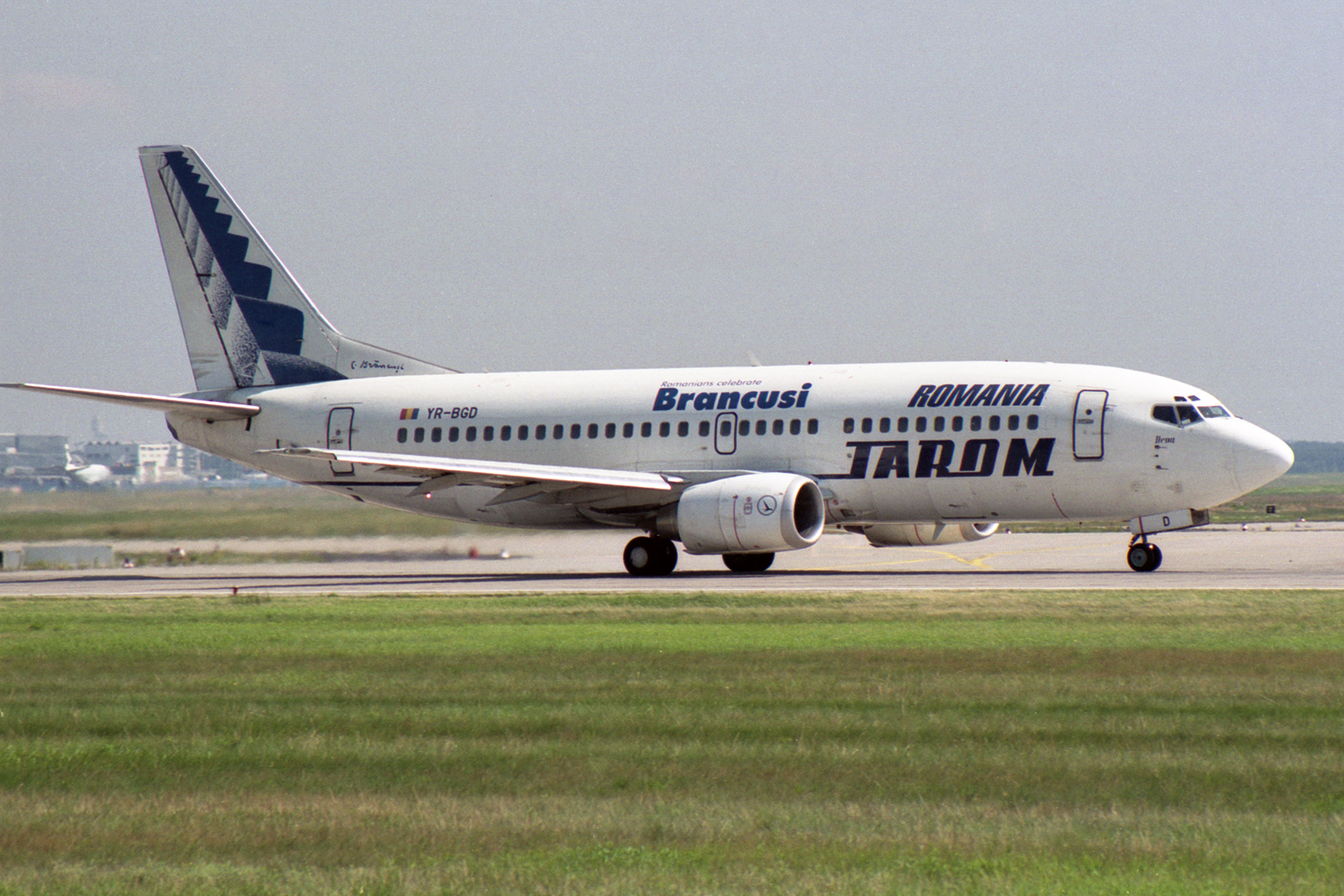
TAROM Boeing 737 with a Brâncuși-themed livery

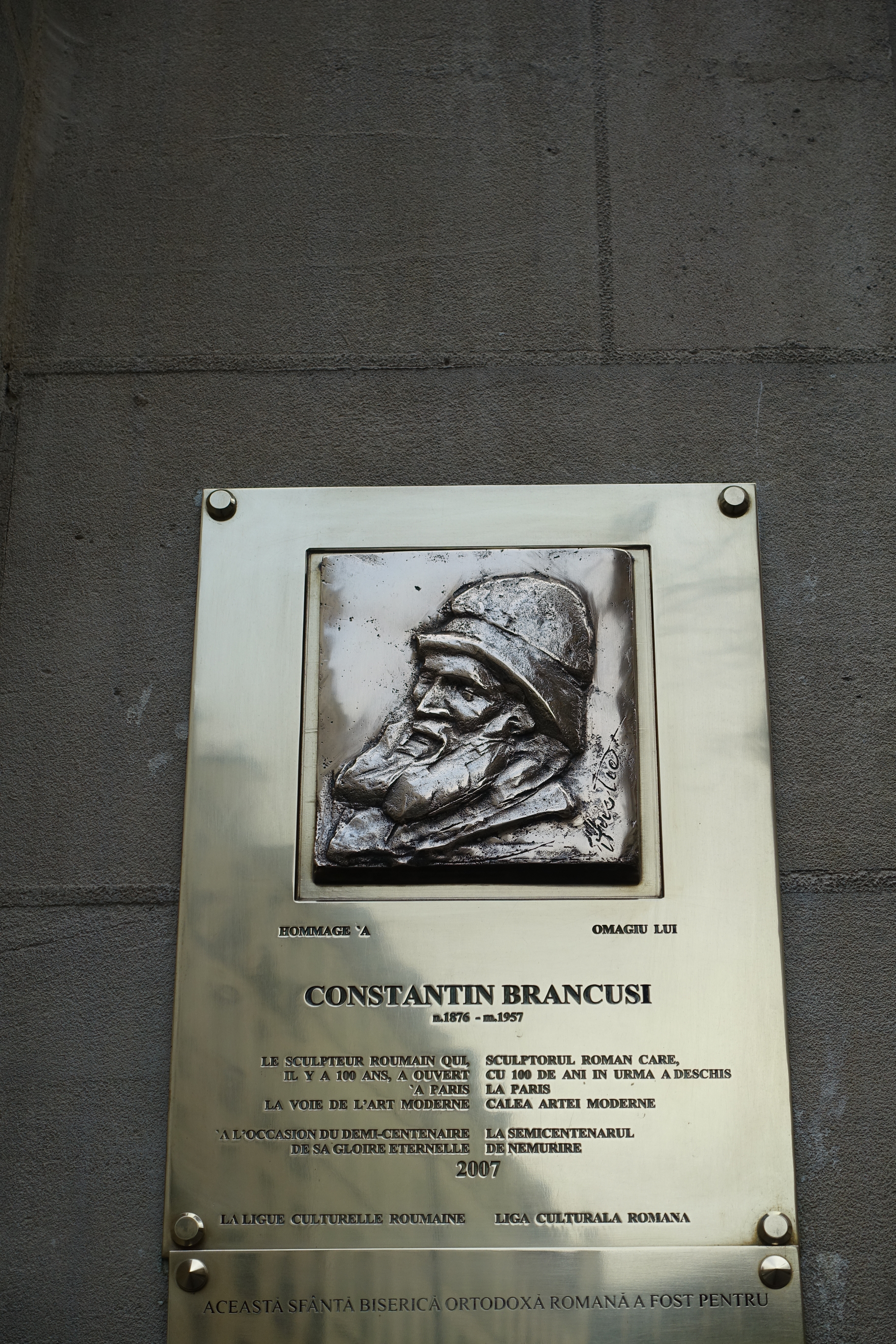
Commemorative plaque at the Romanian Orthodox Church in Paris

=== Postage stamps ===
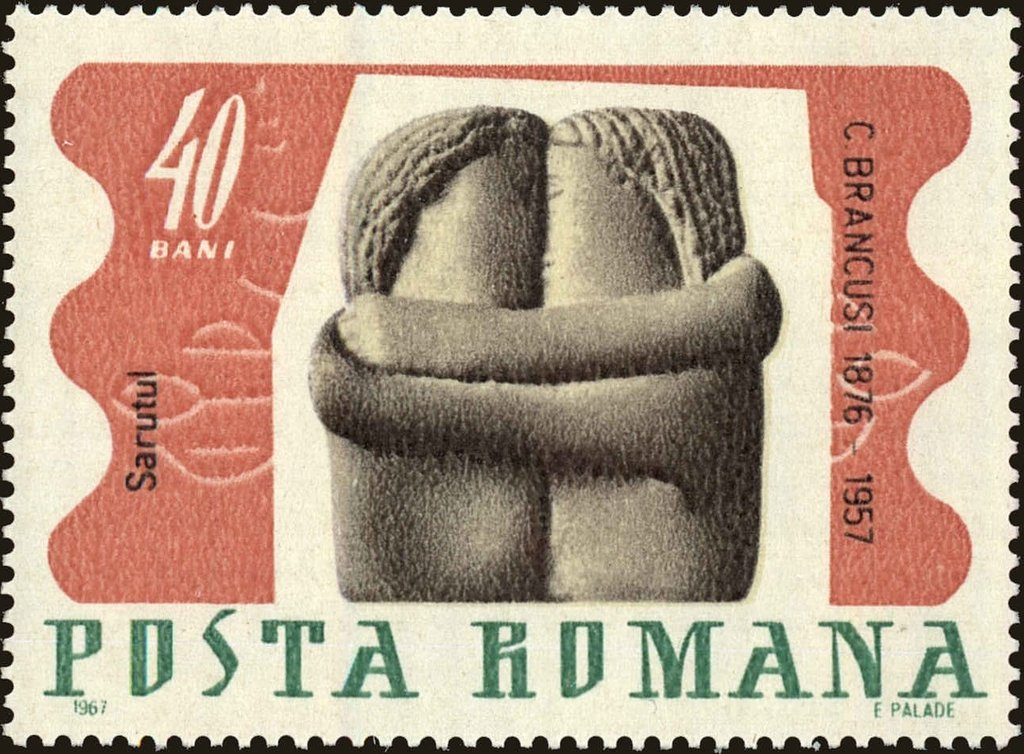
Romanian stamp, 1967

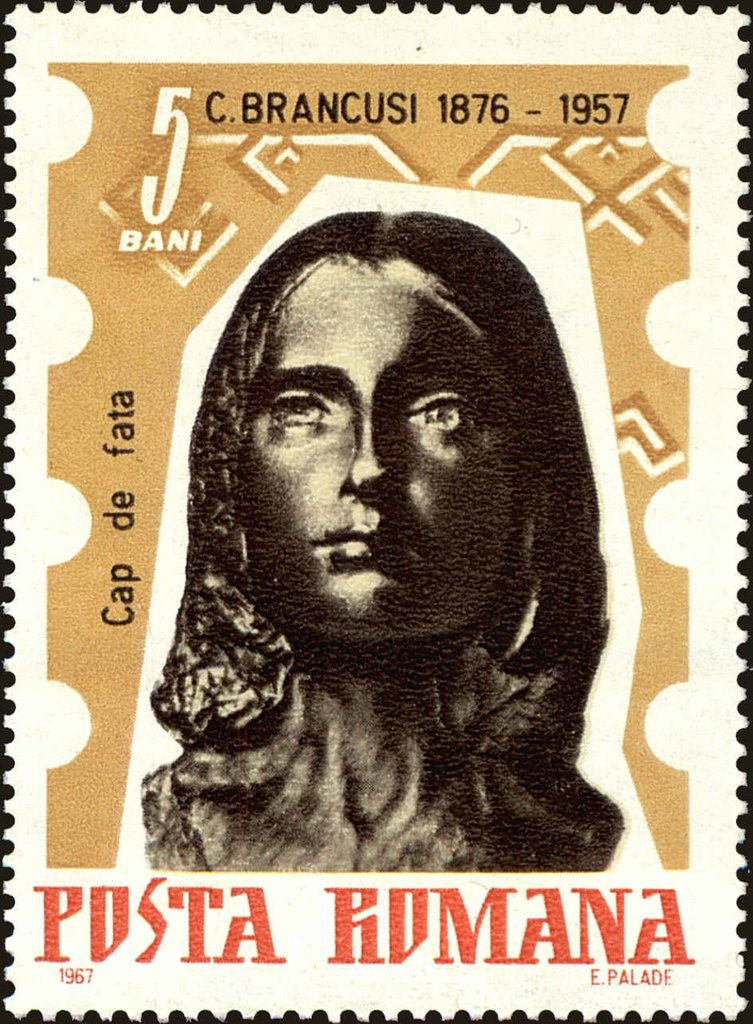
Romanian stamp, 1967

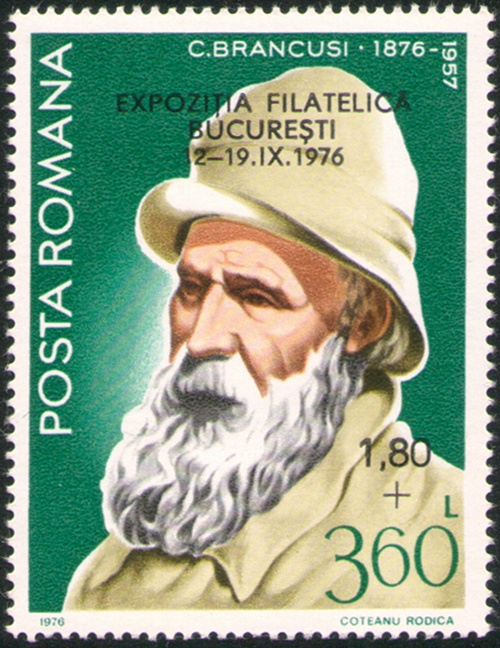
Romanian stamp, 1976

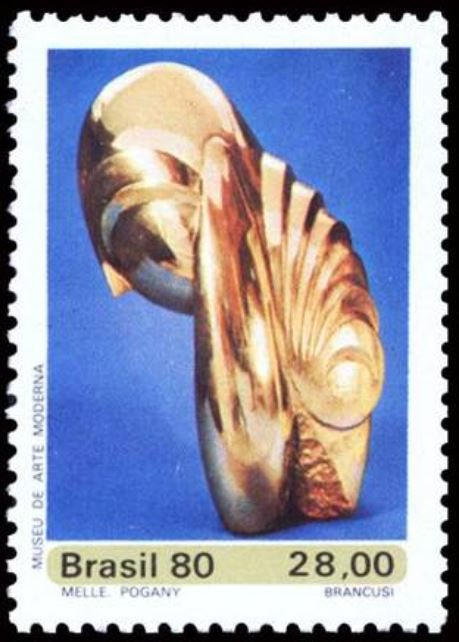
Brazilian stamp, 1980

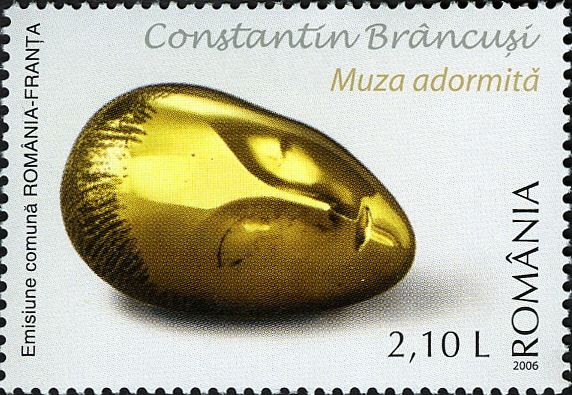
Romanian stamp, 2006

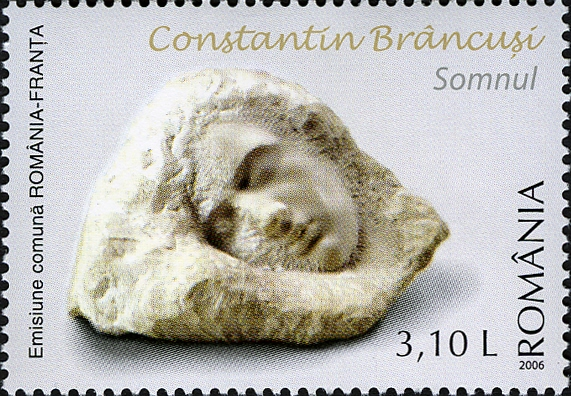
Romanian stamp, 2006

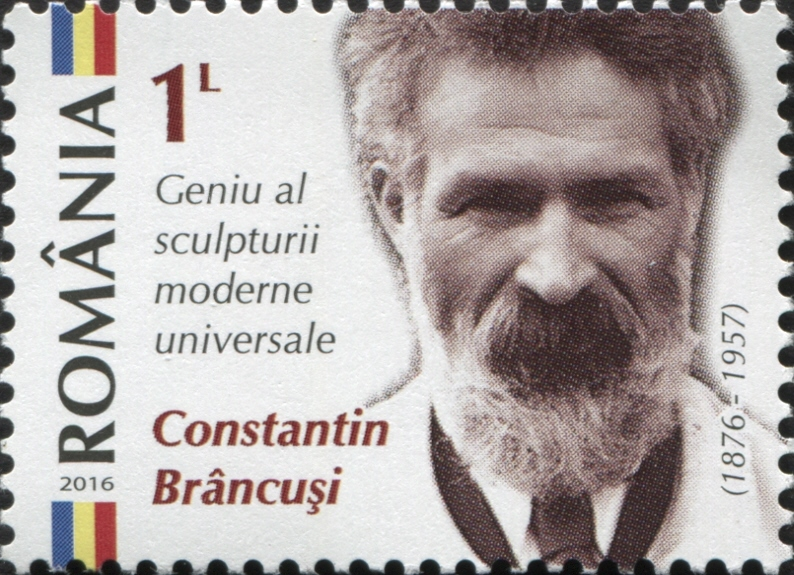
Romanian stamp, 2016

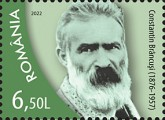
Romanian stamp, 2022

=== Coins and banknotes ===
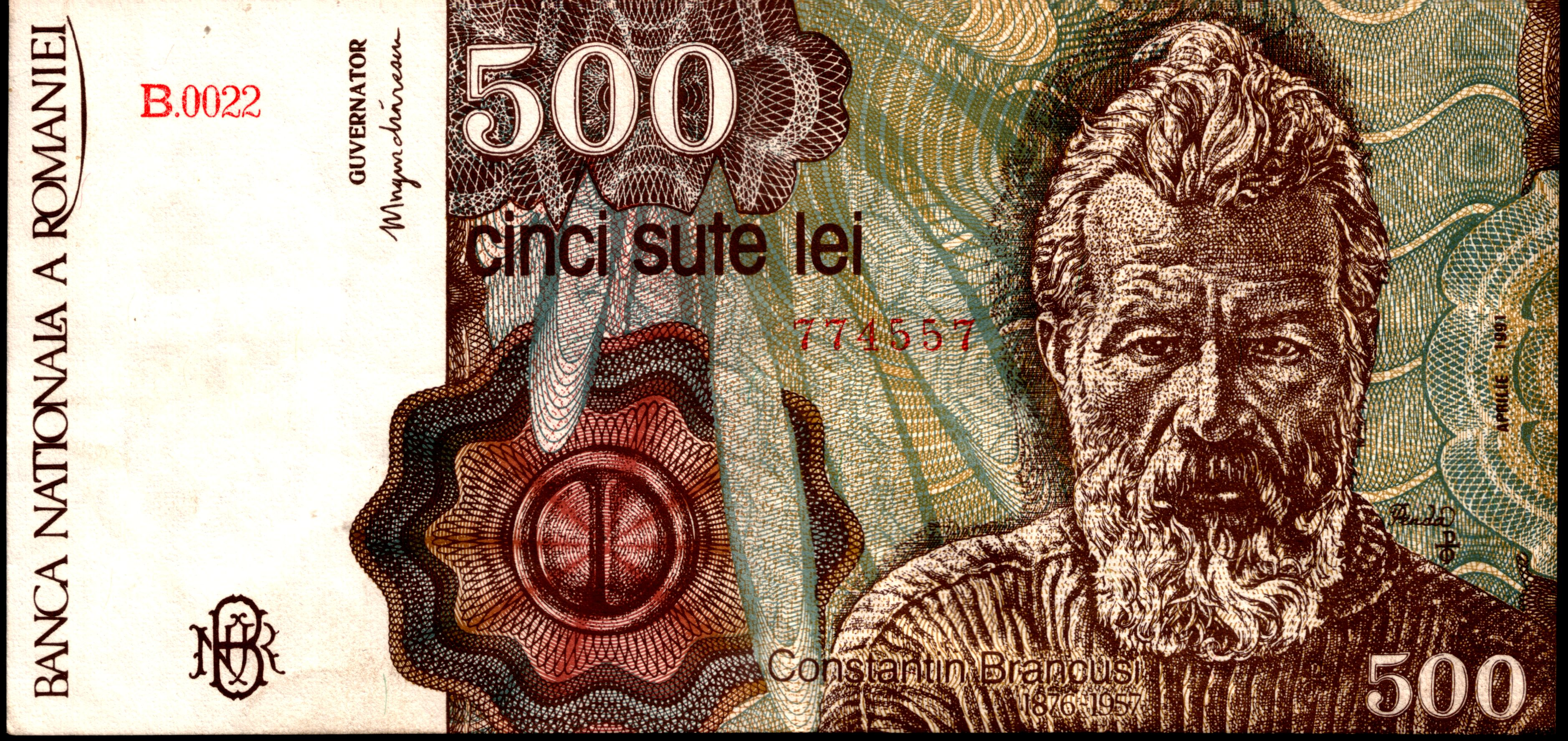
Romanian 500-leu banknote, 1991, obverse

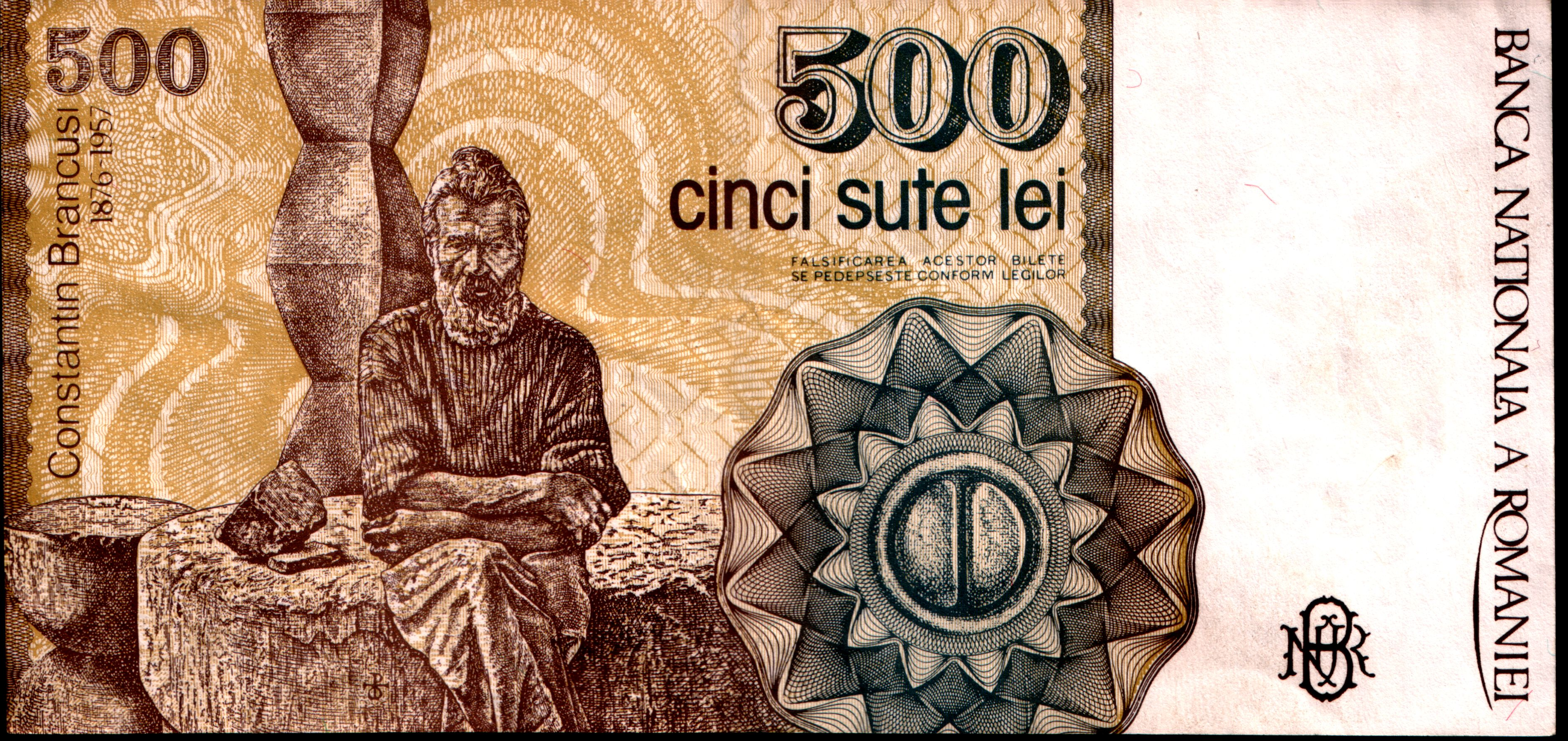
Romanian 500-leu banknote, 1991, reverse

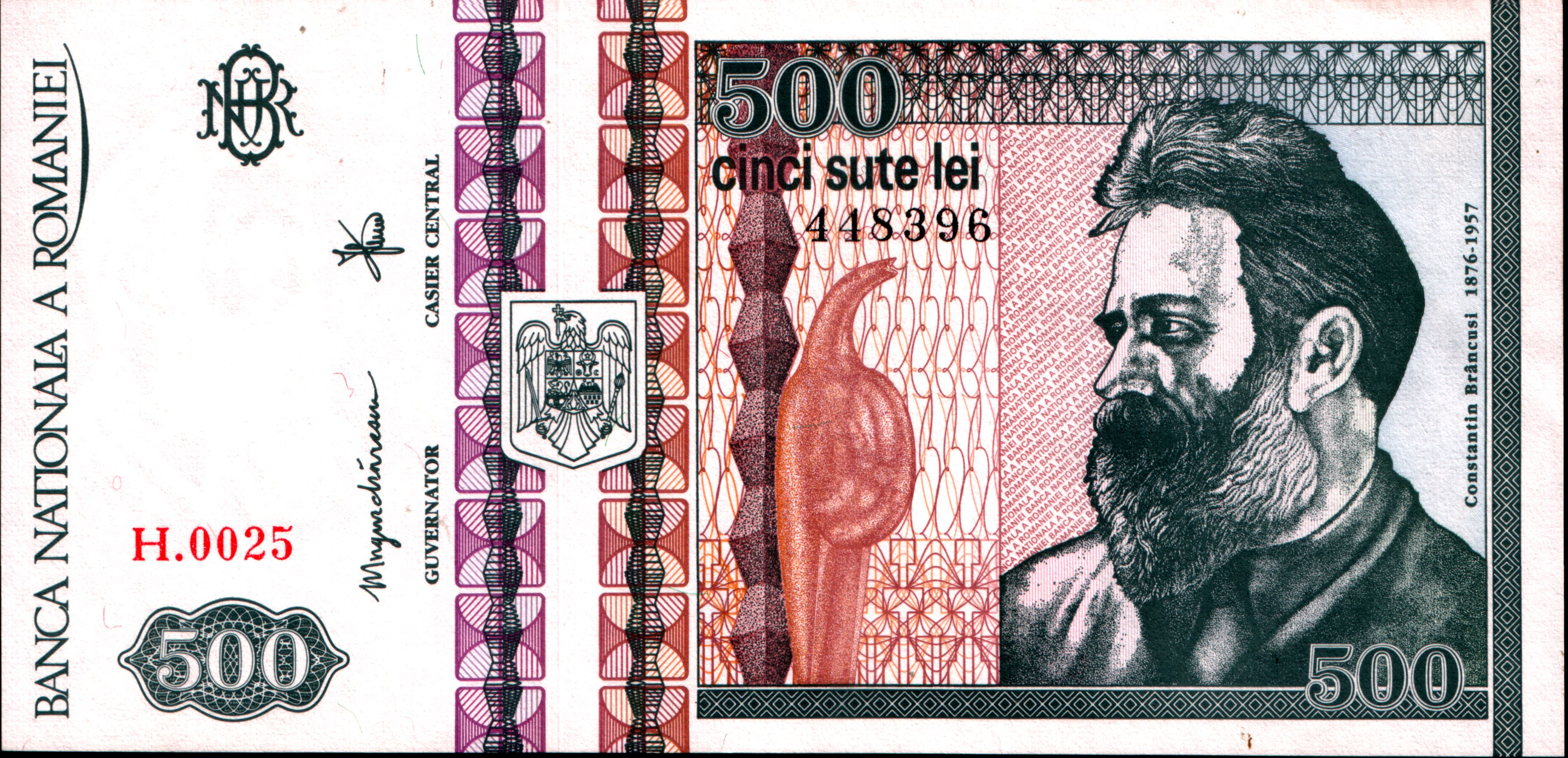
Romanian 500-leu banknote, 1992, obverse

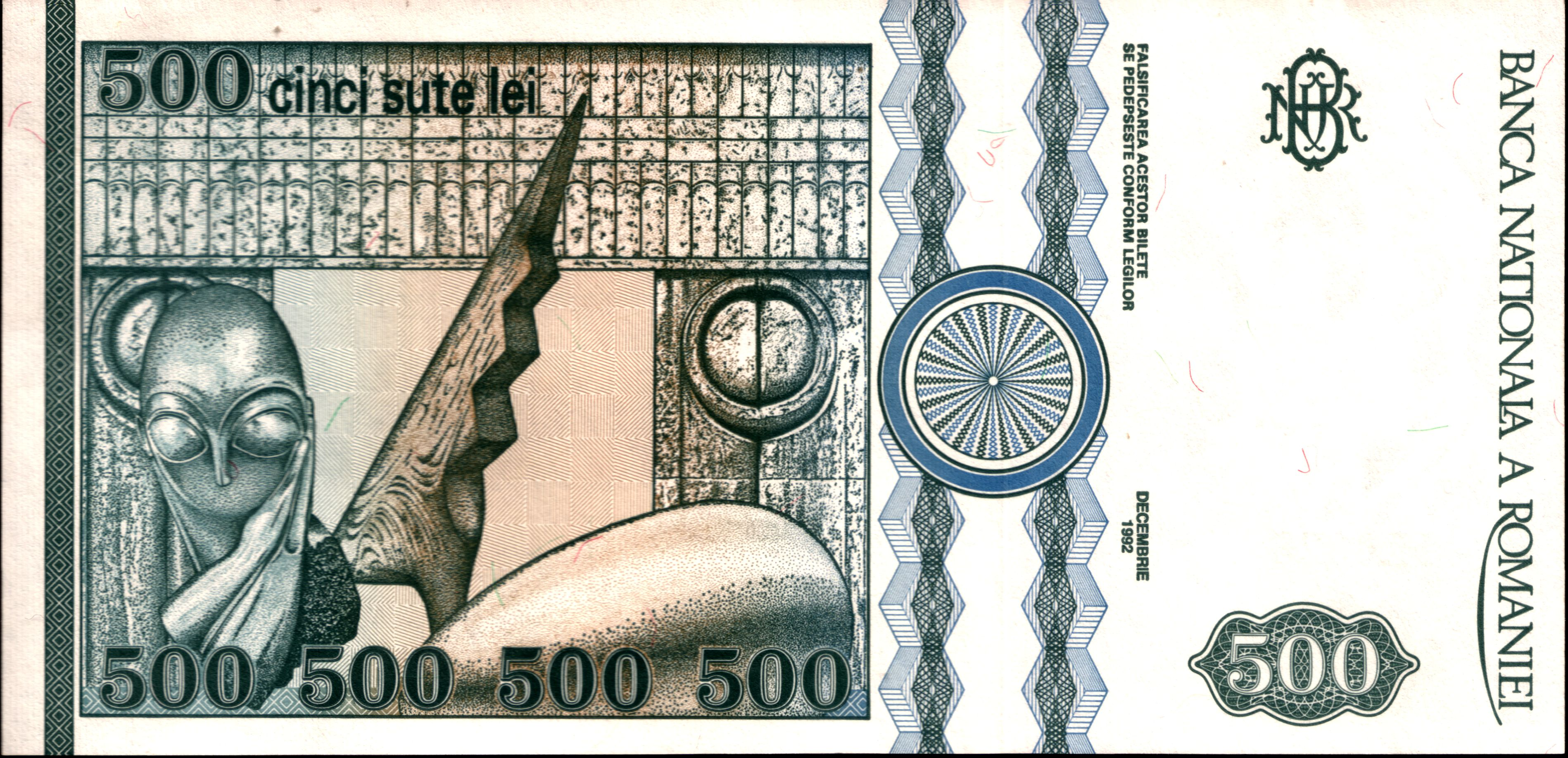
Romanian 500-leu banknote, 1992, reverse

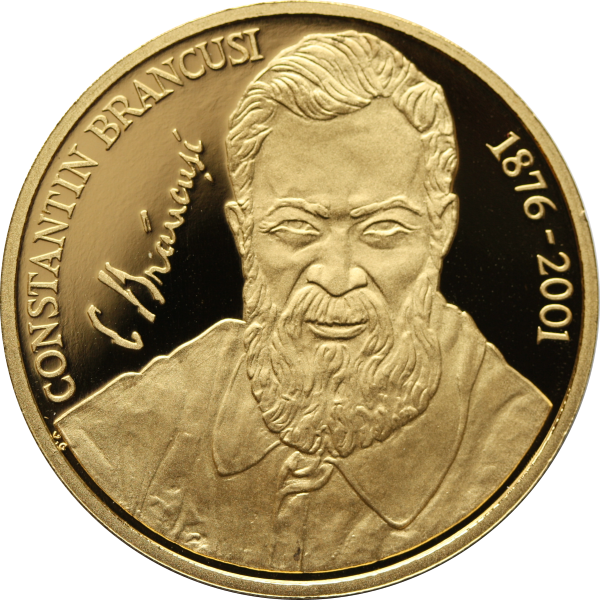
Romanian 5,000-leu coin, 2001

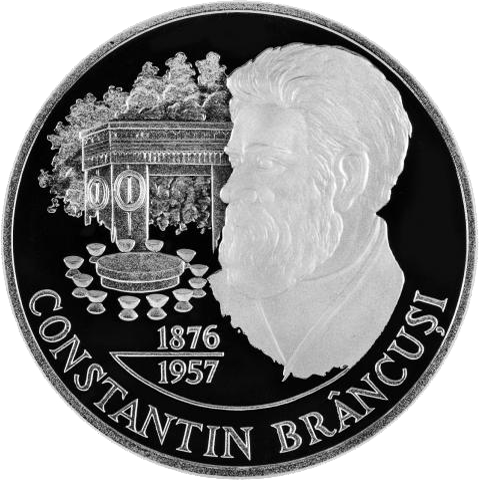
Moldovan 50-leu coin, 2001

== Exhibitions ==
=== Exhibitions during his lifetime ===
Brâncuși participated in the 1913 Armory Show. His first solo exhibition in the United States, An Exhibition of Original Sculpture, in Bronze, Marble, and Wood, by Constantin Brancusi, of Paris, was held at 291 in New York City from March 12 to April 4, 1914. In 1936, the Museum of Modern Art included his work in Cubism and Abstract Art.

In 1955, the Solomon R. Guggenheim Museum organized a Brâncuși retrospective in New York. The exhibition later traveled to the Philadelphia Museum of Art.

=== Posthumous retrospectives ===
- 1969: Constantin Brancusi, 1876–1957: A Retrospective Exhibition, organized by the Solomon R. Guggenheim Museum in collaboration with the Philadelphia Museum of Art and the Art Institute of Chicago.
- 1995: Constantin Brancusi, Centre Pompidou, Paris, April 14 to August 21, and the Philadelphia Museum of Art, October 8 to December 31.
- 1996: Brancusi: A Special Installation, Selected Masterworks from the Musée National d'Art Moderne and The Museum of Modern Art, New York, Museum of Modern Art, January 18 to May 5.
- 2004: Constantin Brancusi: The Essence of Things, Tate Modern, London, January 29 to May 23, and the Solomon R. Guggenheim Museum, New York, June 11 to September 19.
- 2018–2019: Constantin Brancusi Sculpture, Museum of Modern Art, July 22, 2018, to June 15, 2019.
- 2019–2020: Brancusi, BOZAR, Brussels, October 2, 2019, to February 2, 2020.
- 2023–2024: Brâncuși: Romanian Sources and Universal Perspectives, National Art Museum of Timișoara, September 30, 2023, to January 28, 2024.
- 2024: Brancusi, Centre Pompidou, March 27 to July 1.
- 2026: Brancusi, Neue Nationalgalerie, Berlin, March 20 to August 9. Organized with the Centre Pompidou, the exhibition brought together more than 150 sculptures, photographs, drawings, films, and archival materials. It was the first Brâncuși exhibition of comparable scale in Germany in more than fifty years. The exhibition later traveled to the Museum of Modern Art, as Brancusi: The Artist and His Studio, from October 25, 2026, to February 27, 2027. The temporary closure of the Centre Pompidou prompted the museum to send the Atelier Brancusi (which Brancusi bequeathed to the French State upon his death in 1957) to Neue Nationalgalerie in Berlin and the Museum of Modern Art in New York.

== Gallery ==
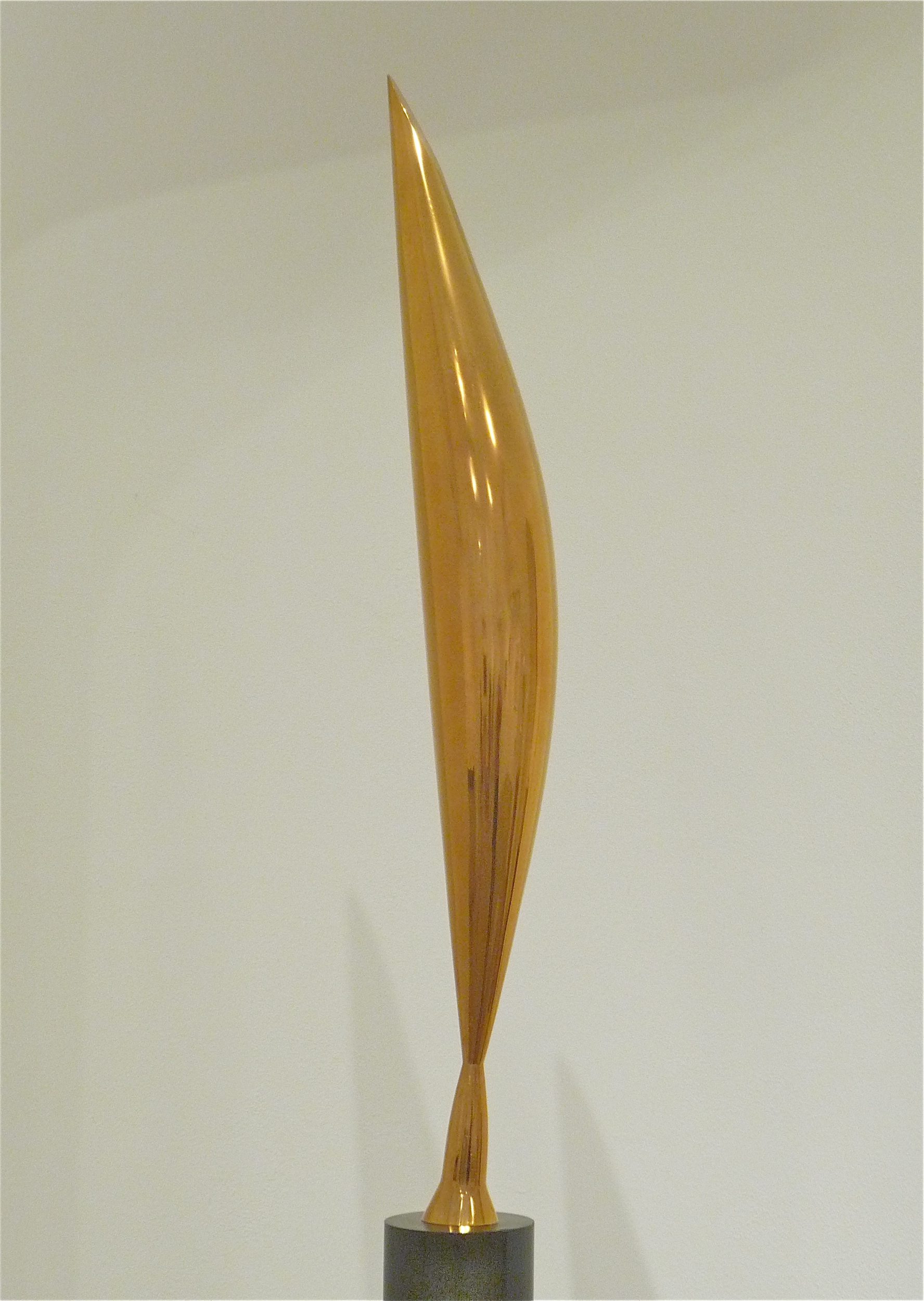
Bird in Space, from the series of sculptures of the same title

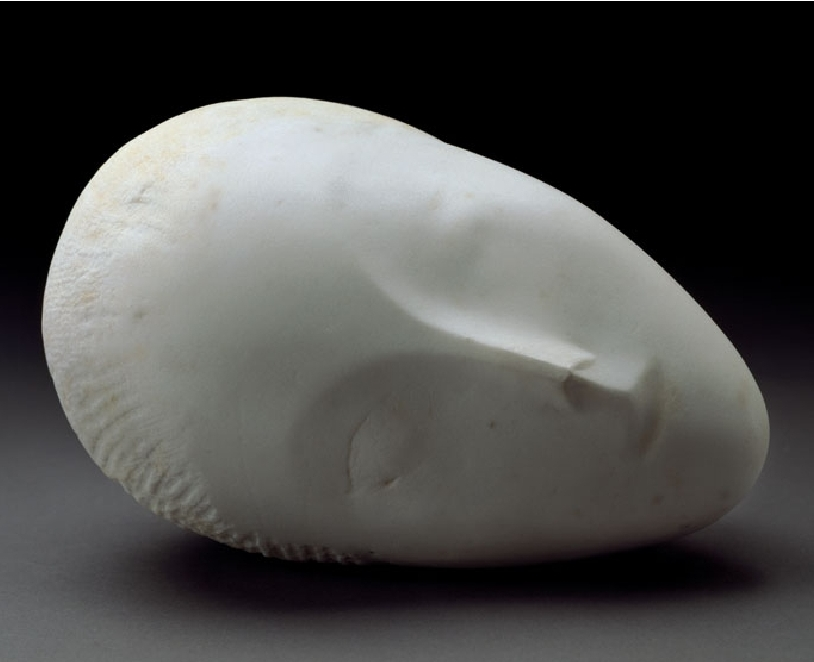
Sleeping Muse

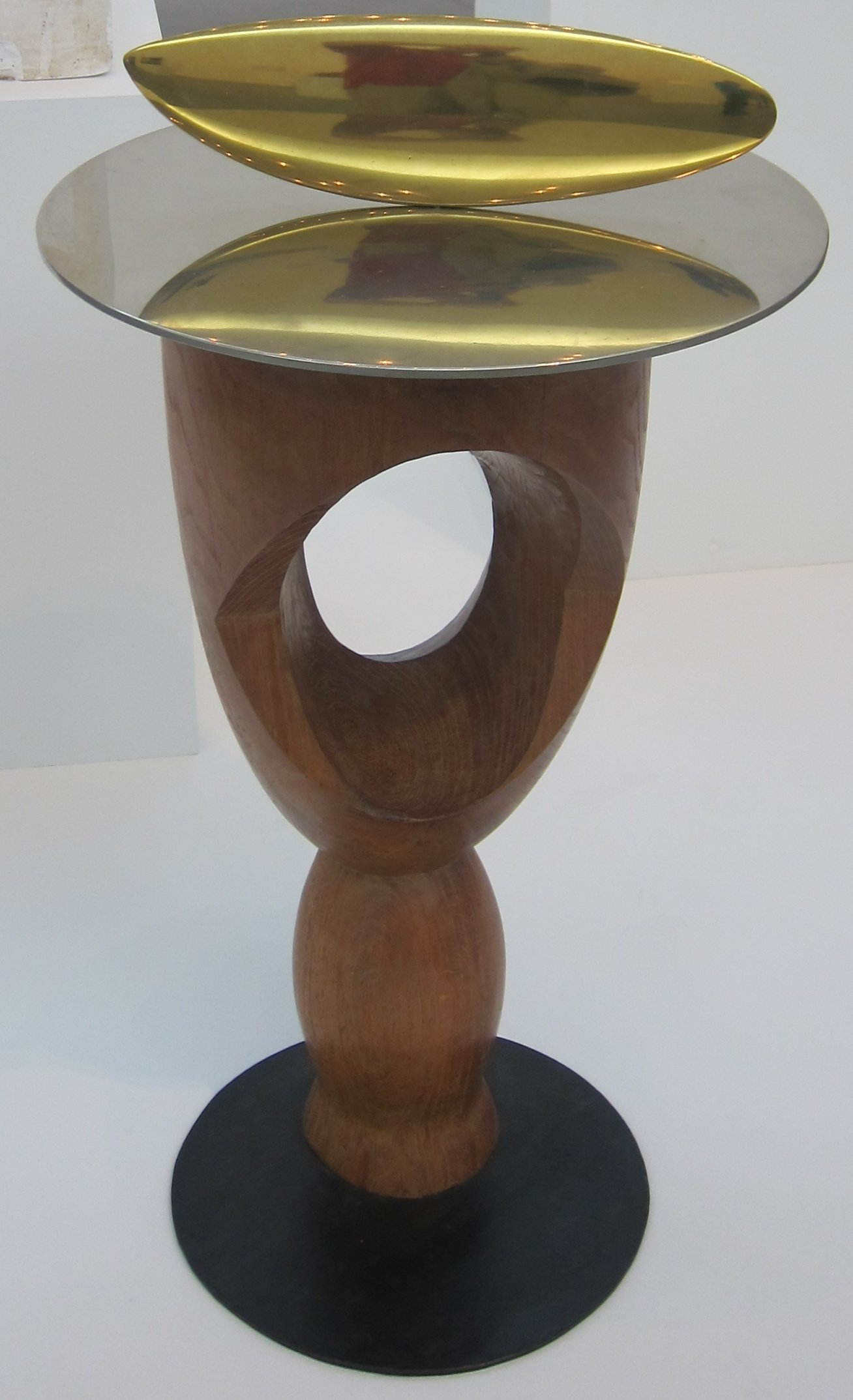
Fish, 1926, Tate Modern

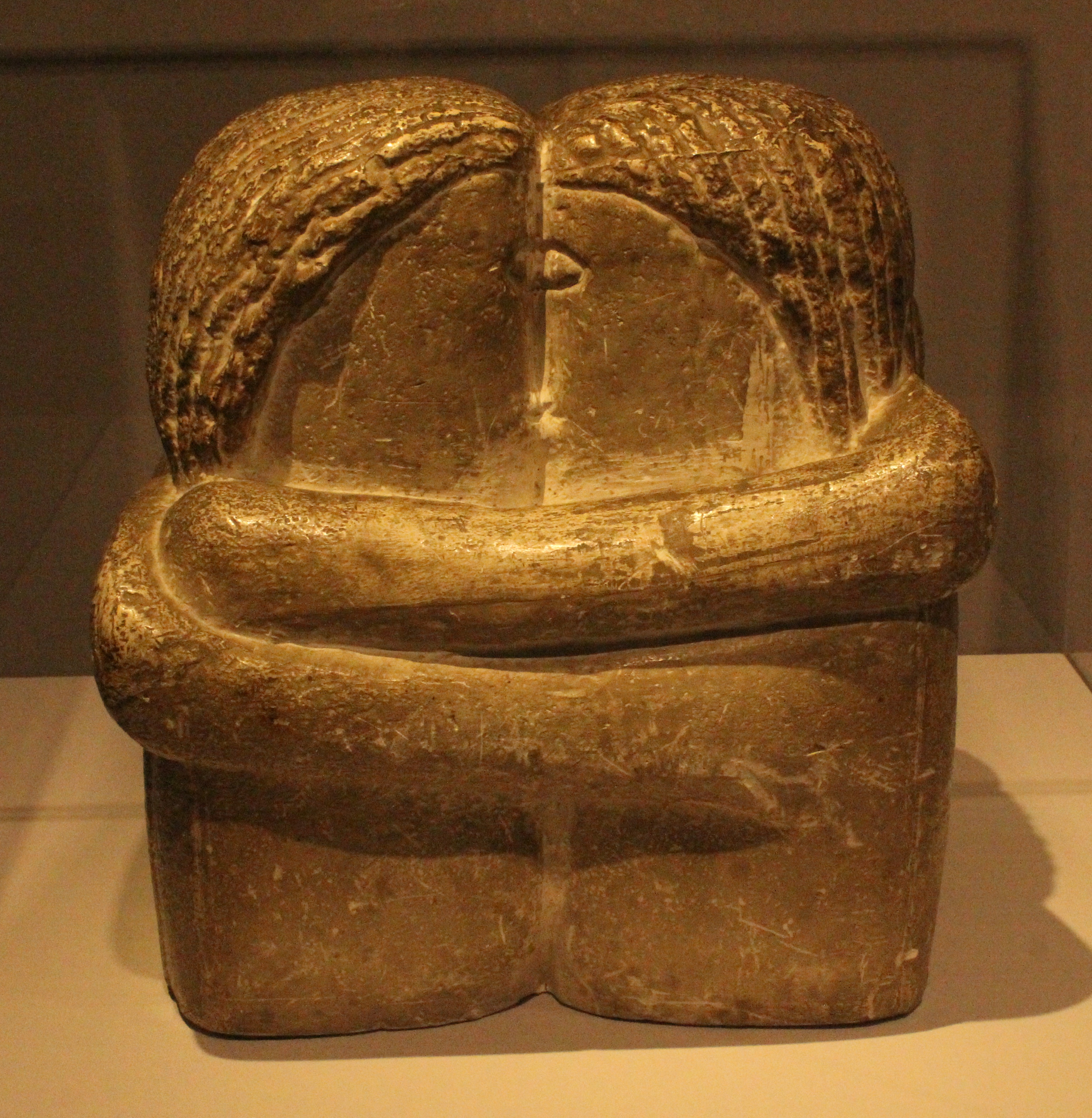
The Kiss, 1907–1908, plaster version

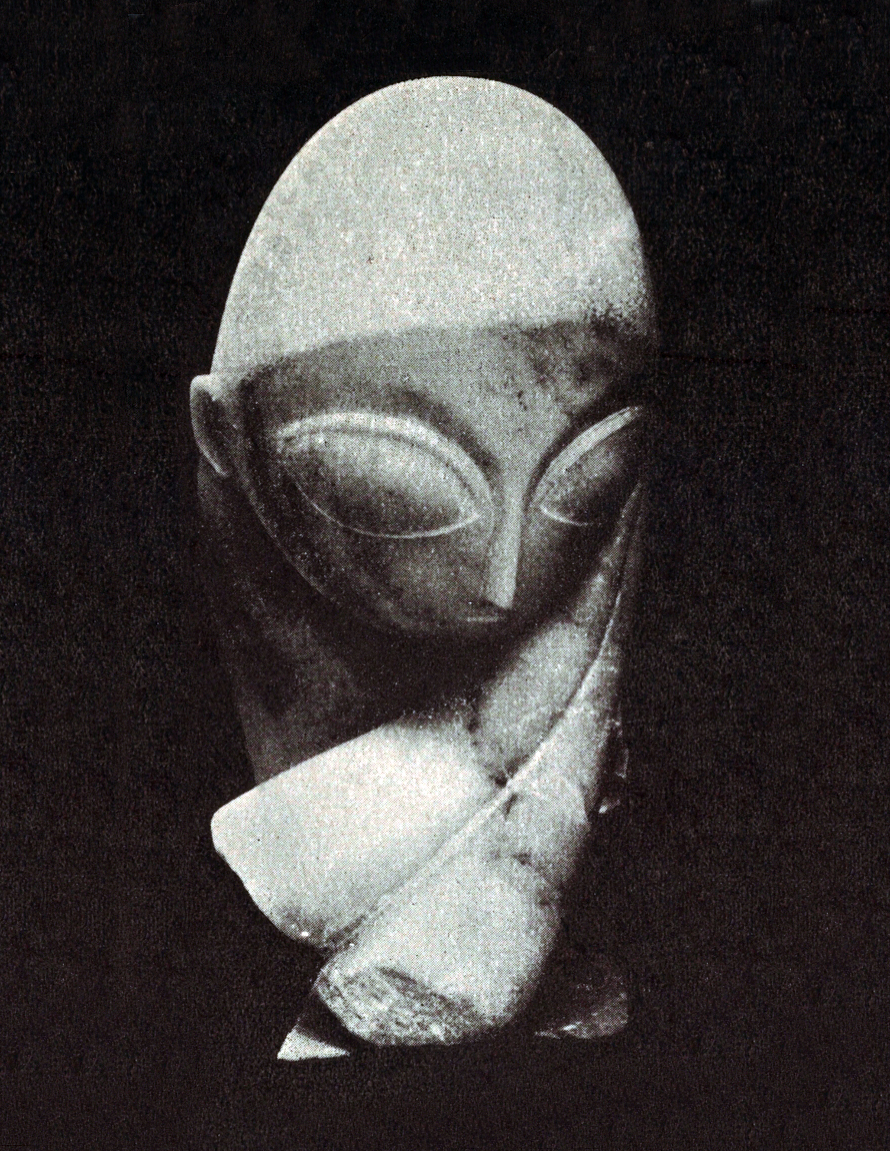
Portrait of Mlle Pogany, 1912, Philadelphia Museum of Art

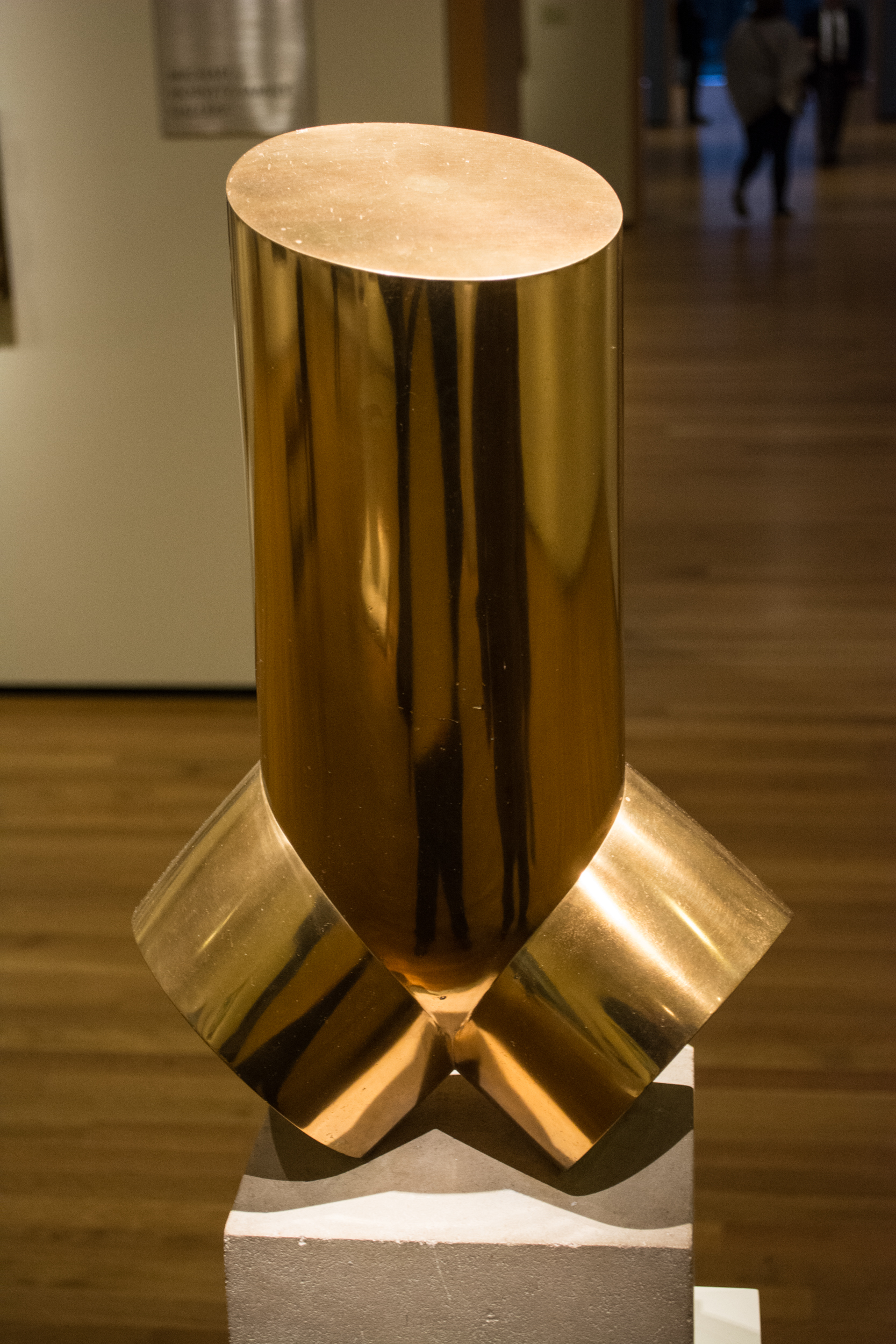
Male Torso, 1917, Cleveland Museum of Art

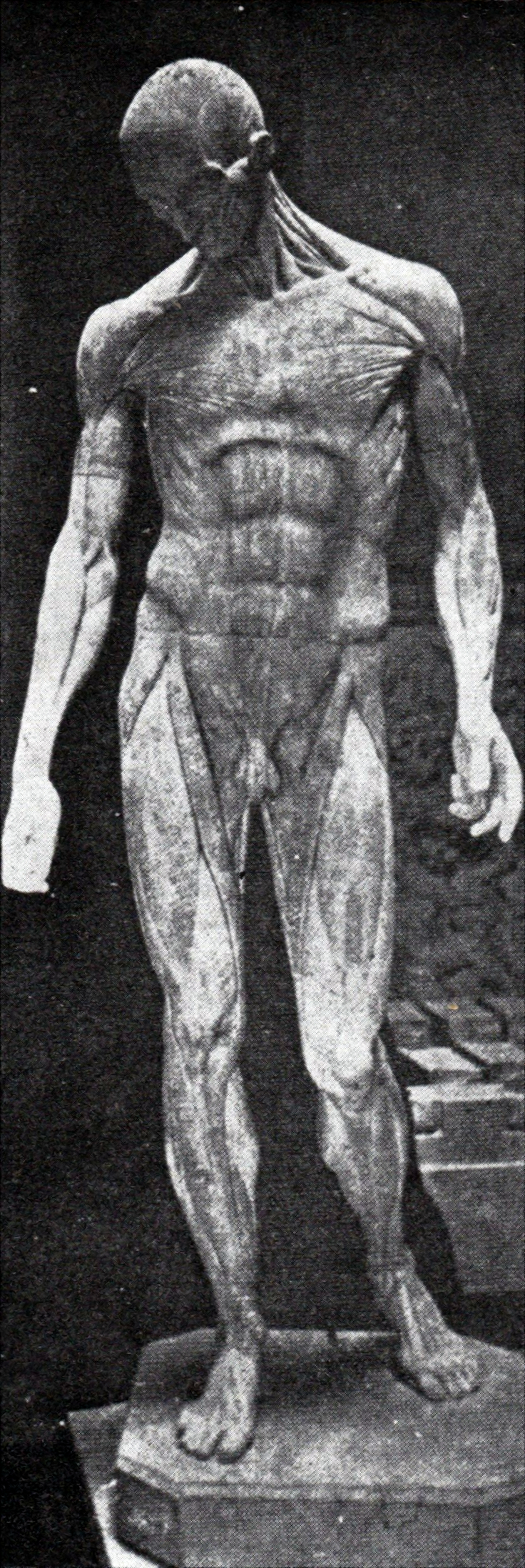
Écorché, 1902, front view

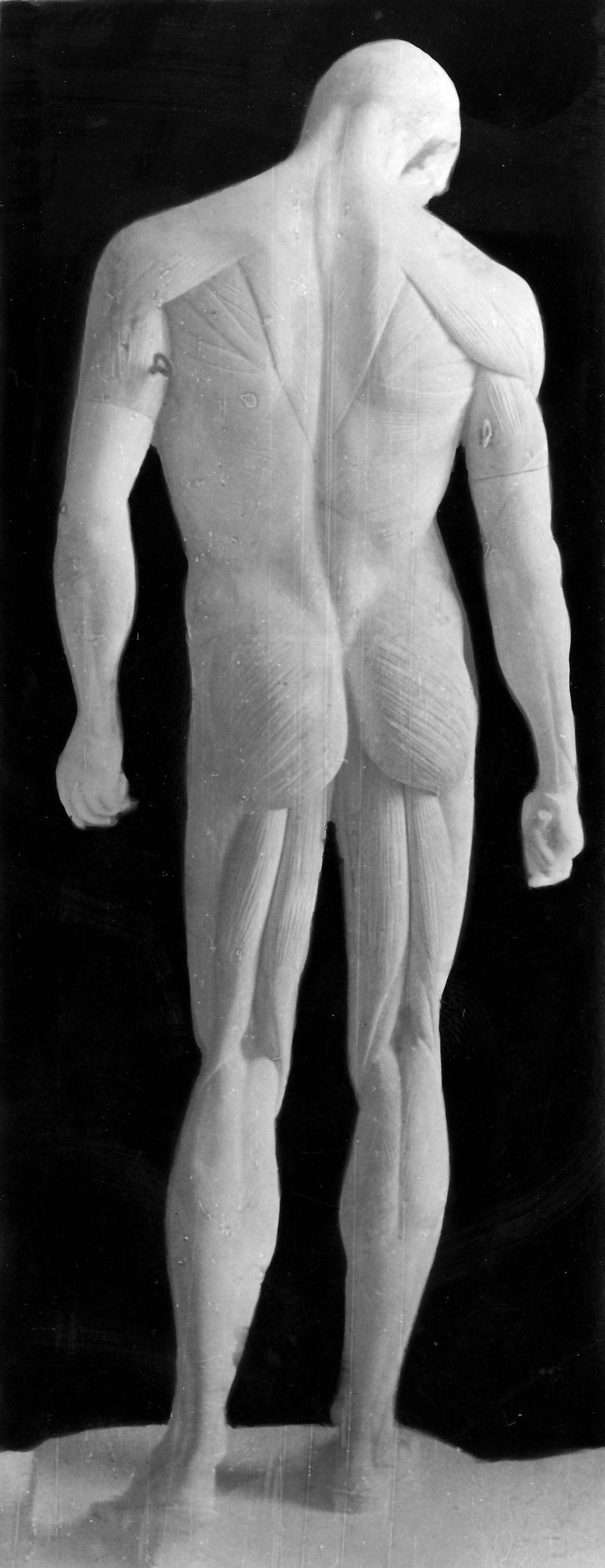
Écorché, 1902, rear view

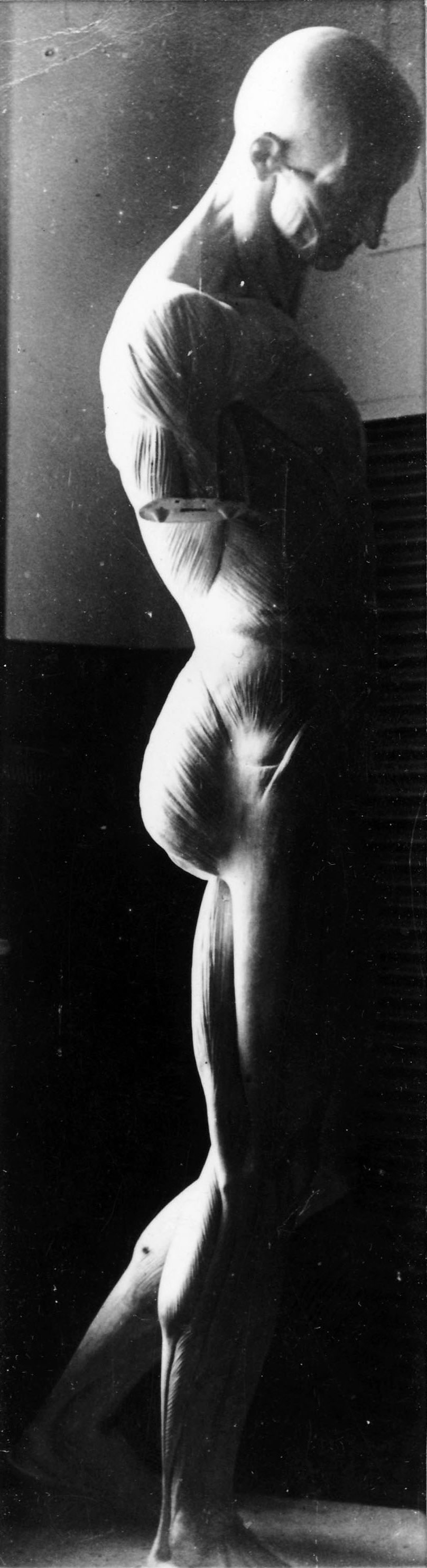
Écorché, 1902, side view

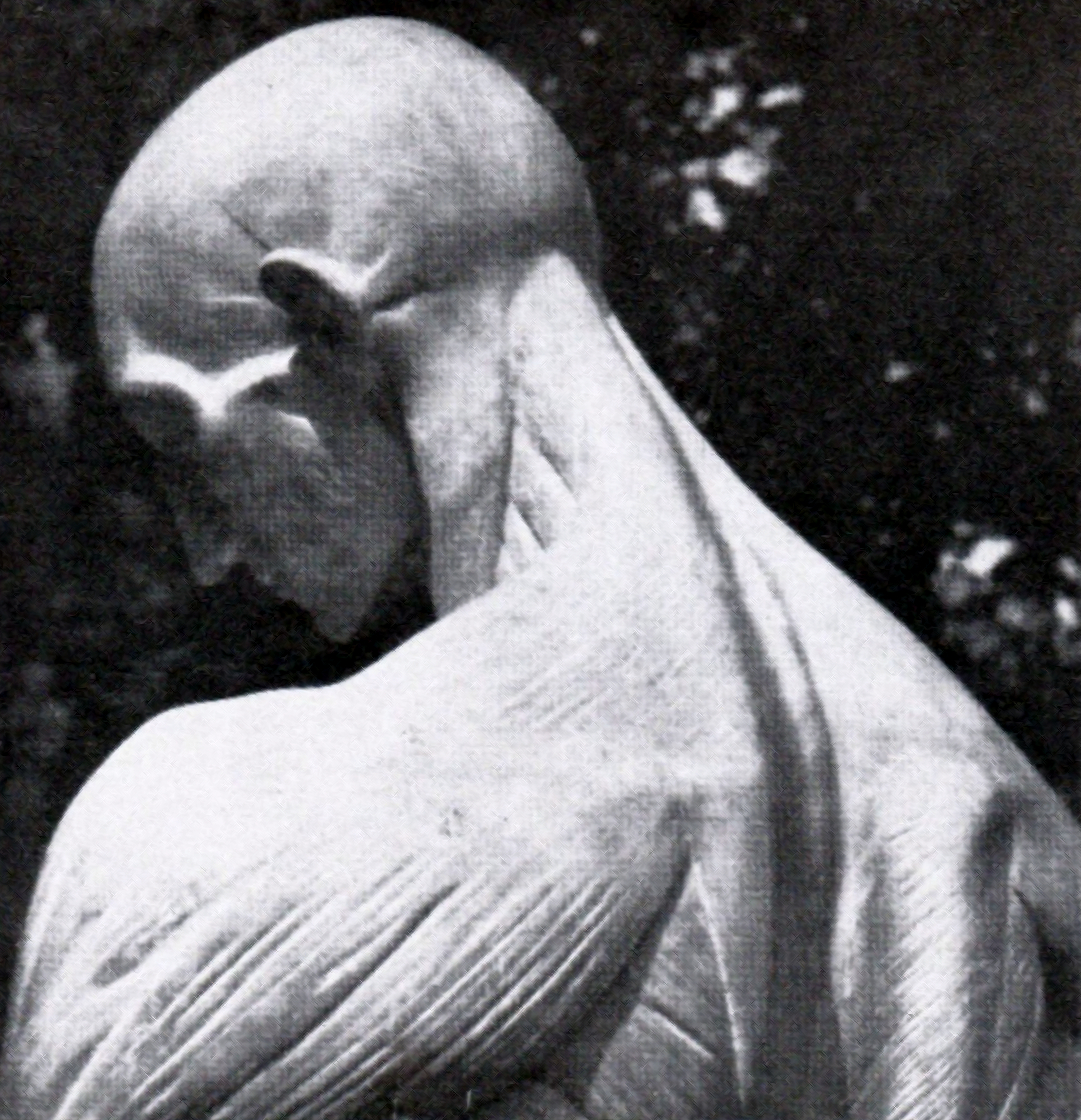
Écorché, 1902, detail of the head, neck, and torso

== Bibliography ==
- Adams, Laurie Schneider (2005). A History of Western Art (4th ed.). New York: McGraw-Hill. ISBN 978-0-07-310307-5.
- Bach, Friedrich Teja; Rowell, Margit; Temkin, Ann (1995). Constantin Brancusi, 1876–1957. Cambridge, Massachusetts: MIT Press. ISBN 978-0-262-02395-5.
- Chave, Anna C. (1993). Constantin Brancusi: Shifting the Bases of Art. New Haven, Connecticut: Yale University Press. ISBN 978-0-300-05526-9.
- Cristea, Simion Doru (2019). "O escultor Constantin Brâncusi e a consistência paremiológica da sua arte / The Sculptor Constantin Brâncusi and the Paremiological Consistence of His Art". In Soares, Rui J. B.; Lauhakangas, Outi (eds.). Proceedings of the Twelfth Interdisciplinary Colloquium on Proverbs, 4th to 11th November 2018, Tavira, Portugal. Tavira, Portugal: Tipografia Tavirense. pp. 252–282.
- Deac, Mircea (1966). Constantin Brancusi (in Romanian). Bucharest: Editura Meridiane.
- Faerna, José María (1997). Brancusi. Cameo. New York: Cameo/Abrams. ISBN 978-0-8109-4693-4.
- Geist, Sidney (1968). Brancusi: A Study of the Sculpture. New York: Grossman Publishers.
- Geist, Sidney (1975). Brancusi: The Sculpture and Drawings. New York: Harry N. Abrams. ISBN 978-0-8109-0124-7.
- Giedion-Welcker, Carola (1996). Brancusi als Fotograf: Ein Bildhauer fotografiert sein Werk (in German). Bern: Benteli. ISBN 978-3-7165-1048-3.
- Giménez, Carmen; Gale, Matthew, eds. (2004). Constantin Brancusi: The Essence of Things. London: Tate. ISBN 978-1-85437-495-0.
- Hultén, Pontus; Dumitresco, Natalia; Istrati, Alexandre (1986). Brancusi (in Italian). Milan: Mondadori.
- Hultén, Pontus; Dumitresco, Natalia; Istrati, Alexandre (1986). Brancusi (in German). Stuttgart: Klett-Cotta. ISBN 978-3-608-76226-6.
- Jianou, Ionel (1963). Brancusi. New York: Tudor Publishing Company.
- Lewis, David (1974). Constantin Brancusi. Modern Art Sculptors. London: Academy Editions. ISBN 978-0-85670-196-2.
- Miller, Sanda (2010). Constantin Brancusi. Critical Lives. London: Reaktion Books. ISBN 978-1-86189-652-0.
- Mola, Paola; Tabart, Marielle (2005). Brancusi: The White Work. Milan: Skira. ISBN 978-88-7624-170-3.
- Neutres, Jérôme (2013). Brancusi New York: 1913–2013. New York: Assouline. ISBN 978-1-61428-197-9.
- Richler, Martha (1998). National Gallery of Art, Washington: A World of Art. London: Scala Books. ISBN 978-1-85759-187-3.
- Sandqvist, Tom (2006). Dada East: The Romanians of Cabaret Voltaire. Cambridge, Massachusetts: MIT Press. ISBN 978-0-262-19507-2.
- Shanes, Eric (1989). Constantin Brancusi. Modern Masters. Vol. 12. New York: Abbeville Press. ISBN 978-0-89659-929-1.
- Tabart, Marielle; Lemny, Doïna; Nemo, Marie-Luce; Zucchelli-Charron, Anne-Marie (1997). La collection: L'Atelier Brancusi (in French). Paris: Éditions du Centre Pompidou. ISBN 978-2-85850-929-4.
- Umland, Anne, ed. (2026). Brancusi: The Artist and His Studio. New York: The Museum of Modern Art. ISBN 978-1-633-45197-1.
- Varia, Radu (1986). Brancusi. New York: Rizzoli. ISBN 978-0-8478-0673-7.
