= 2028 in public domain =

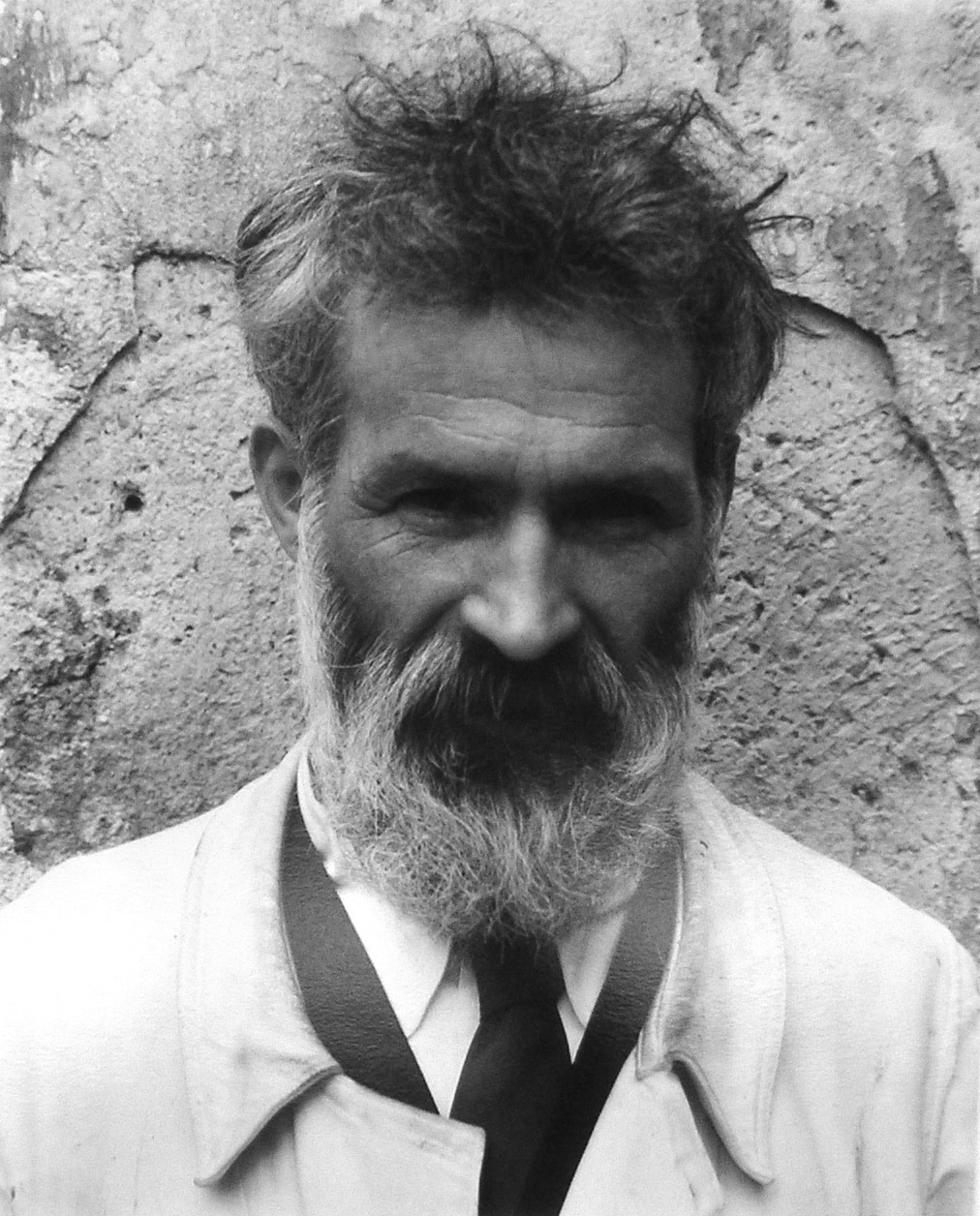
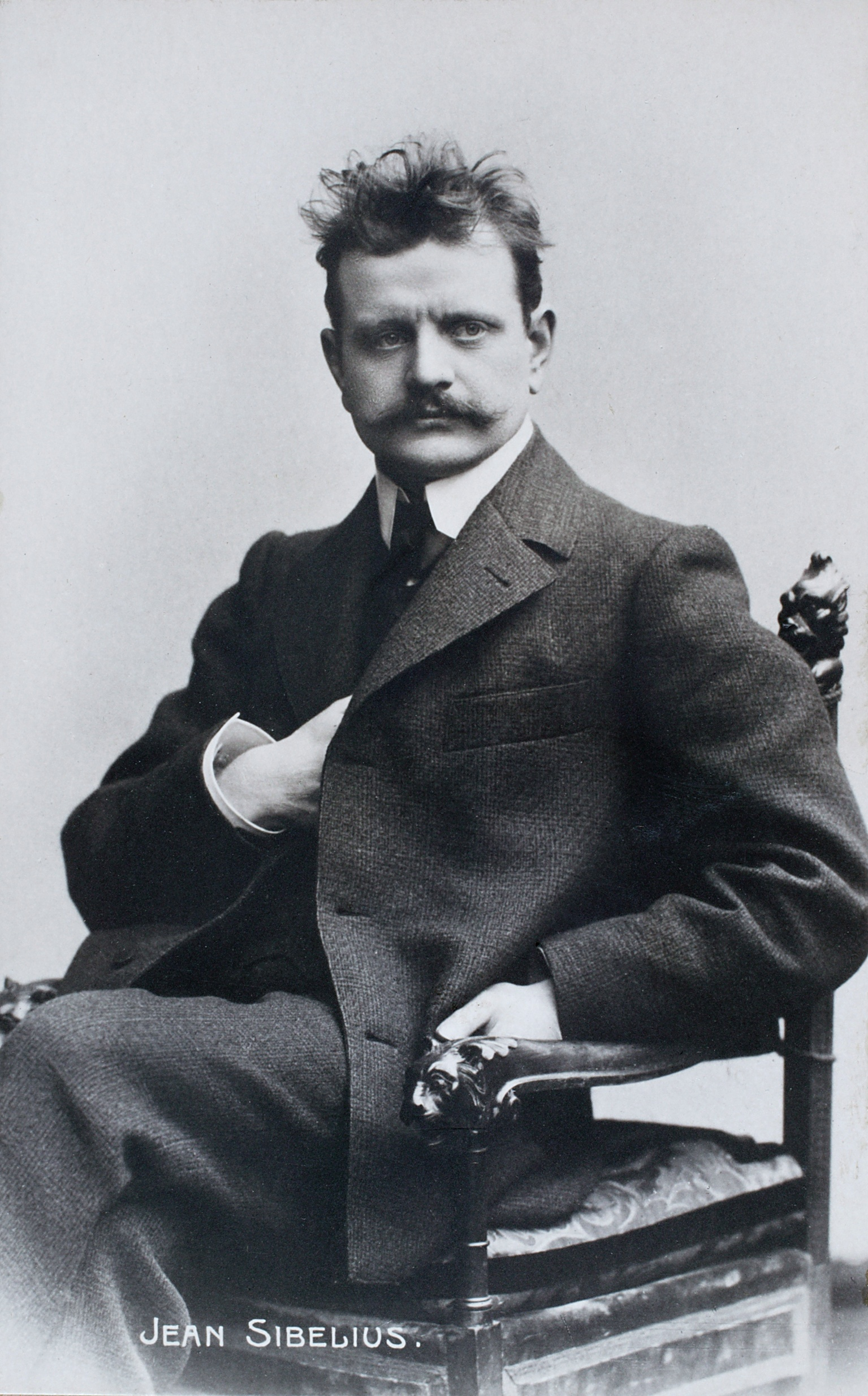
All sculptures by Constantin Brâncuși (left) and musical compositions by Jean Sibelius (right) will enter the public domain in Europe and Australia in 2028.

When a work's copyright expires, it enters the public domain. The following is a list of creators whose works enter the public domain in 2028. Since laws vary globally, the copyright status of some works is not uniform.

== Entering the public domain in countries with life + 70 years ==
With the exception of Belarus (Life + 50 years) and Spain (which has a copyright term of Life + 80 years for creators that died before 1988), a work enters the public domain in Europe 70 years after the creator's death, if it was published during the creator's lifetime. For previously unpublished material, those who publish it first will have the publication rights for 25 years. In addition, several other countries in the world have a limit of 70 years. The list is sorted alphabetically and includes a notable work of the creator.

Names	Country	Death	Occupation	Notable work
René Auberjonois	Switzerland	11 October 1957	Painter	
Constantin Brâncuși	Romania	16 March 1957	Sculptor	Sleeping Muse, Princess X, The Kiss, Torso of a Young Man, Bird in Space, Sculptural Ensemble at Târgu Jiu
Vitold Byalynitsky-Birulya	Russian Empire; Soviet Union	18 June 1957	Painter	landscape paintings
Alberto Casella	Italy	10 September 1957	Screenwriter	Filmography
André Chevrillon	France	9 July 1957	Writer	Publications
Freeman Wills Crofts	Ireland	11 April 1957	Novelist	Inspector French
Miguel Covarrubias	Mexico	4 February 1957	Painter, illustrator	
Alfred Döblin	Germany	26 June 1957	Writer	Berlin Alexanderplatz
Jérôme Doucet	France	1 February 1957	Writer	Works
Lord Dunsany	United Kingdom; Republic of Ireland	25 October 1957	Writer, Dramatist	The King of Elfland's Daughter
Virgilio Giotti	Italy	21 September 1957	Poet	Works
Oliver St. John Gogarty	Ireland	22 September 1957	Poet, novelist, playwright	"The Song of the Cheerful (but slightly Sarcastic) Jesus", Blight, As I Was Going Down Sackville Street
Heinrich Hoffman	Germany	16 December 1957	Photographer	
Léon Homo	France	16 August 1957	Historian	Works
Nikos Kazantzakis	Greece	26 October 1957	Writer	The Saviors of God, Captain Michalis, The Last Temptation of Christ, Zorba the Greek
Elizabeth Kingsley	United States	8 June 1957	Puzzle constructor	Double-crostic
František Kupka	Czech Republic	24 June 1957	Painter	The Cathedral (Katedrála)
Josef Lada	Czech Republic	14 December 1957	Painter, illustrator and writer	Kater Mikesch, illustrations for The Good Soldier Švejk
Curzio Malaparte	Italy	19 July 1957	Writer	Main writings
Mait Metsanurk	Estonia	21 August 1957	Writer	Ümera jõel
Blanche Odin	France	3 August 1957	Painter	
Charles Kay Ogden	United Kingdom	20 March 1957	Linguist, philosopher, and writer	Basic English: A General Introduction with Rules and Grammar
Max Ophüls	Germany; France	26 March 1957	Director and screenwriter	Letter from an Unknown Woman, The Earrings of Madame de...
Jože Plečnik	Slovenia	7 January 1957	Architect	Works
Diego Rivera	Mexico	24 November 1957	Painter	Man at the Crossroads
José Lins do Rego	Brazil	12 September 1957	Writer	Novels
William Runyan	United States	29 July 1957	Composer	Great is Thy Faithfulness
Umberto Saba	Italy	26 August 1957	Novelist	Works
Gaetano Salvemini	Italy	6 September 1957	Politician	Works
Albert Sammons	United Kingdom	24 August 1957	Composer	The Secret of Technique in Violin Playing
Dorothy Sayers	United Kingdom	17 December 1957	Writer, Translator, Poet, Editor	List of works by Dorothy L. Sayers
Jean Sibelius	Finland	20 September 1957	Composer	List of compositions by Jean Sibelius
Emilio Sierra	Colombia	8 March 1957	Composer	"Vivan los novios"
Jan Sluyters	Netherlands	8 May 1957	Painter	
J. Allen St. John	United States	23 May 1957	Writer, artist, illustrator	Illustrator of Edgar Rice Burroughs novels
Viktor Stretti	Czech Republic	3 March 1957	Etcher, lithographer and painter	
Georg Tappert	Germany	16 November 1957	Painter	
Henry van de Velde	Belgium	15 October 1957	Architect, painter and designer	Villa Bloemenwerf, Hohenhof
John von Neumann	Hungary; United States	8 February 1957	Mathematician, physicist, computer scientist	List of scientific publications by John von Neumann
Erich von Stroheim	Austria; United States	12 May 1957	Director	Greed
Laura Ingalls Wilder	United States	10 February 1957	Writer	Little House on the Prairie
James Whale	United Kingdom	29 May 1957	Director	Frankenstein, The Invisible Man, Bride of Frankenstein, Show Boat
Jack B. Yeats	Ireland	28 March 1957	Painter	A Horseman Enters a Town at Night, The Wild Ones, Reverie, The Liffey Swim

== Countries with life + 60 years ==
In Bangladesh, India, and Venezuela a work enters the public domain 60 years after the creator's death.

Names	Country	Death	Occupation	Notable work
J. R. Ackerley	United Kingdom	4 June 1967	Writer, editor	My Dog Tulip, We Think the World of You
Ciro Alegría	Peru	17 February 1967	Journalist, novelist	El mundo es ancho y ajeno
Gordon Allport	United States	9 October 1967	psychologist	Becoming: Basic Considerations for a Psychology of Personality
Norman Angell	United Kingdom	7 October 1967	journalist, author, politician	The Great Illusion
Tudor Arghezi	Romania	14 July 1967	poet, novelist, essayist	Cuvinte Potrivite, Zdreanță
Marcel Aymé	France	14 October 1967	Novelist, children's writer, playwright	The passer-through-walls
Margaret Ayer Barnes	United States	25 October 1967	playwright, novelist, short-story writer	Years of Grace
Vladimir Bartol	Slovenia	12 September 1967	Writer	Alamut
Frank Bruno	New Zealand	12 July 1967	Writer, cartoonist, boxer	Black Noon at Ngutu, The Hellbuster
John Coltrane	United States	17 July 1967	Saxophonist, composer	Giant Steps
Isaac Deutscher	United Kingdom	19 August 1967	Biographer	Stalin: a Political Biography
Julien Duvivier	France	29 October 1967	film director, screenwriter	Sous le ciel de Paris
Ilya Ehrenburg	Russia	31 August 1967	writer, journalist, translator	Black Book, The Thaw
Sidney Bradshaw Fay	United States	29 August 1967	Historian	The Origins of the World War
Varian Fry	United States	13 September 1967	Journalist	The Peace that Failed, Surrender on Demand
Hein Gorny	Germany	14 June 1967	Photographer	Collection at Deutsche Fotothek
Che Guevara	Argentina; Cuba	9 October 1967	Communist revolutionary, author	Guerrilla Warfare
Robert van Gulik	Netherlands	24 September 1967	writer, diplomat, translator	The Chinese Maze Murders
Woody Guthrie	United States	3 October 1967	singer-songwriter	This Land Is Your Land
Edward Hopper	United States	15 May 1967	Painter	Nighthawks
Langston Hughes	United States	22 May 1967	Writer	The Weary Blues
Lajos Kassák	Hungary	22 July 1967	Poet, writer, painter	
Margaret Kennedy	United Kingdom	31 July 1967	Novelist, playwright	The Constant Nymph, Troy Chimneys
Joseph Kesselring	United States	5 November 1967	playwright	Arsenic and Old Lace
Zoltán Kodály	Hungary	6 March 1967	Composer, philosopher, ethnomusicologist	Psalmus Hungaricus
Wolfgang Köhler	Germany	11 June 1967	Psychologist	The Mentality of Apes, Gestalt Psychology
Josefina Lerena Acevedo de Blixen	Uruguay	12 November 1967	Writer, journalist	Reyles
Douglas MacLean	United States	9 July 1967	actor, writer	Mama Loves Papa
René Magritte	Belgium	15 August 1967	Painter	The Difficult Crossing, The Treachery of Images
John Masefield	United Kingdom	12 May 1967	Poet, novelist	The Everlasting Mercy, Sea-Fever
André Maurois	France	9 October 1967	author	The Silence of Colonel Bramble
Carson McCullers	United States	29 September 1967	Novelist, playwright, poet	The Heart Is a Lonely Hunter, The Member of the Wedding
Edgar Neville	Spain	23 April 1967	playwright, film director	
Christopher Okigbo	Nigeria	September 1967	Writer	
J. Robert Oppenheimer	United States	18 February 1967	Physicist, professor	
Joe Orton	United Kingdom	9 August 1967	Playwright	The Ruffian on the Stair, Entertaining Mr Sloane
Dorothy Parker	United States	7 June 1967	Writer	Enough Rope
Violeta Parra	Chile	5 February 1967	Composer, songwriter	Gracias a la Vida
Arthur Ransome	United Kingdom	3 June 1967	Writer, journalist	Swallows and Amazons series
Otis Redding	United States	10 December 1967	Singer, songwriter	Respect
Elmer Rice	United States	8 May 1967	playwright	The Adding Machine, Street Scene
Gerhard Ritter	Germany	1 July 1967	Historian	Luther: Gestalt und Symbol
José Martínez Ruiz	Spain	2 March 1967	Novelist, essayist, literary critic	La ruta de Don Quijote, La voluntad, Antonio Azorín
Carl Sandburg	United States	22 July 1967	Poet, writer, journalist	Abraham Lincoln: The War Years, Chicago Poems
Siegfried Sassoon	United Kingdom	1 September 1967	poet, soldier, writer	Memoirs of a Fox-Hunting Man
Philippa Schuyler	United States	9 May 1967	Journalist, pianist	Adventures in Black and White
Walter Terence Stace	United Kingdom	2 August 1967	Philosopher, academic,	Mysticism and Philosophy
Billy Strayhorn	United States	31 May 1967	Composer, lyricist	Take the "A" Train, Lush Life
Jean Toomer	United States	30 March 1967	Poet, novelist	Cane
Pavlo Tychyna	Ukraine	16 September 1967	Poet, statesman	
Paul Whiteman	United States	29 December 1967	Bandleader, composer	Flamin' Mamie
Ossip Zadkine	France	25 November 1967	Artist	The Destroyed City
Wolfgang Zeller	Germany	11 January 1967	Composer	
João Guimarães Rosa	Brazil	19 November 1967	Writer	Sagarana

== Countries with life + 50 years ==
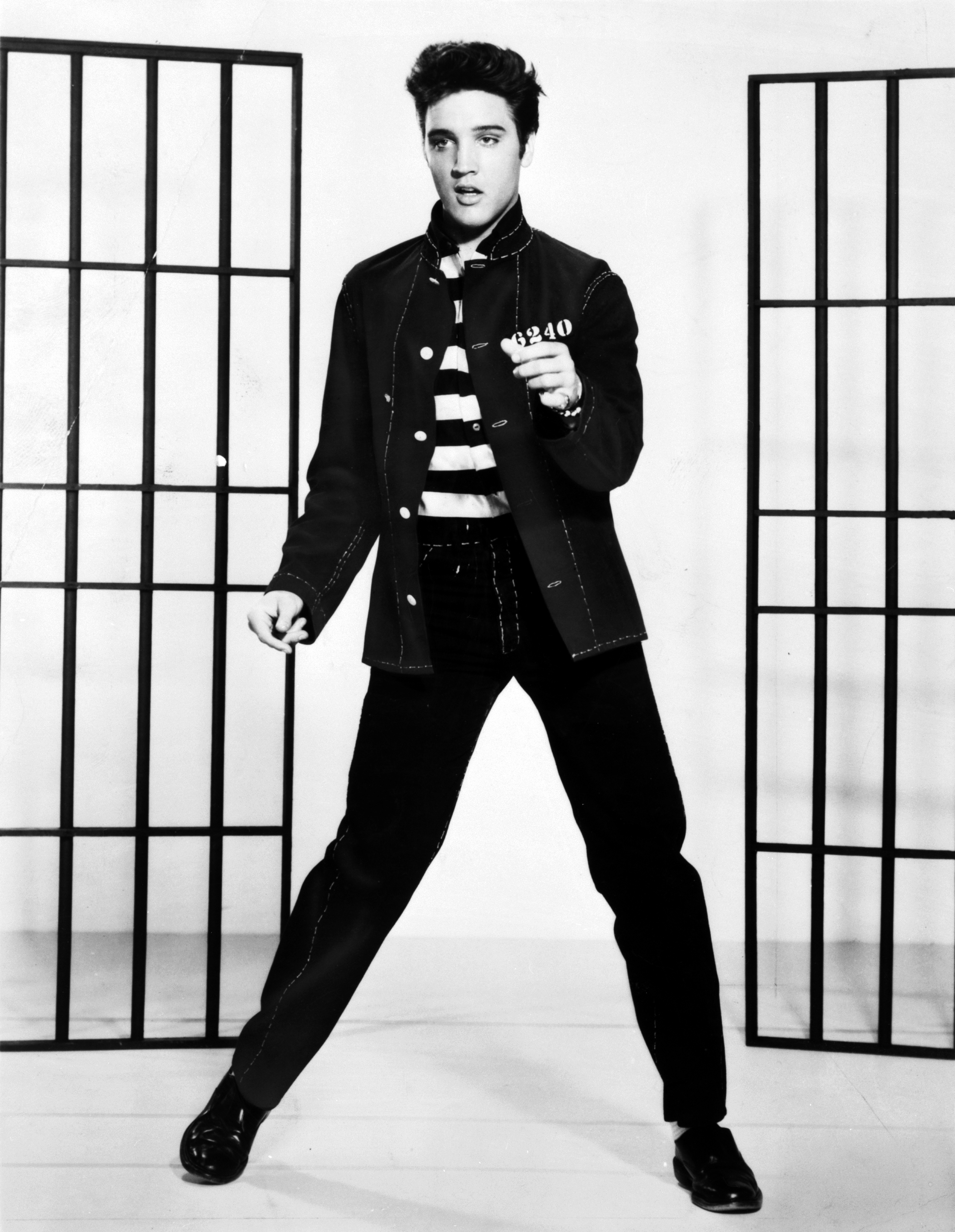
All of Elvis Presley's songs will enter the public domain in most of Africa and Asia in 2028.

In most countries of Africa and Asia, as well as Belarus, Bolivia, New Zealand, and Egypt, a work enters the public domain 50 years after the creator's death.

Names	Country	Death	Occupation	Notable work
María Esther Ballivián	Bolivia	23 June 1977	Artist	Naturaleza muerta
Francisco Cristancho Camargo	Colombia	9 February 1977	Composer, musician	"Bochica"
Charlie Chaplin	United Kingdom; United States; Switzerland	25 December 1977	Actor, director	Filmography
Margaret Escott	New Zealand	15 August 1977	Author	Show Down
Edmond Hamilton	United States	1 February 1977	Author	Captain Future
H. H. Hollis	United States	1977	SF Author	"The Guerrilla Trees"
Groucho Marx	United States	19 August 1977	Actor and comedian	An Evening with Groucho
Vladimir Nabokov	Russia	2 July 1977	Author	Lolita
Anaïs Nin	France	14 January 1977	Author	Delta of Venus
Peruchín	Cuba	24 December 1977	Pianist	
Elvis Presley	United States	16 August 1977	Musician	Jailhouse Rock
Pedro Antonio Ramos	Venezuela	1 May 1977	Composer, bassoonist	"Himno a José María Carreño"
Oriol Rangel	Colombia	14 January 1977	Composer, musician	"Pamplona"
H. A. Rey	Germany	26 August 1977	Author	Curious George
Dennis Wheatley	United Kingdom	10 November 1977	Author	The Devil Rides Out

== Countries with life + 80 years ==
Spain has a copyright term of life + 80 years for creators that died before 1988. In Colombia and Equatorial Guinea, a work enters the public domain 80 years after the creator's death.

Names	Country	Death	Occupation	Notable work
James Agate	United Kingdom	6 June 1947	Writer, critic	Ego
Tilly Aston	Australia	1 November 1947	Educator, writer	
Joseph Barcroft	United Kingdom	21 March 1947	Physiologist	The Respiratory Function of the Blood
W. Augustus Barratt	United States	12 April 1947	Composer	Sir Patrick Spens
Marie Adelaide Belloc Lowndes	United Kingdom	14 November 1947	Novelist	The Lodger
J. D. Beresford	United Kingdom	1 February 1947	Science fiction and horror author	The Hampdenshire Wonder
Augustin Bernard	France	29 December 1947	Geographer	Les Confins algéro-marocains
Tristan Bernard	France	7 December 1947	Playwright	Mémoires d'un jeune homme rangé
Jean-Richard Bloch	France	15 March 1947	Writer	
Luigi Bonelli	Italy	26 January 1947	Orientalist	Lessico italiano-turco
Pierre Bonnard	France	23 January 1947	Painter, printmaker	
Wolfgang Borchert	Germany	20 November 1947	Playwright	Draußen vor der Tür
Angela Brazil	United Kingdom	13 March 1947	Children's books author	
Óscar Castro Zúñiga	Chile	1 October 1947	Writer	Llampo de Sangre, Camino en el alba, Comarca del jazmín
Willa Cather	United States	24 April 1947	Writer	My Ántonia
Dmitry Censor	Russia	26 December 1947	Poet	
George Chatterton-Hill	Ireland	12 January 1947	Philosopher	Heredity and Selection in Sociology
Édouard Chatton	France	23 April 1947	Biologist	
Winston Churchill	United States	12 March 1947	Novelist	The Celebrity
Ananda Coomaraswamy	United States	9 September 1947	historian, philosopher	The Dance of Shiva
Aleister Crowley	United Kingdom	1 December 1947	Poet	Bibliography
Franz Cumont	Belgium	20 August 1947	archeologist	Texts and Illustrated Monuments Relating to the Mysteries of Mithra
Petras Cvirka	Lithuania	2 May 1947	Author	Frank Kruk
Josef Čapek	Czech Republic	April 1945 (Note: Josef Čapek's remains were never found. In 1948 the court officially set the date of his death, the day which he did not survive being 30 April 1947. See here:)	Painter, writer	All About Doggie and Pussycat
Anton Denikin	Russia	8 August 1947	Soldier, writer	Russian Turmoil
Walter Donaldson	United States	15 July 1947	Songwriter	Makin' Whoopee, Yes Sir, That's My Baby
Hans Fallada	Germany	5 February 1947	Writer	Der junge Goedeschal, Little Man, What Now?
Irving Fisher	United States	29 April 1947	Economist	The Purchasing Power of Money
Desmond FitzGerald	Ireland	9 April 1947	Architect	
Henry Ford	United States	7 April 1947	Business magnate	The International Jew
John Ulrich Giesy	United States	8 September 1947	Writer, physician	Palos of the Dog Star Pack
Victor Goldschmidt	Norway	20 March 1947	Mineralogist	Geochemische Verteilungsgesetze der Elemente
Reynaldo Hahn	France	28 January 1947	Composer	Ciboulette
G. H. Hardy	United Kingdom	1 December 1947	Mathematician	A Mathematician's Apology
Frank Heller	Sweden	14 October 1947	Writer	The London Adventures of Mr. Collin
Frederick Gowland Hopkins	United Kingdom	16 May 1947	Biochemist	Feeding experiments illustrating the importance of accessory factors in normal dietaries
Blanche Hoschedé Monet	France	8 December 1947	Painter	
Victor Horta	Belgium	9 August 1947	Architect	
Albert Howard	United Kingdom	20 October 1947	Botanist	An Agricultural Testament
Ricarda Huch	Germany	17 November 1947	Author	The Deruga Case
Stanislav Hudeček	Czech Republic	15 April 1947	Painter and illustrator	
E.M. Hull	United Kingdom	11 February 1947	Novelist	The Sheik
Pierre Janet	France	24 February 1947	Psychologist	La médecine psychologique
Afevork Ghevre Jesus	Ethiopia	25 September 1947	Writer	Ləbb Wälläd Tarik
Elizabeth Jordan	United States	24 February 1947	Journalist, suffragist, author	
Pyotr Krasnov	Russia	17 January 1947	Soldier, writer	From Double Eagle To the Red Flag
Karel Langer	Czech Republic	2 May 1947	Painter	
Richard Le Gallienne	United Kingdom	15 September 1947	author, poet	
C. Louis Leipoldt	South Africa	12 April 1947	Poet	
Philipp Lenard	Germany	20 May 1947	Physicist	Quantitative on cathode rays
Friedrich von Lerch	Austria	19 December 1947	Physicist	Separation of radium C from radium E
Hugh Lofting	United Kingdom	26 September 1947	Writer	Doctor Dolittle series
Ernst Lubitsch	Germany	30 November 1947	Director	
Manuel Machado	Spain	19 January 1947	Poet and playwright	La Lola se va a los puertos
Arthur Machen	United Kingdom	15 December 1947	Fantasy and horror author	The Great God Pan, The Three Impostors, The Hill of Dreams, The White People
Karl Mannheim	United Kingdom	9 January 1947	Sociologist	Ideology and Utopia
Henri Manuel	France	11 September 1947	Photographer	
William Moulton Marston	United States	2 May 1947	Psychologist, inventor, comic book writer	Wonder Woman, DISC assessment
Anatole de Monzie	France	11 January 1947	Encyclopaedist	Grandeur et servitude judiciaires
Yone Noguchi	Japan	13 July 1947	Writer	The American Diary of a Japanese Girl
Emma Orczy	United Kingdom	12 November 1947	Novelist, Playwright	The Scarlet Pimpernel
P. D. Ouspensky	Russia	2 October 1947	Mathematician, esotericist	
Friedrich Paschen	Germany	25 February 1947	Physicist	Ueber die zum Funkenübergang in Luft, Wasserstoff und Kohlensäure bei verschiedenen Drucken erforderliche Potentialdifferenz
John Henry Patterson	United Kingdom	18 June 1947	Soldier, hunter, author	The Man-Eaters of Tsavo
Reginald Payne	United Kingdom	20 December 1947	Illustrator	The Railway Series
Júlio Afrânio Peixoto	Brazil	12 January 1947	Writer	
Max Planck	Germany	4 October 1947	Scientist	
R. I. Pocock	United Kingdom	9 August 1947	Zoologist	The Fauna of British India
Carl Adolph Preyer	United States	16 November 1947	Composer	Festal Polonaise, Op.14
Charles-Ferdinand Ramuz	Switzerland	23 May 1947	Author	Beauty on Earth
Forrest Reid	United Kingdom	4 January 1947	Novelist	Young Tom
Nicholas Roerich	Russia; India	13 December 1947	Painter, writer	
Borys Romanowski	Georgia	1947	Polish painter active in Georgia	
Margaret Marshall Saunders	Canada	15 February 1947	Writer	
Johannes Schubert	Austria	29 September 1947	Physicist	
Emil Schovánek	Czech Republic	11 July 1947	Painter	
Alexander Scott	United Kingdom	10 March 1947	Chemist	An Introduction to Chemical Theory
Kathleen Scott	United Kingdom	25 July 1947	Sculptor	
Victor Serge	Belgium	17 November 1947	Marxist revolutionary, writer	From Lenin to Stalin, Destiny of a Revolution
M. P. Shiel	Montserrat	17 February 1947	Horror and science fiction author	The Purple Cloud, The Yellow Danger
Andrei Shkuro	Russia	17 January 1947	Soldier, memoirist	
Alfred Walter Stewart	United Kingdom	1 July 1947	Chemist, Writer	Nordenholt's Million
Alan Sullivan	Canada	6 August 1947	Writer	The Great Divide
Flora Thompson	United Kingdom	21 May 1947	Novelist, poet	Lark Rise to Candleford
Mstislav Tsyavlovsky	Russia; USSR	11 November 1947	Literary scholar	
Jim Tully	United States	22 June 1947	Writer	Beggars of Life
Marcel Varnel	France	13 July 1947	Film Director	
E. C. Vivian	United Kingdom	21 May 1947	Writer, editor	Fields of Sleep
Sidney Webb	United Kingdom	13 October 1947		
Alfred North Whitehead	United Kingdom	30 December 1947	Mathematician	Process and Reality
Anna Wickham	United Kingdom	30 April 1947	Poet	Songs of John Oland
Émile Auguste Joseph De Wildeman	Belgium	24 July 1947	Botanist	
Almroth Wright	United Kingdom	30 April 1947	Bacteriologist	The Unexpurgated Case Against Woman Suffrage
Riichi Yokomitsu	Japan	30 December 1947	Writer	
Eduard von Zambaur	Austria	10 October 1947	Orientalist	Die Münzprägungen des Islams

== United States ==
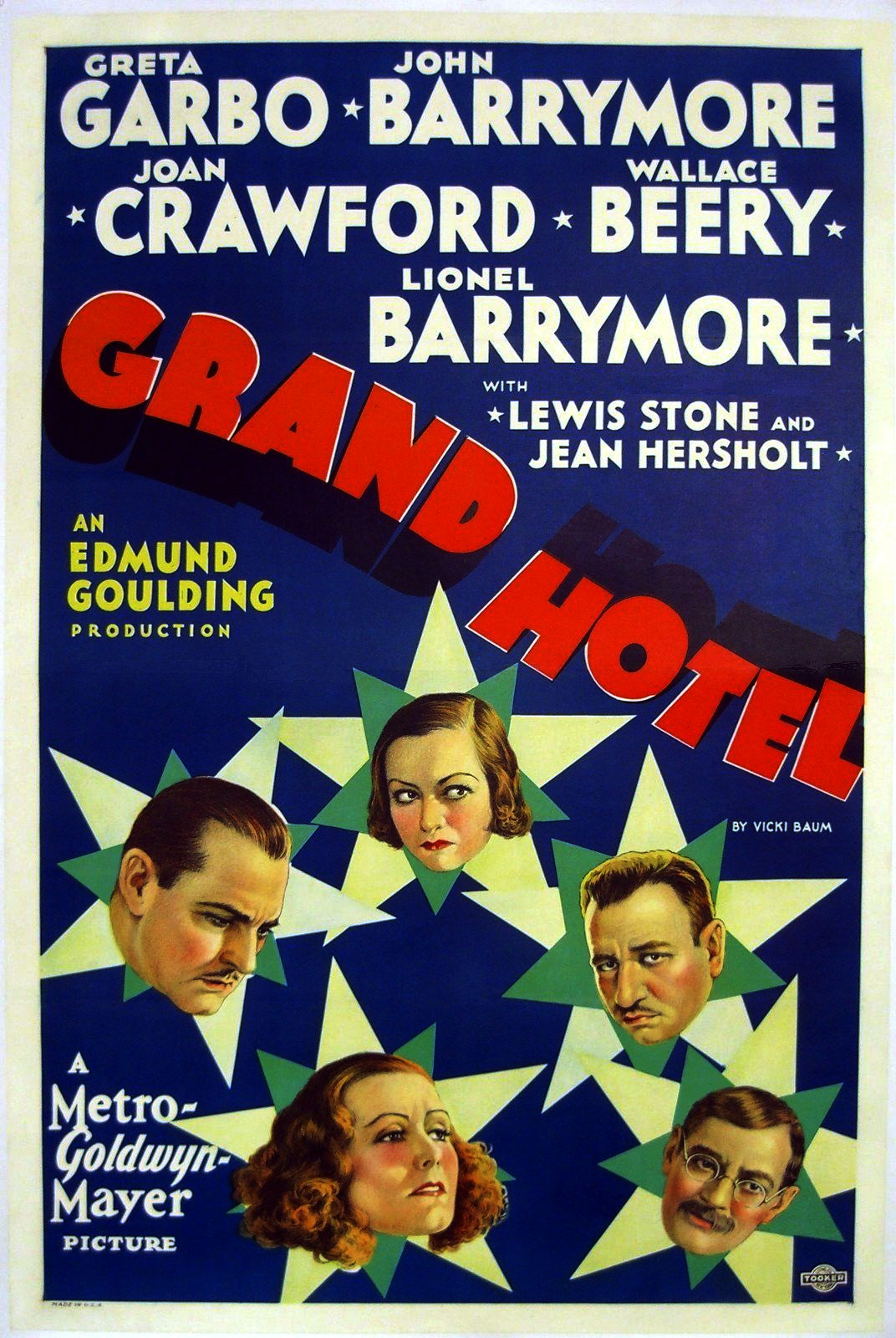
MGM's Grand Hotel, the fifth Best Picture Academy Award winner, will enter the U.S. public domain in 2028.

Under the Copyright Term Extension Act, books published in 1932, films released in 1932, and other works published in 1932 will enter the public domain in 2028. Sound recordings that were published in 1927 and unpublished works whose authors died in 1957 will also enter the public domain.

Among the films that will enter the public domain in 2028 are the original Scarface, Universal Monsters film The Mummy with Boris Karloff, Tarzan the Ape Man with Johnny Weissmuller, Best Picture Academy Award-winner Grand Hotel, Josef von Sternberg's Shanghai Express with Marlene Dietrich, Ernst Lubitsch's Trouble in Paradise, The Music Box starring Stan Laurel and Oliver Hardy, Katharine Hepburn's film debut A Bill of Divorcement, Shirley Temple's film debut The Red-Haired Alibi, the earliest Looney Tunes short films that were still under copyright when the Copyright Renewal Act of 1992 was implemented such as Ride Him, Bosko!, Horse Feathers with the Marx Brothers, Tod Browning's Freaks, Carl Theodor Dreyer's Vampyr, Alfred Hitchcock's Number Seventeen, the John Ford films Air Mail and Flesh (the latter of which was co-written by William Faulkner), Alexander Korda's The Golden Anchor (a German-language version of Korda's 1931 film Marius), Frank Capra films Forbidden and American Madness, Jean Renoir's Boudu Saved from Drowning, Marc Allégret's Fanny, Yasujirō Ozu's I Was Born, But..., the first Mexican sound film Santa, the first Egyptian sound film Sons of Aristocrats, the first Marathi language sound film and oldest surviving Indian film Ayodhyecha Raja, and Walt Disney's Mickey Mouse and Silly Symphony cartoons released in 1932, including Flowers and Trees (the first cartoon produced in Technicolor) and Mickey's Revue with the first appearance of Dippy Dawg, the character who would later become Goofy.

Examples of important literary works entering the public domain include Aldous Huxley's Brave New World, William Faulkner's Light in August, Samuel Becket's Dream of Fair to Middling Women, Graham Greene's Stamboul Train, Ernest Hemingway's Death in the Afternoon, Noël Coward's play Cavalcade (first performed in 1931 but not published until 1932), Zelda Fitzgerald's Save Me the Waltz, John Steinbeck's The Pastures of Heaven, Agatha Christie's Hercule Poirot detective novel Peril at End House, T. S. Eliot's unfinished work Sweeney Agonistes, John Dos Passos's Nineteen Nineteen, Laura Ingalls Wilder's Little House in the Big Woods, the Hardy Boys novel While the Clock Ticked, the Nancy Drew Mystery Stories The Clue in the Diary (introducing Nancy's love interest Ned Nickerson) and Nancy's Mysterious Letter, the first three volumes of Mikhail Sholokhov's And Quiet Flows the Don in the original Russian, the full album version of Herge's Tintin in America and the first serialized pages of Cigars of the Pharaoh (originally titled Tintin in the Orient, and introducing the earliest incarnations of the villain Rastapopoulos and the twin detectives Thomson and Thompson (Note: Originally named "X33" and "X33 bis", and later known in the series' origin language as Dupont and Dupond.)) in their original French unedited black-and-white versions, W. E. Johns’ first Biggles collection The Camels Are Coming, and the first editions of literary magazine Scrutiny. Nazi propaganda content will also begin entering the American public domain in the original German in 2028, with Der Hitlerjunge Quex, a novel about the Hitler Youth.

Works from 1932 that were already in the public domain for lacking proper copyright renewal or bearing invalid notices include the 1932 strips of E. C. Segar's Thimble Theatre with the first appearances of the villain Bluto and recurring character George W. Geezil as well as a more refined iteration of Popeye that closer resembles his modern depiction, the first merchandise of Winnie-the-Pooh to have him wearing the red shirt that would much later be popularized by the Disney version of the character, the novelization of King Kong (the public domain status of which was confirmed in the 1970s lawsuit Universal v. RKO), the first comic strips of Pete the Tramp, and Robert E. Howard's first Conan the Barbarian short story The Phoenix on the Sword.

Important artworks entering the public domain include Pablo Picasso's Nude in a Black Armchair and Nude, Green Leaves and Bust, Oskar Schlemmer's painting Bauhaus Stairway, Otto Dix's triptych The War, Henri Matisse's mural The Dance II, David Alfaro Siqueiros' fresco América Tropical, Diego Rivera's Detroit Industry Murals, Alberto Giacometti's sculpture The Palace at 4 a.m., Man Ray's photograph Larmes, and some of the earliest professional photographs of Henri Cartier-Bresson including Behind the Gare Saint-Lazare and Hyères, France. The Q4 1932 editions of The Times of London, with the first applications and earliest version of the font Times New Roman, will also enter the American public domain.

Among the better-known songs entering the public domain are "Try a Little Tenderness", "It Don't Mean a Thing (If It Ain't Got That Swing)" and "Love Is the Sweetest Thing". Jimmy Kennedy's lyrical adaptation of Teddy Bears' Picnic will also become public domain in the United States in 2028.

== See also ==
- List of American films of 1932
- 1932 in literature
- 1932 in music
- 1957 in literature and 1977 in literature for deaths of writers
- Public Domain Day
- Creative Commons
- 2029 in public domain
