= 2018 in public domain =

When a work's copyright expires, it enters the public domain. The following is a list of works that entered the public domain in 2018. Since laws vary globally, the copyright status of some works are not uniform.

== Entering the public domain in countries with life + 70 years ==
With the exception of Belarus and Spain (which is Life + 80 for creators who died before 1987), a work enters the public domain in Europe 70 years after the creator's death, if it was published during the creator's lifetime. The list is sorted alphabetically and includes a notable work of the creator that entered the public domain on January 1, 2018. For previously unpublished material, those who publish it first will have the publication rights for 25 years.

Names	Country	Death	Occupation	Notable work
James Agate	United Kingdom	6 June 1947	Writer, critic	Ego
Tilly Aston	Australia	1 November 1947	Educator, writer	
Joseph Barcroft	United Kingdom	21 March 1947	Physiologist	The Respiratory Function of the Blood
W. Augustus Barratt	United States	12 April 1947	Composer	Sir Patrick Spens
Marie Adelaide Belloc Lowndes	United Kingdom	14 November 1947	Novelist	The Lodger
J. D. Beresford	United Kingdom	1 February 1947	Science fiction and horror author	The Hampdenshire Wonder
Augustin Bernard	France	29 December 1947	Geographer	Les Confins algéro-marocains
Tristan Bernard	France	7 December 1947	Playwright	Mémoires d'un jeune homme rangé
Jean-Richard Bloch	France	15 March 1947	Writer	
Luigi Bonelli	Italy	26 January 1947	Orientalist	Lessico italiano-turco
Pierre Bonnard	France	23 January 1947	Painter, printmaker	
Wolfgang Borchert	Germany	20 November 1947	Playwright	Draußen vor der Tür
Angela Brazil	United Kingdom	13 March 1947	Children's books author	
Óscar Castro Zúñiga	Chile	1 October 1947	Writer	Llampo de Sangre, Camino en el alba, Comarca del jazmín
Willa Cather	United States	24 April 1947	Writer	My Ántonia
Dmitry Censor	Russia	26 December 1947	Poet	
George Chatterton-Hill	Ireland	12 January 1947	Philosopher	Heredity and Selection in Sociology
Édouard Chatton	France	23 April 1947	Biologist	
Winston Churchill	United States	12 March 1947	Novelist	The Celebrity
Ananda Coomaraswamy	United States	9 September 1947	historian, philosopher	The Dance of Shiva
Aleister Crowley	United Kingdom	1 December 1947	Poet	Bibliography
Franz Cumont	Belgium	20 August 1947	archeologist	Texts and Illustrated Monuments Relating to the Mysteries of Mithra
Petras Cvirka	Lithuania	2 May 1947	Author	Frank Kruk
Josef Čapek	Czech	April 1945	Painter, writer	All About Doggie and Pussycat
Anton Denikin	Russia	8 August 1947	Soldier, writer	Russian Turmoil
Walter Donaldson	United States	15 July 1947	Songwriter	Makin' Whoopee, Yes Sir, That's My Baby
Hans Fallada	Germany	5 February 1947	Writer	Der junge Goedeschal, Little Man, What Now?
Irving Fisher	United States	29 April 1947	Economist	The Purchasing Power of Money
Desmond FitzGerald	Ireland	9 April 1947	Architect	
Henry Ford	United States	7 April 1947	Business magnate	The International Jew
John Ulrich Giesy	United States	8 September 1947	Writer, physician	Palos of the Dog Star Pack
Victor Goldschmidt	Norway	20 March 1947	Mineralogist	Geochemische Verteilungsgesetze der Elemente
Reynaldo Hahn	France	28 January 1947	Composer	Ciboulette
G. H. Hardy	United Kingdom	1 December 1947	Mathematician	A Mathematician's Apology
Frank Heller	Sweden	14 October 1947	Writer	The London Adventures of Mr. Collin
Frederick Gowland Hopkins	United Kingdom	16 May 1947	Biochemist	Feeding experiments illustrating the importance of accessory factors in normal dietaries
Blanche Hoschedé Monet	France	8 December 1947	Painter	
Victor Horta	Belgium	9 August 1947	Architect	
Albert Howard	United Kingdom	20 October 1947	Botanist	An Agricultural Testament
Ricarda Huch	Germany	17 November 1947	Author	The Deruga Case
Stanislav Hudeček	Czech Republic	15 April 1947	Painter and illustrator	
E.M. Hull	United Kingdom	11 February 1947	Novelist	The Sheik
Pierre Janet	France	24 February 1947	Psychologist	La médecine psychologique
Afevork Ghevre Jesus	Ethiopia	25 September 1947	Writer	Ləbb Wälläd Tarik
Elizabeth Jordan	United States	24 February 1947	Journalist, suffragist, author	
Pyotr Krasnov	Russia	17 January 1947	Soldier, writer	From Double Eagle To the Red Flag
Karel Langer	Czech Republic	2 May 1947	Painter	
Richard Le Gallienne	United Kingdom	15 September 1947	author, poet	
C. Louis Leipoldt	South Africa	12 April 1947	Poet	
Philipp Lenard	Germany	20 May 1947	Physicist	Quantitative on cathode rays
Friedrich von Lerch	Austria	19 December 1947	Physicist	Separation of radium C from radium E
Hugh Lofting	United Kingdom	26 September 1947	Writer	Doctor Dolittle series
Ernst Lubitsch	Germany	30 November 1947	Director	
Manuel Machado	Spain	19 January 1947	Poet and playwright	La Lola se va a los puertos
Arthur Machen	United Kingdom	15 December 1947	Fantasy and horror author	The Great God Pan, The Three Impostors, The Hill of Dreams, The White People
Karl Mannheim	United Kingdom	9 January 1947	Sociologist	Ideology and Utopia
Henri Manuel	France	11 September 1947	Photographer	
William Moulton Marston	United States	2 May 1947	Psychologist, inventor, comic book writer	Wonder Woman, DISC assessment
Anatole de Monzie	France	11 January 1947	Encyclopaedist	Grandeur et servitude judiciaires
Yone Noguchi	Japan	13 July 1947	Writer	The American Diary of a Japanese Girl
Emma Orczy	United Kingdom	12 November 1947	Novelist, Playwright	The Scarlet Pimpernel
P. D. Ouspensky	Russia	2 October 1947	Mathematician, esotericist	
Friedrich Paschen	Germany	25 February 1947	Physicist	Ueber die zum Funkenübergang in Luft, Wasserstoff und Kohlensäure bei verschiedenen Drucken erforderliche Potentialdifferenz
John Henry Patterson	United Kingdom	18 June 1947	Soldier, hunter, author	The Man-Eaters of Tsavo
Reginald Payne	United Kingdom	20 December 1947	Illustrator	The Railway Series
Júlio Afrânio Peixoto	Brazil	12 January 1947	Writer	
Max Planck	Germany	4 October 1947	Scientist	
R. I. Pocock	United Kingdom	9 August 1947	Zoologist	The Fauna of British India
Carl Adolph Preyer	United States	16 November 1947	Composer	Festal Polonaise, Op.14
Charles-Ferdinand Ramuz	Switzerland	23 May 1947	Author	Beauty on Earth
Forrest Reid	United Kingdom	4 January 1947	Novelist	Young Tom
Nicholas Roerich	Russia; India	13 December 1947	Painter, writer	
Borys Romanowski	Georgia	1947	Polish painter active in Georgia	
Margaret Marshall Saunders	Canada	15 February 1947	Writer	
Johannes Schubert.	Austria	29 September 1947	Physicist	
Emil Schovánek	Czech Republic	11 July 1947	Painter	
Alexander Scott	United Kingdom	10 March 1947	Chemist	An Introduction to Chemical Theory
Kathleen Scott	United Kingdom	25 July 1947	Sculptor	
Victor Serge	Belgium	17 November 1947	Marxist revolutionary, writer	From Lenin to Stalin, Destiny of a Revolution
M. P. Shiel	Montserrat	17 February 1947	Horror and science fiction author	The Purple Cloud, The Yellow Danger
Andrei Shkuro	Russia	17 January 1947	Soldier, memoirist	
Alfred Walter Stewart	United Kingdom	1 July 1947	Chemist, Writer	Nordenholt's Million
Alan Sullivan	Canada	6 August 1947	Writer	The Great Divide
Flora Thompson	United Kingdom	21 May 1947	Novelist, poet	Lark Rise to Candleford
Mstislav Tsyavlovsky	Russia; Soviet Union	11 November 1947	Literary scholar	
Jim Tully	United States	22 June 1947	Writer	Beggars of Life
Marcel Varnel	France	13 July 1947	Film Director	
E. C. Vivian	United Kingdom	21 May 1947	Writer, editor	Fields of Sleep
Sidney Webb	United Kingdom	13 October 1947		
Alfred North Whitehead	United Kingdom	30 December 1947	Mathematician	Process and Reality
Anna Wickham	United Kingdom	30 April 1947	Poet	Songs of John Oland
Émile Auguste Joseph De Wildeman	Belgium	24 July 1947	Botanist	
Almroth Wright	United Kingdom	30 April 1947	Bacteriologist	The Unexpurgated Case against Woman Suffrage
Riichi Yokomitsu	Japan	30 December 1947	Writer	
Eduard von Zambaur	Austria	10 October 1947	Orientalist	Die Münzprägungen des Islams

== Entering the public domain in countries with life + 50 years ==
In most countries of Africa and Asia, as well as Belarus, Bolivia, Canada, New Zealand and Uruguay; a work enters the public domain 50 years after the creator's death.

Names	Country	Death	Occupation	Notable work
J. R. Ackerley	United Kingdom	4 June 1967	Writer, editor	My Dog Tulip, We Think the World of You
Ciro Alegría	Peru	17 February 1967	Journalist, novelist	El mundo es ancho y ajeno
Gordon Allport	United States	9 October 1967	psychologist	Becoming: Basic Considerations for a Psychology of Personality
Norman Angell	United Kingdom	7 October 1967	journalist, author, politician	The Great Illusion
Tudor Arghezi	Romania	14 July 1967	poet, novelist, essayist	Cuvinte Potrivite, Zdreanță
Marcel Aymé	France	14 October 1967	Novelist, children's writer, playwright	The passer-through-walls
Margaret Ayer Barnes	United States	25 October 1967	playwright, novelist, short-story writer	Years of Grace
Vladimir Bartol	Slovenia	12 September 1967	Writer	Alamut
Frank Bruno	New Zealand	12 July 1967	Writer, cartoonist, boxer	Black Noon at Ngutu, The Hellbuster
John Coltrane	United States	17 July 1967	Saxophonist, composer	Giant Steps
Isaac Deutscher	United Kingdom	19 August 1967	Biographer	Stalin: a Political Biography
Julien Duvivier	France	29 October 1967	film director, screenwriter	Sous le ciel de Paris
Ilya Ehrenburg	Russia	31 August 1967	writer, journalist, translator	Black Book, The Thaw
Sidney Bradshaw Fay	United States	29 August 1967	Historian	The Origins of the World War
Varian Fry	United States	13 September 1967	Journalist	The Peace that Failed, Surrender on Demand
Hein Gorny	Germany	14 June 1967	Photographer	Collection at Deutsche Fotothek
Che Guevara	Argentina; Cuba	9 October 1967	Communist revolutionary, author	Guerrilla Warfare
Robert van Gulik	Netherlands	24 September 1967	writer, diplomat, translator	The Chinese Maze Murders
Woody Guthrie	United States	3 October 1967	singer-songwriter	This Land Is Your Land
J. A. Hollo	Finland	22 January 1967	Translator, scholar	
Edward Hopper	United States	15 May 1967	Painter	Nighthawks
Langston Hughes	United States	22 May 1967	Writer	The Weary Blues
Lajos Kassák	Hungary	22 July 1967	Poet, writer, painter	
Margaret Kennedy	United Kingdom	31 July 1967	Novelist, playwright	The Constant Nymph, Troy Chimneys
Joseph Kesselring	United States	5 November 1967	playwright	Arsenic and Old Lace
Zoltán Kodály	Hungary	6 March 1967	Composer, philosopher, ethnomusicologist	Psalmus Hungaricus
Wolfgang Köhler	Germany	11 June 1967	Psychologist	The Mentality of Apes, Gestalt Psychology
Josefina Lerena Acevedo de Blixen	Uruguay	12 November 1967	Writer, journalist	Reyles
Douglas MacLean	United States	9 July 1967	actor, writer	Mama Loves Papa
René Magritte	Belgium	15 August 1967	Painter	The Difficult Crossing, The Treachery of Images
John Masefield	United Kingdom	12 May 1967	Poet, novelist	The Everlasting Mercy, Sea-Fever
André Maurois	France	9 October 1967	author	The Silence of Colonel Bramble
Carson McCullers	United States	29 September 1967	Novelist, playwright, poet	The Heart Is a Lonely Hunter, The Member of the Wedding
Edgar Neville	Spain	23 April 1967	playwright, film director	
Christopher Okigbo	Nigeria	September 1967	Writer	
J. Robert Oppenheimer	United States	18 February 1967	Physicist, professor	
Joe Orton	United Kingdom	9 August 1967	Playwright	The Ruffian on the Stair, Entertaining Mr Sloane
Dorothy Parker	United States	7 June 1967	Writer	Enough Rope
Violeta Parra	Chile	5 February 1967	Composer, songwriter	Gracias a la Vida
Arthur Ransome	United Kingdom	3 June 1967	Writer, journalist	Swallows and Amazons series
Otis Redding	United States	10 December 1967	Singer, songwriter	Respect
Elmer Rice	United States	8 May 1967	playwright	The Adding Machine, Street Scene
Gerhard Ritter	Germany	1 July 1967	Historian	Luther: Gestalt und Symbol
José Martínez Ruiz	Spain	2 March 1967	Novelist, essayist, literary critic	La ruta de Don Quijote, La voluntad, Antonio Azorín
Carl Sandburg	United States	22 July 1967	Poet, writer, journalist	Abraham Lincoln: The War Years, Chicago Poems
Siegfried Sassoon	United Kingdom	1 September 1967	poet, soldier, writer	Memoirs of a Fox-Hunting Man
Philippa Schuyler	United States	9 May 1967	Journalist, pianist	Adventures in Black and White
Walter Terence Stace	United Kingdom	2 August 1967	Philosopher, academic,	Mysticism and Philosophy
Billy Strayhorn	United States	31 May 1967	Composer, lyricist	Take the "A" Train, Lush Life
Jean Toomer	United States	30 March 1967	Poet, novelist	Cane
Pavlo Tychyna	Ukraine	16 September 1967	Poet, statesman	
Paul Whiteman	United States	29 December 1967	Bandleader, composer	Flamin' Mamie
Ossip Zadkine	France	25 November 1967	Artist	The Destroyed City
Wolfgang Zeller	Germany	11 January 1967	Composer	
João Guimarães Rosa	Brazil	19 November 1967	Writer	Sagarana

== Entering the public domain in Australia ==
In 2004 copyright in Australia changed from a "plus 50" law to a "plus 70" law, in line with America and the European Union. But the change was not made retroactive (unlike the 1995 change in the European Union which bought some e.g. British authors back into copyright, especially those who died from 1925 to 1944). Hence the work of an author who died before 1955 is normally in the public domain in Australia; but the copyright of authors was extended to 70 years after death for those who died in 1955 or later, and no more Australian authors would come out of copyright until 1 January 2026 (those who died in 1955).

== Entering the public domain in the United States ==
Under the Copyright Term Extension Act, 2018 was the last year that no published works would enter the public domain in this jurisdiction. Only unpublished and unregistered works whose authors died in 1947 entered the public domain.

On January 26, 2018, Ludlow Music, the music publisher for "We Shall Overcome", agreed in a legal settlement that the song is in the public domain.

== Worldwide ==
On February 27, 2018, the video game One Hour One Life was released into the public domain.

== See also ==
- List of countries' copyright lengths
- Public Domain Day
- Creative Commons
- Public Domain
- Over 300 public domain authors available in Wikisource (any language), with descriptions from Wikidata
- 1947 in literature, 1957 in literature, 1967 in literature and 1977 in literature
