= List of publications in physics =

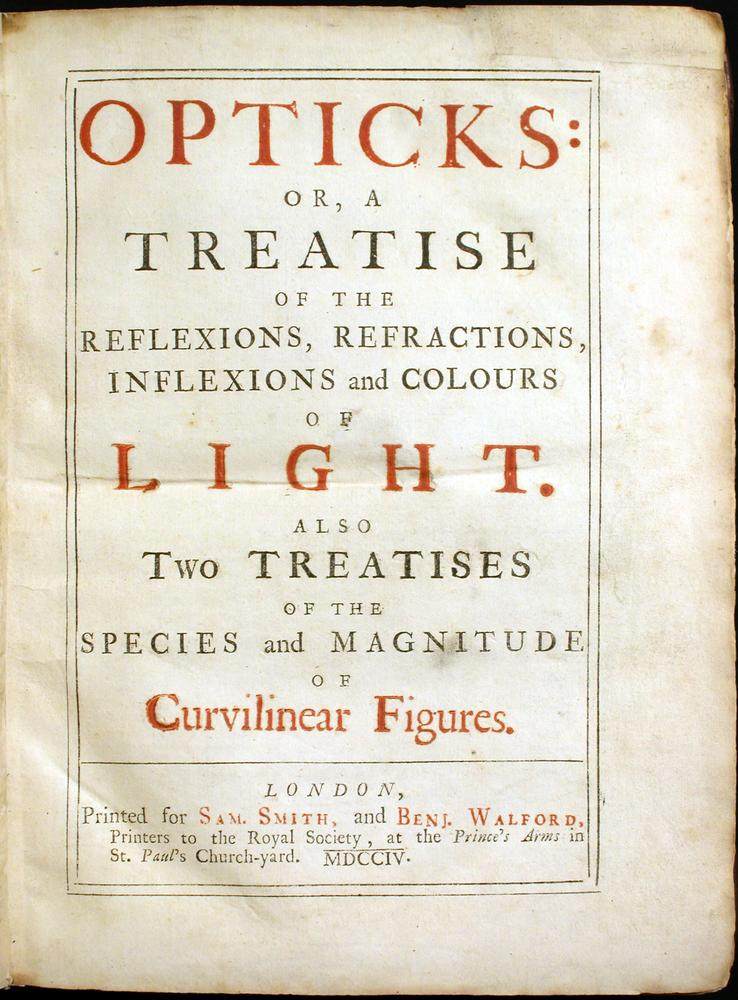
Title page of the first edition of Isaac Newton's Opticks (1704)

This is a list of publications in physics, organized by type.

== General audience ==
- List of books on popular physics concepts

== Textbooks ==
- List of textbooks on classical mechanics and quantum mechanics
- List of textbooks in electromagnetism
- List of textbooks on relativity
- List of textbooks in thermodynamics and statistical mechanics

== Books and treatises before 1900 ==
- Aristotle, Physics (4th century BC)
- Aristotle, On the Heavens (4th century BC)
- Ptolemy, Almagest (2nd century AD)
- Ibn al-Haytham, Book of Optics (circa 1015)
- Nicolaus Copernicus, De revolutionibus orbium coelestium (1543)
- Alonso de la Vera Cruz, Physica speculatio (1557)
- Simon Stevin, De Beghinselen Der Weeghconst (1586)
- Galileo Galilei, De motu antiquiora (circa 1590)
- Johannes Kepler, Mysterium Cosmographicum (1596)
- William Gilbert, De Magnete (1600)
- Galileo Galilei, Le Mecaniche (circa 1600)
- Johannes Kepler, Astronomia nova (1609)
- Johannes Kepler, Harmonice Mundi (1619)
- Galileo Galilei, Dialogue Concerning the Two Chief World Systems (1632)
- Galileo Galilei, Two New Sciences (1638)
- René Descartes. Principles of Philosophy (1644)
- Christiaan Huygens, Horologium Oscillatorium (1673)
- Isaac Newton, Philosophiæ Naturalis Principia Mathematica (1687)
- Christiaan Huygens, Treatise on Light (1690)
- Isaac Newton, Opticks (1704)
- Daniel Bernoulli, Hydrodynamica (1738)
- Benjamin Franklin, Experiments and Observations on Electricity (1751)
- Johann Heinrich Lambert, Photometria (1760)
- Joseph-Louis Lagrange, Mécanique analytique (1788)
- Pierre-Simon Laplace, Traité de mécanique céleste (1798)
- Sadi Carnot, Reflections on the Motive Power of Fire (1824)
- William Kingdon Clifford, Elements of Dynamic (1878)
- James Clerk Maxwell, An Elementary Treatise on Electricity (1881)

== Bibliographies by author ==
- Max Born
- Albert Einstein
- John von Neumann
- Emmy Noether

== Journals ==
- List of physics journals
- List of fluid mechanics journals
- List of materials science journals
- List of mathematical physics journals
