= Chevrillon =

Chevrillon may refer to:

== Places ==
- Chevrillon Lake, Quebec, Canada

== Persons ==
- André Chevrillon (1864–1957), a French writer
- Benjamin Antier (1787–1870), a French playwright, born Benjamin Chevrillon
