= Eipper =

Eipper is a surname. Notable people with the surname include:

- Christopher Eipper (1813–1894), Austrian missionary
- Paul Eipper (1891–1964), German writer on animals
- Richard Eipper - hang-gliding pilot and founder of Quicksilver Aircraft
