= Umera =

Umera or Ümera may refer to

- Battle of Ümera between Livonian Crusaders and Estonians in 1210
- Ümera jõel, a 1934 novel by Mait Metsanurk
- Umera Ahmad (born 1976), Pakistani author and screenwriter
