= Georges Duby =

French historian

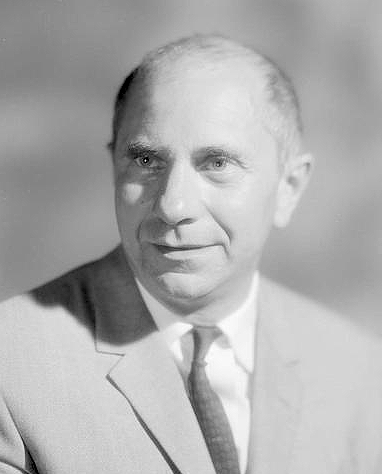
- Duby in 1967
- Born: 7 October 1919; Paris, France
- Died: 3 December 1996 (aged 77); Le Tholonet, France
- Education: University of Lyon; University of Paris Faculty of Humanities
- Scientific career
- Fields: Social and economic history of the Middle Ages

Georges Duby (French: [ʒɔʁʒ dybi]; 7 October 1919 – 3 December 1996) was a French historian who specialised in the social and economic history of the Middle Ages. He ranks among the most influential medieval historians of the twentieth century and was one of France's most prominent public intellectuals from the 1970s to his death. In 2019, his work was published in the Bibliothèque de la Pléiade.

== Early life and education ==
Born in Paris to a family of craftsmen of Burgundian and Alsacian origin, Duby was initially educated in the field of historical geography before he moved into history. He earned an undergraduate degree at Lyon in 1942 and completed his graduate thesis at the Sorbonne under Charles-Edmond Perrin in 1952.

== Career ==
He taught first at Besançon and then at the University of Aix-en-Provence before he was appointed in 1970 to the Chair of the History of Medieval Society in the Collège de France. He remained attached to the Collège until his retirement in 1991. He was elected to the Académie française in 1987.

== Medieval history ==
Although Duby authored dozens of books, articles and reviews during his prolific career—for academic as well as popular audiences—his reputation and legacy as a scholar will always be attached to his first monograph, a published version of his 1952 doctoral thesis entitled La société aux XIe et XIIe siècles dans la région mâconnaise (Society in the 11th and 12th centuries in the Mâconnais region). La société exerted a profound influence on medieval scholarship in the second half of the twentieth century, placing the study of medieval feudal society on an entirely new footing. Working from the extensive documentary sources surviving from the Burgundian monastery of Cluny, as well as the dioceses of Mâcon and Dijon, Duby excavated the complex social and economic relationships among the individuals and institutions of the Mâconnais region, charting a profound shift in the social structures of medieval society around the year 1000.

Duby argued that in early eleventh century, governing institutions—particularly comital courts established under the Carolingian monarchy—that had represented public justice and order in Burgundy during the ninth and tenth centuries receded and gave way to a new feudal order wherein independent aristocratic knights wielded power over peasant communities through strong-arm tactics and threats of violence. The emergence of this new, decentralized society of dynastic lords could then explain such later eleventh-century phenomena as the Peace of God, the Gregorian reform movement and the Crusades.

Following upon this, Duby formulated a famous theory about the Crusades: that the tremendous response to the idea of Holy War against the Muslims can be traced to the desire of iuvenes, knights, mostly young and with little prospect of becoming lords, to make their fortunes by venturing abroad and seeking fame in the Levant. While Duby's theory had long-lasting influence, later scholars such as Jonathan Riley-Smith argued against it, arguing that there was no large-scale shortage of land in Western Europe at the time, that knights actually lost money going on crusade, and that lay religious sentiment was their primary motivation. Not all modern scholars follow Riley-Smith in this regard.

Duby's intensive and rigorous examination of a local society based on archival sources and a broad understanding of the social, environmental and economic bases of daily life became a standard model for medieval historical research in France for decades after the appearance of La société. Throughout the 1970s and 80s, French doctoral students investigated their own corners of medieval France, Italy and Spain in a similar way, hoping to compare and contrast their own results with those of Duby's Mâconnais and its thesis about the transformation of European society at the end of the first millennium.

As an eminent student of Perrin, who, with Marc Bloch and others, laid the foundations of what became known as the "Annales School" of French social history, Duby was in many ways the most visible exponent of the Annaliste tradition in post-war France, emphasizing the need to place people and their daily lives at the center of historical inquiry.

== History of mentalities ==
Duby was also a pioneer in what he and other Annaliste historians in the 1970s and 80s came to call the "history of mentalities", or the study of not just what people did, but their value systems and how they imagined their world. In books like The Three Orders: Feudal Society Imagined and The Age of Cathedrals, Duby showed how ideals and social reality existed in dynamic relationship to one another. His distilled biographical essay on William Marshal, 1st Earl of Pembroke set the knight's career in the context of feudal loyalties, honour and the chivalric frame of mind.

Duby's interest in the idea of historical "mentalities" extended to thinking about the position of contemporary society vis-a-vis its past. In Le Dimanche de Bouvines (1973) on the pivotal 1214 Battle of Bouvines, Duby chose not to analyze the battle itself, but the ways it had been represented and remembered over time and the role its memory had played in the formation of French ideas about its medieval past. The book remains a classic of Annales-style historiography, eschewing the "great man" and event-oriented theories of political history in favor of asking questions about the evolution of historical perceptions and ideas over the long term, the longue durée. Duby also wrote frequently in newspapers and popular journals and was a regular guest on radio and television programs promoting historical awareness and support for the arts and social sciences in France. He served as the first director of Société d'édition de programmes de télévision (aka La Sept), a French broadcast network dedicated to educational programming.

His last book, L'histoire continue (History Continues) (1991; Engl. trans. 1994), is an intellectual autobiography. In it, Duby stresses the importance of the historian as a public figure who can make the past relevant and exciting to those in the present. “Make no mistake: the first function of historical literature had always been to entertain.”

== Honours and awards ==
=== Honours ===
- Commander of the Legion of Honour.
- Grand Cross of the National Order of Merit.
- Commander of the Ordre des Palmes Académiques.
- Commander of the Ordre des Arts et des Lettres.
- Knight of the Order of Agricultural Merit.
- Officier of the Order of Orange-Nassau.

=== Awards ===
- Grand prix Gobert (1977)
- Prix des Ambassadeurs (France, 1973)
- Lauréat du concours général (France)

=== Acknowledgement ===
- Member of the Académie Française
- Member of the Académie des Inscriptions et Belles-Lettres
- Member of the British Academy
- Member of the Medieval Academy of America
- Member of the Royal Academy of Science, Letters and Fine Arts of Belgium
- Member of the Accademia dei Lincei
- Member of the Academia Europaea
- Member of the Hungarian Academy of Sciences
- Member of the Royal Spanish Academy
- Member of the Real Academia de Buenas Letras de Barcelona
- Member of the American Philosophical Society
- Member of the Royal Historical Society

=== Honorary degrees ===
- University of Cambridge
- University of Oxford
- University of Amsterdam
- Université catholique de Louvain
- University of Liège
- Université de Montréal
- American University of Paris
- University of Granada
- University of Santiago de Compostela
- John Paul II Catholic University of Lublin
- Harvard University

== Selected bibliography ==
- A History of French Civilization (with Robert Mandrou) (New York: Random House) 1964
- The Making of the Christian West: 980–1140; The Europe of the Cathedrals: 1140–1280; Foundations of a New Humanism: 1280–1440 (Geneva: Skira) 1966–67
- Rural Economy and Country Life in the Medieval West (Columbia: University of South Carolina Press) 1968. ISBN 0-872-49347-4
- The Early Growth of the European Economy: Warriors and Peasants from the Seventh to the Twelfth Century (Ithaca: Cornell) University Press) 1974. ISBN 978-0-8014-9169-6.
- La Société aux XIe et XIIe siècles dans la région mâconnaise (portions translated in The Chivalrous Society (1978; repr. 1981))
- Duby, Georges (1953). La société aux XIe et XIIe siècle dans la région mâconnaise [Society in the 11th and 12th centuries in the Mâconnais region]. Bibliothèque générale de l'École pratique des hautes études, VIe section (in French). Paris: Armand Colin. OCLC 1252087084.
- Le Dimanche de Bouvines (1973) (Translated in English as The Legend of Bouvines (1990) ISBN 0-520-06238-8)
- The Year 1000 (1974).
- The Age of the Cathedrals: Art and Society 980–1420 (1976).
- The Three Orders: Feudal Society Imagined (Chicago: University of Chicago Press) 1981.
- Dialogues, with Guy Lardreau, Paris, Flammarion, 1981, repr. Les petits Platons, 2013.
- The Knight, The Lady, and the Priest: The Making of Modern Marriage in Medieval France (New York: Pantheon) 1981.
- Guillaume le Maréchal (Paris: Fayard), 1983, tr. as William Marshal: The Flower of Chivalry (1984).
- L'histoire continue (1991)
