= Léon Homo =

French historian (1872–1957)

- Born: Léon Pol Homo; 16 December 1872; Épernay
- Died: 16 August 1957 (aged 84); Paris
- Occupation: Historian

Léon Homo (16 December 1872 – 16 August 1957) was a 20th-century French historian, a specialist of Roman history.

== Biography ==
After he entered the École normale supérieure in 1894, he obtained his agrégation in 1897, and defended his doctoral thesis in 1904. His principal thesis based on an analysis of the Augustan History was devoted to emperor Aurelian, and the book he published in 1904 still constitutes a reference. His secondary thesis dealt with Claudius Gothicus, the predecessor of Aurelian.

A member of the École française de Rome from 1897 to 1900, he conducted archaeological excavations in 1900 on the site of Dougga in Tunisia. From 1904 until 1940 he was a professor of ancient history at the Faculté de Lettres de Lyon. When he retired in 1940, he settled in Paris where he pursued his historical publications.

== Works ==
From 1928, Léon Homo published a number of popular books for an educated public addressing Roman history as a whole, and the relations between the Empire and Christianity.

In 1926, he vigorously opposed the thesis of Hermann Dessau on the uniqueness of the author of the Augustan History, defending the traditional view of six writers and their historical value. Subsequent historical research proved him wrong.

- 1904: Essai sur le règne d’Aurélien (270-275), Paris, 1904 (doctorate thesis)
- 1922: Problèmes sociaux de jadis à présent, Paris, Éditions Flammarion, Bibliothèque de philosophie scientifique
- 1925: L'Italie primitive et les débuts de l'impérialisme romain, Paris, La Renaissance du livre
- 1925: L'Empire Romain : le gouvernement du monde, la défense du monde, l'exploitation du monde, Paris, Payot
- 1926: Notes de lecture de Paul Graindor, Revue belge de philologie et d'histoire, vol. 5, n° 4, p. 1068-1074,
- 1926: « Les documents de l'Histoire Auguste et leur valeur historique », Revue historique, 151 (2), p. 162-198 and 152 (1), p. 1-31.
- 1927: Les institutions politiques romaines, de la cité à l'Etat, Paris, Renaissance du livre
- 1930: La civilisation romaine, Paris, Payot
- 1931: Les empereurs romains et le christianisme, Paris, Payot
- 1933: Le Haut Empire, Paris, PUF, Histoire générale under the direction of Gustave Glotz
- 1934: Rome médiévale, 476-1420 : histoire, civilisation, vestiges, Paris, Payot
- 1935: Auguste, Paris, Payot
- 1936: Notes de lecture de Paul Graindor, Revue belge de philologie et d'histoire, vol. 15, n° 1, pp. 177–178
- 1936: Sylla, Paris, Desclée de Brouwer
- 1941: Nouvelle histoire romaine, Paris, Fayard
- 1947: Le Siècle d'or de l'Empire romain, Paris, Fayard
- 1949: Vespasien, l'empereur du bon sens (69-79), Paris, Albin Michel
- 1950: Notes de lecture de André Charles André, L'antiquité classique, Tome 19, fasc. 2, pp. 507–509 .
- 1950: De la Rome païenne à la Rome chrétienne
- 1951: Alexandre le Grand, Paris, Fayard
- 1951: Rome impériale et l'urbanisme dans l'Antiquité, Paris, Albin Michel (series "L'évolution de l'Humanité").
- 1952: Notes de lecture de Laet Sigfried, L'Antiquité classique, Tome 21, fasc. 2, pp. 547–548

== Bibliography ==
- Perrin, Charles-Edmond (1957). "Éloge funèbre de M. Léon Homo, correspondant français de l'Académie". Comptes rendus des séances de l'Académie des Inscriptions et Belles-Lettres. No. 3. pp. 288–291.
- Merlin, Alfred (1957). "Léon Homo". Journal des savants. pp. 134–135.
- Pierre Wuilleumier, « Léon Homo », Mélanges d'archéologie et d'histoire, T. 70, 1958. pp. 446–447 .
