= Hyères, France =

Photograph by Henri Cartier-Bresson

Hyères, France (1932)

Hyères, France is a black and white photograph taken by Henri Cartier-Bresson in 1932. It is one of the photographs from the year when he started taking photography more professionally. He took then many pictures in France and in other countries, like Italy, Spain, Morocco and Mexico, with his portable Leica camera.

== History and description ==
Cartier-Bresson had returned from Africa in 1931, and started a professional career as a photographer the same year, both artistically and as a photojournalist. He was in a holiday in Hyères, southern France, in 1932, when he took this photograph. He was influenced in his sense of composition by Cubist painting, in particular his lessons with French painter André Lhote, Surrealism, and the work of fellows photographers like André Kertész.

He positioned himself at the top of a staircase with his camera and waited for some activity to take place. The picture of a man casually cycling taken from that point of view shows intuition and spontaneity. This picture can be seen in relation to the concept of "fixed-explosive", described by Clément Chéroux as "the state of something simultaneously in motion and at rest... Cartier-Bresson loved the movement that set lines in motion and energised compositions. He often introduced mobile subjects into his compositions... By pressing the shutter release on his Leica, he stopped the movement, but at the same time he was able to produce images that, through their framing, composition and rhythm, still preserved the dynamism of the action. According to the principle of dialectic synthesis, they are therefore at one and the same time in motion and at rest: fixed-explosive."

This purpose can be seen in this picture, the combination of architecture elements suggesting movement with spirals and curves, leading to the blurred image of the moving man in the bicycle.

== Public collections ==
There are prints of this photograph in several public collections, including the Henri Cartier-Bresson Foundation, in Paris, Tate Modern, in London, the Museum of Modern Art and the Metropolitan Museum of Art, in New York City, the Art Institute of Chicago and the Museum of Fine Arts, in Houston.
