= Mait Metsanurk =

Estonian writer (1879–1957)

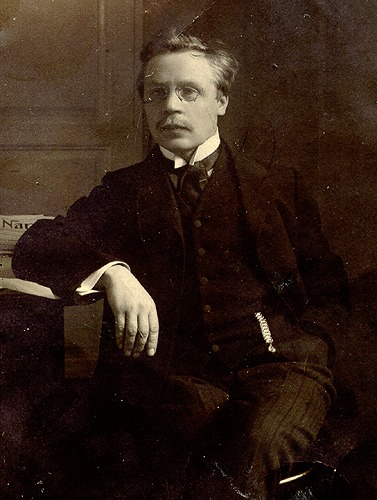
Mait Metsanurk in 1911

Mait Metsanurk (born Eduard Hubel, 19 November 1879 – 21 August 1957) was an Estonian writer who led the neo-realist school of Estonian literature.

== Early years ==
Mait Metsanurk was born as the youngest of eight children in a peasant family in Saare farmstead, Metsanuka (now Tartu Parish), in the Kreis Dorpat of the Governorate of Livonia. He attended elementary school in Orge and a Russian-speaking city school in Tartu. He worked in various positions, first as an office clerk, then as a schoolteacher and from 1906 as a journalist. He is buried at the Metsakalmistu cemetery in Tallinn.

== Career ==
Mait Metsanurk reached his literary breakthrough in 1908 with his realistic portrayal of Estonian town and country life at the time. In particular, social contradictions and tensions were used in his work. He became one of the most prolific and popular writers and playwrights of his era. Together with A. H. Tammsaare (1878–1940), he is considered one of the most outstanding representatives of Estonian neo-realism of the interwar period. His main work, the historical novel Ümera jõel (On the Ümera River) (1934), depicts the struggle of the pagan Estonians against the Danish and German conquest in the thirteenth century. In addition, he worked as a literary critic and translator. In 1924-25 and from 1930 to 1936 Metsanurk was chairman of the Estonian Writers' Union. With the Soviet occupation of Estonia, Metsanurk was sidelined politically and expelled from the Writers' Union. He was rehabilitated in 1956, after the death of Stalin.

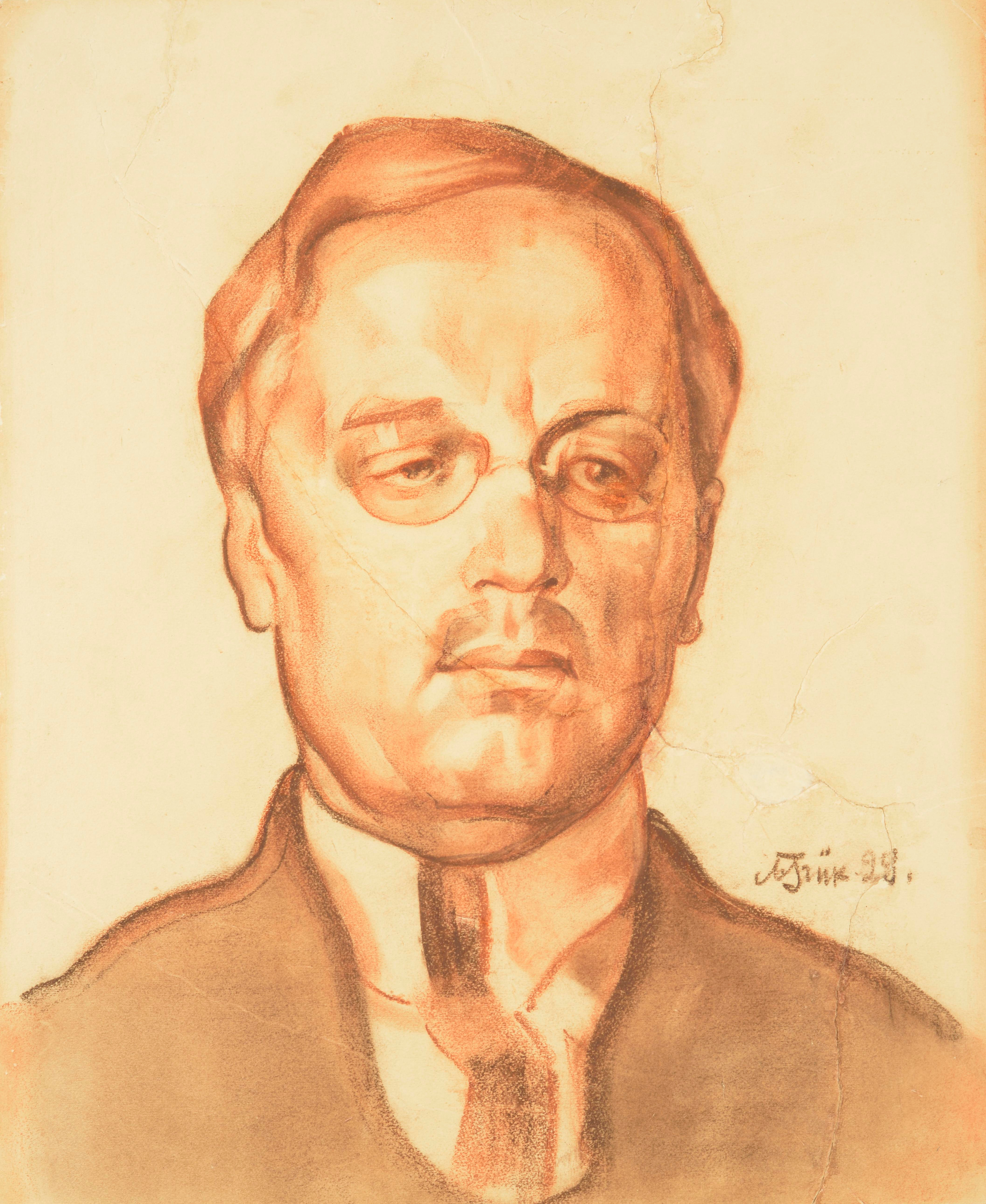
"Portrait of Mait Metsanurk" by Nikolai Triik, 1929

== Literary work ==
=== Prose ===
- Isamaa õilmed (narrative, Tallinn 1908)
- Vahesaare Villem (novel, Tallinn 1909)
- Jumalalapsed (short stories, Tallinn 1910)
- Orjad (novel, Tallinn 1912)
- Toho-Oja Anton (novella, Tallinn 1916)
- Ennäe inimest! (Novel, 1918)
- Epp (narrative, Tartu 1920)
- Jumalata (narrative, Tallinn 1921)
- Taavet Soovere elu ja surm (novel, 1922)
- Valge pilv (novel, Tartu, 1925)
- Jäljetu haud (novel, Tartu, 1926)
- Viimne päev (short story collection, Tallinn 1927)
- Punane tuul (novel, Tartu, 1928)
- Jutustused ja novellid (stories and novellas, Tartu 1929)
- Fr. Arrast & Pojad (novel, Tartu, 1930)
- Elu murrab sisse (short story collection, Tartu, 1931)
- Taniel heitleb (narrative, Tartu 1932)
- Maine ike (short story collection, Tartu, 1933)
- Mändide all (youth narrative, Tartu, 1933)
- Ümera jõel (novel, Tartu, 1934)
- Soosaare (novel, Tartu, 1936)
- Kutsutud ja seatud (diary novel, Tartu, 1937)
- Tuli tuha all (novel, Tartu, 1939)
- Tee algul. Mälestused I (Memories, Tallinn 1946)
- Suvine pööripäev (novel, Tallinn 1957)

=== Plays ===
- Uues korteris (Comedy, Tallinn 1908)
- Vagade elu (Comedy Tartu 1923)
- Kindrali poeg (Drama, Tartu, 1925)
- Talupoja poeg (Drama, Tartu, 1929)
- Mässuvaim ehk Agulirahvas läheb ajalukku (Comedy, Tallinn 1931)
- Haljal oksal (Comedy, Tallinn 1932)
- C. R. Jakobson (Drama, Tartu, 1935)
- Maret elukoolis (Comedy, Tallinn 1938)
