= Sleeping Muse =

Sculpture by Constantin Brâncuși

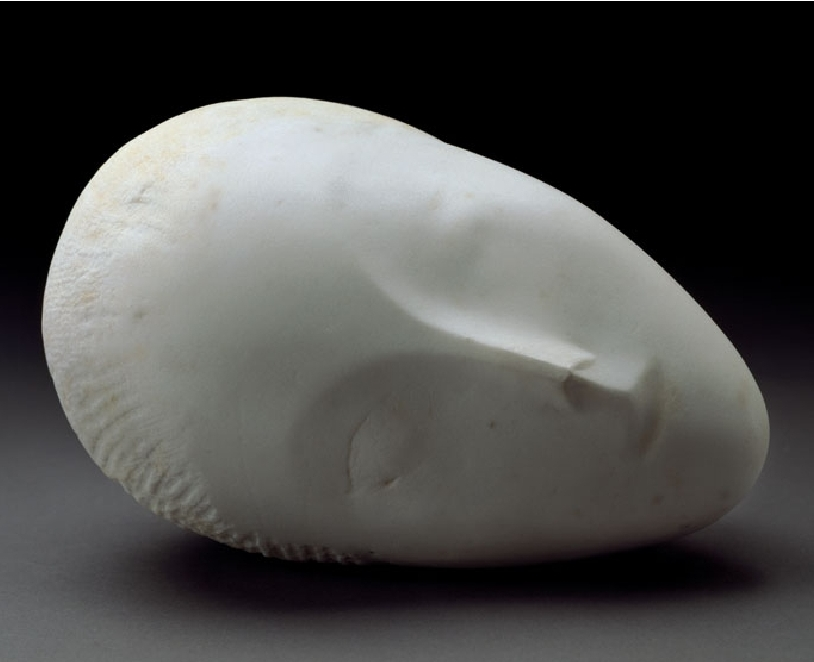
- Marble version
- Artist: Constantin Brâncuși
- Year: 1910
- Dimensions: 15.2 cm × 24.1 cm × 17.1 cm (6 in × 9.5 in × 6.75 in)
- Location: Metropolitan Museum of Art Musée National d'Art Moderne Art Institute of Chicago
- Accession: 49.70.225

The Sleeping Muse (Romanian: Muza adormită or Muză dormind) is a bronze sculpture created by Constantin Brâncuși in 1910. It was originally carved from marble using Baroness Renée-Irana Frachon as the model. Refining the sculpture, Brâncuși cast several of the sculptures in bronze, which are now in museums around the world, including the Metropolitan Museum of Art in New York City, the Musée National d'Art Moderne in Paris, and the Art Institute of Chicago. It is a model of a head, without a body, with markings to show features such as hair, nose, lips, and closed eyes. In A History of Western Art, Laurie Adams says that the sculpture has "an abstract, curvilinear quality and a smooth contour that create an impression of elegance." By casting them in metal with a fine finish, these sculptures are "self-sufficient, archetypal modern forms".
