= An Evening with Groucho =

Live album by Groucho Marx

An Evening With Groucho is a 1972 compilation recording of the one-man show by American comedian Groucho Marx, edited from three separate performances: New York City's Carnegie Hall, C.Y. Stephens Auditorium at Iowa State University, and Masonic Auditorium in San Francisco, California. With the Carnegie Hall show's introduction by Dick Cavett, the resulting performances were released as a double album by A&M Records. Marx shared family and show business stories and performed songs from Marx Brothers stage shows and movies. Marvin Hamlisch performed an opening overture and accompanied Groucho on the piano. A numbered, limited edition edited single picture disc edition was released in 1978, and a compact disc version was later briefly available.

In 2018, the recording was selected for preservation in the National Recording Registry by the Library of Congress as being "culturally, historically, or aesthetically significant".
