= Torso of a Young Man =

Sculpture by Constantin Brancusi

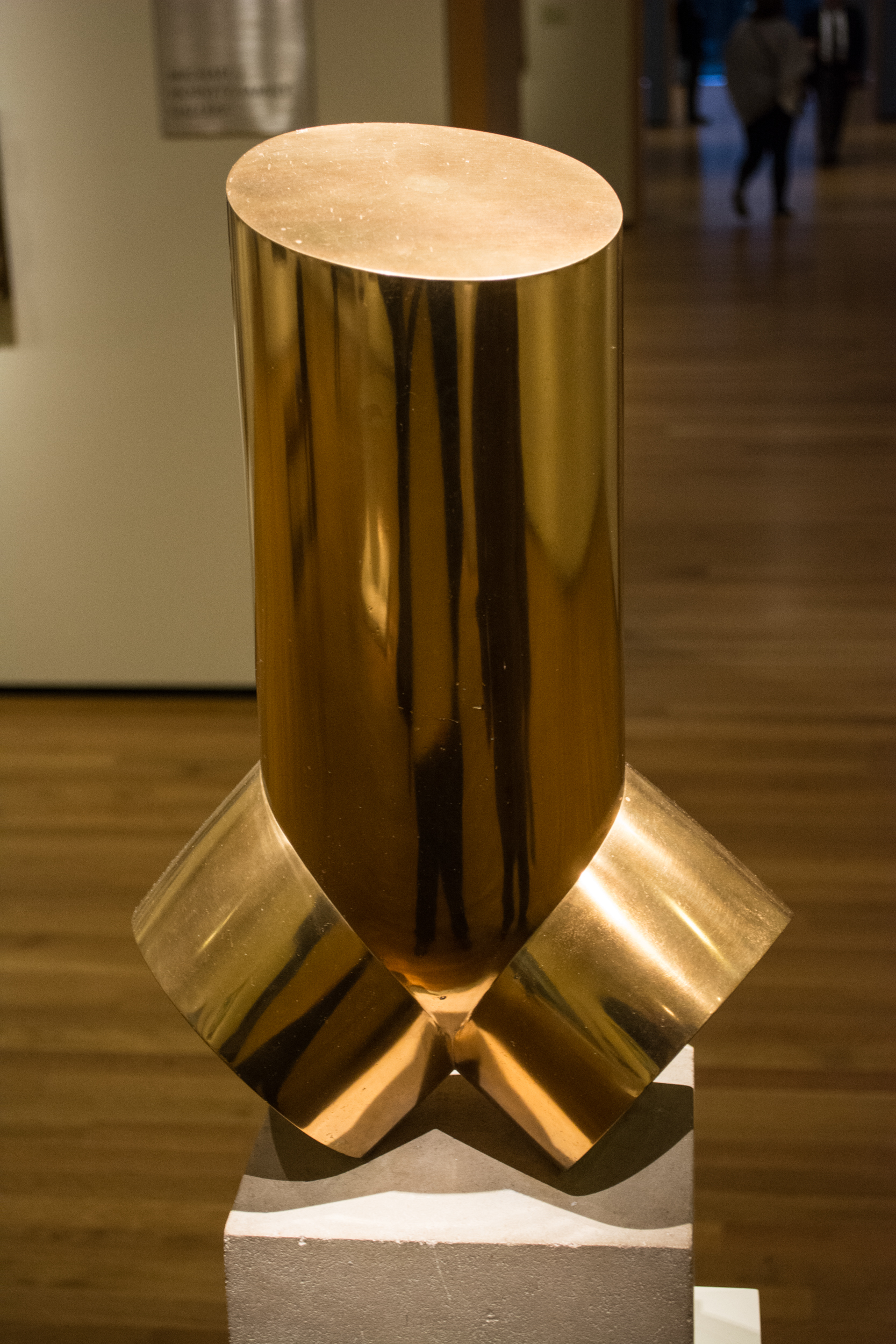
Brass version in the Cleveland Museum of Art

Torso of a Young Man is a sculpture created by Constantin Brâncuși between 1917 and 1922. It depicts the male torso as a simple cylinder mounted on vestigial cylindrical legs, cut off at mid-thigh. Sidney Geist has pointed out that the sculpture, without genitalia, is itself a phallus with testes. There are several versions. Torso of a Young Man I was carved from a fork in a maple branch wood mounted on a limestone block. It is now in the Brodsky Gallery of the Philadelphia Museum of Art. A similar sculpture, dated 1923 and carved in walnut, is in the Musée National d'Art Moderne, Centre Georges Pompidou, Paris. Brâncuși also cast the torso in highly polished brass. The two examples of this version are held in the Cleveland Museum of Art and the Hirshhorn Museum and Sculpture Garden.
