= Emmy Noether bibliography =

Emmy Noether was a German mathematician. This article lists the publications upon which her reputation is built (in part).

== First epoch (1908–1919) ==
Index	Year	Title and English translation	Journal, volume, pages	Classification and notes
1	1907	Über die Bildung des Formensystems der ternären biquadratischen Form On Complete Systems of Invariants for Ternary Biquadratic Forms	Sitzung Berichte der Physikal.-mediz. Sozietät in Erlangen, 39, 176–179	Algebraic invariants. Preliminary 4-page report on her dissertation results.
2	1908	Über die Bildung des Formensystems der ternären biquadratischen Form On Complete Systems of Invariants for Ternary Biquadratic Forms	Journal für die reine und angewandte Mathematik, 134, 23–90 + 2 tables	Algebraic invariants. Main description of her dissertation, including 331 explicitly calculated ternary invariants.
3	1910	Zur Invariantentheorie der Formen von n Variabeln On the Theory of Invariants for Forms of n Variables^{§}	Jahresbericht der Deutschen Mathematiker-Vereinigung, 19, 101–104	Algebraic invariants. Short communication describing the following paper.
4	1911	Zur Invariantentheorie der Formen von n Variabeln On the Theory of Invariants for Forms of n Variables^{§}	Journal für die reine und angewandte Mathematik, 139, 118–154	Algebraic invariants. Extension of the formal algebraic-invariant methods to forms of an arbitrary number n of variables. Noether applied these results in her publications #8 and #16.
5	1913	Rationale Funktionenkörper Rational Function Fields^{§}	Jahresbericht der Deutschen Mathematiker-Vereinigung, 22, 316–319	Field theory. See the following paper.
6	1915	Körper und Systeme rationaler Funktionen Fields and Systems of Rational Functions	Mathematische Annalen, 76, 161–191	Field theory. In this and the preceding paper, Noether investigates fields and systems of rational functions of n variables, and demonstrates that they have a rational basis. In this work, she combined then-recent work of Ernst Steinitz on fields, with the methods for proving finiteness developed by David Hilbert. The methods she developed in this paper appeared again in her publication #11 on the inverse Galois problem.
7	1915	Der Endlichkeitssatz der Invarianten endlicher Gruppen The Finiteness Theorem for Invariants of Finite Groups	Mathematische Annalen, 77, 89–92	Group theory. Proof that the invariants of a finite group are themselves finite, following the methods of David Hilbert.
8	1915	Über ganze rationale Darstellung der Invarianten eines Systems von beliebig vielen Grundformen On an Integral Rational Representation of the Invariants of a System of Arbitrarily Many Basis Forms^{§}	Mathematische Annalen, 77, 93–102	Applies her earlier work on n-forms.
9	1916	Die allgemeinsten Bereiche aus ganzen transzendenten Zahlen The Most General Domains of Completely Transcendental Numbers	Mathematische Annalen, 77, 103–128 (corrig., 81, 30)	
10	1916	Die Funktionalgleichungen der isomorphen Abbildung Functional Equations of the Isomorphic Mapping	Mathematische Annalen, 77, 536–545	
11	1918	Gleichungen mit vorgeschriebener Gruppe Equations with Prescribed Group	Mathematische Annalen, 78, 221–229 (corrig., 81, 30)	Galois theory. Important paper on the inverse Galois problem — as assessed by B. L. van der Waerden in 1935, her work was "the most significant contribution made by anyone so far" to this still-unsolved problem.
12	1918	Invarianten beliebiger Differentialausdrücke Invariants of Arbitrary Differential Expressions^{§}	Nachrichten der Königlichen Gesellschaft der Wissenschaften zu Göttingen, Math.-phys. Klasse, 1918, 38–44	Differential invariants. Introduces the concept of a reduced system, in which some differential invariants are reduced to algebraic invariants.
13	1918	Invariante Variationsprobleme Invariant Variation Problems	Nachrichten der Königlichen Gesellschaft der Wissenschaften zu Göttingen, Math.-phys. Klasse, 1918, 235–257	Differential invariants. Seminal paper introducing Noether's theorems, which allow differential invariants to be developed from symmetries in the calculus of variations.
14	1919	Die arithmetische Theorie der algebraischen Funktionen einer Veränderlichen in ihrer Beziehung zu den übrigen Theorien und zu der Zahlkörpertheorie The Arithmetic Theory of Algebraic Functions of One Variable in its Relationship to the Other Theories and to Number Field Theory^{§}	Jahresbericht der Deutschen Mathematiker-Vereinigung, 28 (Abt. 1), 182–203	
15	1919	Die Endlichkeit des Systems der ganzzahligen Invarianten binärer Formen A Proof of Finiteness for Integral Binary Invariants	Nachrichte der Königlichen Gesellschaft der Wissenschaften zu Göttingen, Math.-phys. Klasse, 1919, 138–156	Algebraic invariants. Proof that the integral invariants of binary forms are themselves finite. Similar to publication #7, this paper is devoted to the research area of Hilbert.
16	1920	Zur Reihenentwicklung in der Formentheorie On Series Expansions in the Theory of Forms^{§}	Mathematische Annalen, 81, 25–30	Another application of her work in publication #4 on the algebraic invariants of forms with n variables.

== Second epoch (1920–1926) ==
In the second epoch, Noether turned her attention to the theory of rings. With her paper Moduln in nichtkommutativen Bereichen, insbesondere aus Differential- und Differenzenausdrücken, Hermann Weyl states, "It is here for the first time that the Emmy Noether appears whom we all know, and who changed the face of algebra by her work."

Index	Year	Title and English translation	Journal, volume, pages	Classification and notes
17	1920	Moduln in nichtkommutativen Bereichen, insbesondere aus Differential- und Differenzenausdrücken Modules in Non-commutative Domains, especially Those Composed of Differential and Difference Expressions^{§}	Mathematische Zeitschrift, 8, 1–35	Ideals and modules. Written with W. Schmeidler. Seminal paper that introduces the concepts of left and right ideals, and develops various ideas of modules: direct sums and intersections, residue class modules and isomorphy of modules. First use of the exchange method for proving uniqueness, and first representation of modules as intersections obeying an ascending chain condition.
18	1921	Über eine Arbeit des im Kriege gefallenen K. Hentzelt zur Eliminationstheorie On a Work on Elimination Theory by K. Hentzelt, who Fell in the War^{§}	Jahresbericht der Deutschen Mathematiker-Vereinigung, 30 (Abt. 2), 101	Elimination theory. Preliminary report of the dissertation of Kurt Hentzelt, who died during World War I. The full description of Hentzelt's work came in publication #22.
19	1921	Idealtheorie in Ringbereichen The Theory of Ideals in Ring Domains^{§}	Mathematische Annalen, 83, 24–66	Ideals. Considered by many mathematicians to be Noether's most important paper. In it, Noether shows the equivalence of the ascending chain condition with previous concepts such as Hilbert's theorem of a finite ideal basis. She also shows that any ideal that satisfies this condition can be represented as an intersection of primary ideals, which are a generalization of the einartiges Ideal defined by Richard Dedekind. Noether also defines irreducible ideals and proves four uniqueness theorems by the exchange method, as in publication #17.
20	1922	Ein algebraisches Kriterium für absolute Irreduzibilität An Algebraic Criterion for Absolute Irreducibility^{§}	Mathematische Annalen, 85, 26–33	
21	1922	Formale Variationsrechnung und Differentialinvarianten Formal Calculus of Variations and Differential Invariants^{§}	Encyklopädie der math. Wiss., III, 3, E, 68–71 (in: R. Weitzenböck, Differentialinvarianten)	
22	1923	Zur Theorie der Polynomideale und Resultanten On the Theory of Polynomial Ideals and Resultants^{§}	Mathematische Annalen, 88, 53–79	Elimination theory. Based on the dissertation of Kurt Hentzelt, who died before this paper was presented. In this work, and in publications #24 and #25, Noether subsumes elimination theory within her general theory of ideals.
23	1923	Algebraische und Differentialinvarianten Algebraic and Differential Invariants^{§}	Jahresbericht der Deutschen Mathematiker-Vereinigung, 32, 177–184	
24	1923	Eliminationstheorie und allgemeine Idealtheorie Elimination Theory and the General Ideal Theory^{§}	Mathematische Annalen, 90, 229–261	Elimination theory. Based on the dissertation of Kurt Hentzelt, who died before this paper was presented. In this work, and in publications #24 and #25, Noether subsumes elimination theory within her general theory of ideals.
25	1924	Eliminationstheorie und Idealtheorie Elimination Theory and Ideal Theory^{§}	Jahresbericht der Deutschen Mathematiker-Vereinigung, 33, 116–120	Elimination theory. Based on the dissertation of Kurt Hentzelt, who died before this paper was presented. In this work, and in publications #24 and #25, Noether subsumes elimination theory within her general theory of ideals. She developed a final proof during a lecture in 1923/1924. When her colleague van der Waerden developed the same proof independently (but working from her publications), Noether allowed him to publish.
26	1924	Abstrakter Aufbau der Idealtheorie im algebraischen Zahlkörper Abstract Structure of the Theory of Ideals in Algebraic Number Fields^{§}	Jahresbericht der Deutschen Mathematiker-Vereinigung, 33, 102	
27	1925		Hilbert Counts in the Theory of Ideals^{§}	

| Jahresbericht der Deutschen Mathematiker-Vereinigung, 34 (Abt. 2), 101 || |- | 28 || 1926 || Ableitung der Elementarteilertheorie aus der Gruppentheorie]

Derivation of the Theory of Elementary Divisors from Group Theory^{§}

| Jahresbericht der Deutschen Mathematiker-Vereinigung, 34 (Abt. 2), 104 || |- | 29 || 1925 || Gruppencharaktere und Idealtheorie

Group Characters and the Theory of Ideals^{§}

| Jahresbericht der Deutschen Mathematiker-Vereinigung, 34 (Abt. 2), 144 || Group representations, modules and ideals. First of four papers showing the close connection between these three subjects. See also publications #32, #33, and #35. |- | 30 || 1926 || Der Endlichkeitssatz der Invarianten endlicher linearer Gruppen der Charakteristik p

Proof of the Finiteness of the Invariants of Finite Linear Groups of Characteristic p^{§}

| Nachrichten der Königlichen Gesellschaft der Wissenschaften zu Göttingen, Math.-phys. Klasse, 1926, 28–35 || By applying ascending and descending chain conditions to finite extensions of a ring, Noether shows that the algebraic invariants of a finite group are finitely generated even in positive characteristic. |- | 31 || 1926 || Abstrakter Aufbau der Idealtheorie in algebraischen Zahl- und Funktionenkörpern

Abstract Structure of the Theory of Ideals in Algebraic Number Fields and Function Fields^{§}

| Mathematische Annalen, 96, 26–61 || Ideals. Seminal paper in which Noether determined the minimal set of conditions required that a primary ideal be representable as a power of prime ideals, as Richard Dedekind had done for algebraic numbers. Three conditions were required: an ascending chain condition, a dimension condition, and the condition that the ring be integrally closed. |}

== Third epoch (1927–1935) ==
In the third epoch, Emmy Noether focused on non-commutative algebras, and unified much earlier work on the representation theory of groups.

Index	Year	Title and English translation	Journal, volume, pages	Classification and notes
32	1927	Der Diskriminantensatz für die Ordnungen eines algebraischen Zahl- oder Funktionenkörpers The Discriminant theorem for the Orders of an Algebraic Number Field or Function Field^{§}	Journal für die reine und angewandte Mathematik, 157, 82–104	Group representations, modules and ideals. Second of four papers showing the close connection between these three subjects. See also publications #29, #33, and #35.
33	1927	Über minimale Zerfällungskörper irreduzibler Darstellungen On the Minimum Splitting Fields of Irreducible Representations^{§}	Sitzungsberichte der Preussischen Akademie der Wissenschaften, 1927, 221–228	Group representations, modules and ideals. Written with R. Brauer. Third of four papers showing the close connection between these three subjects. See also publications #29, #32, and #35. This paper shows that the splitting fields of a division algebra are embedded in the algebra itself; the splitting fields are maximal commutative subfields either over the algebra, or over a full matrix ring over the algebra.
34	1928	Hyperkomplexe Größen und Darstellungstheorie, in arithmetischer Auffassung Hypercomplex Quantities and the Theory of Representations, from an Arithmetic Perspective^{§}	Atti Congresso Bologna, 2, 71–73	Group representations, modules and ideals. Synopsis of her papers showing the close connection between these three subjects. See also publications #29, #32, #33, and #35.
35	1929	Hyperkomplexe Größen und Darstellungstheorie Hypercomplex Quantities and the Theory of Representations	Mathematische Zeitschrift, 30, 641–692	Group representations, modules and ideals. Final paper of four showing the close connection between these three subjects. See also publications #29, #32, and #33.
36	1929	Über Maximalbereiche von ganzzahligen Funktionen On the Maximal Domains of Integral Functions^{§}	Rec. Soc. Math. Moscou, 36, 65–72	
37	1929	Differents and Ideal Differentiation^{§}	Jahresbericht der Deutschen Mathematiker-Vereinigung, 39 (Abt. 2), 17	
38	1932	Normalbasis bei Körpern ohne höhere Verzweigung Normal Basis in Fields without Higher Ramification^{§}	Journal für die reine und angewandte Mathematik, 167, 147–152	
39	1932	Beweis eines Hauptsatzes in der Theorie der Algebren Proof of a Main Theorem in the Theory of Algebras^{§}	Journal für die reine und angewandte Mathematik, 167, 399–404	Written with R. Brauer and H. Hasse.
40	1932	Hyperkomplexe Systeme in ihren Beziehungen zur kommutativen Algebra und zur Zahlentheorie Hypercomplex Systems in Their Relationship to Commutative Algebra and to Number Theory^{§}	Verhandl. Internat. Math. Kongress Zürich, 1, 189–194	
41	1933	Nichtkommutative Algebren Non-commutative Algebras^{§}	Mathematische Zeitschrift, 37, 514–541	
42	1933	Der Hauptgeschlechtsatz für relativ-galoissche Zahlkörper The Principal Genus Theorem for Relatively Galois Fields of Numbers^{§}	Mathematische Annalen, 108, 411–419	
43	1934	Zerfallende verschränkte Produkte und ihre Maximalordnungen, Exposés mathématiques publiés à la mémoire de J. Herbrand IV Decomposing Crossed Products and Their Maximal Orders, in memory of J. Herbrand IV^{§}	Actualités scient. et industr., 148	
44	1950	Idealdifferentiation und Differente Differents and Ideal Differentiation^{§}	Journal für die reine und angewandte Mathematik, 188, 1–21	

== Bibliography ==
- Brewer JW, Smith MK, eds. (1981). Emmy Noether: A Tribute to Her Life and Work. New York: Marcel Dekker. ISBN 0-8247-1550-0.
- Dick A (1970). Emmy Noether 1882–1935 ((Beihft Nr. 13 zur Zeitschrift Elemente der Mathematik) ed.). Basel: Birkhäuser Verlag. pp. 40–42.
- Kimberling, Clark (1981), "Emmy Noether and Her Influence", in James W. Brewer; Martha K. Smith (eds.), Emmy Noether: A Tribute to Her Life and Work, New York: Marcel Dekker, Inc., pp. 3–61, ISBN 0-8247-1550-0.
- Noether, Emmy (1983), Jacobson, Nathan (ed.), Gesammelte Abhandlungen (Collected Works), Berlin, New York: Springer-Verlag, pp. 773–775, ISBN 978-3-540-11504-5, MR 0703862
