= Charles-Edmond Perrin =

Charles-Edmond Perrin (18 October 1887 – 13 February 1974) was a French medieval historian, a professor at the University of Strasbourg and then the Sorbonne, and a member of the Académie des inscriptions et belles-lettres, of which he became president.

Born in Lorraine, he made a name above all for his basic research in archives concerning the feudal seigneurie in Lorraine and eastern France.

His intellectual biography of his former colleague at Strasbourg and Paris, Marc Bloch, long delayed by Perrin's duties at the Sorbonne, was published in 1948. His most famous pupil was Georges Duby, who absorbed and expanded Perrin's analytical techniques.

== Selected works ==
- Essai sur la fortune immobilière de l'abbaye alsacienne de Marmoutier aux 10e et 11e siècles, (Collection d'études sur l'histoire du droit et des institutions de l'Alsace, 10), 1935
- Recherches sur la seigneurie rurale en Lorraine d'après les plus anciens censiers (IXe-XIIe siècle) (Publications de la Faculté des lettres de l'Université de Strasbourg, 17) 1935
- L' Allemagne, l'Italie et la Papauté de 1125 a 1250, 1949
- Trois provinces de l'Est: Lorraine, Alsace, Franche-Comté, 1957
- Seigneurie rurale en France et en Allemagne du début du IXe à la fin du XIIe siècle, 1966
