= Paul Eipper =

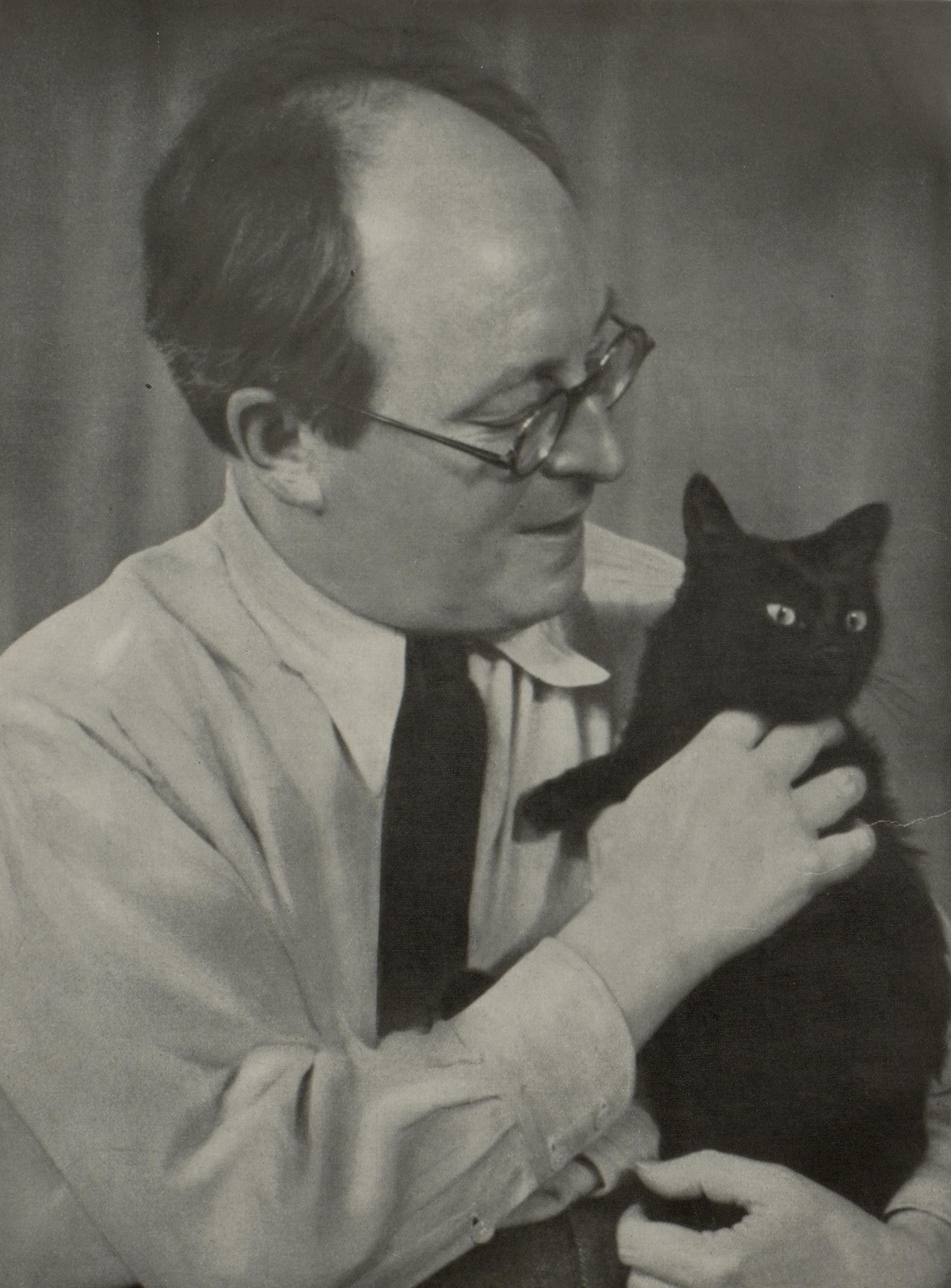
- Born: 10 July 1891; Stuttgart
- Died: 22 July 1964 (aged 73)

Paul Eipper (10 July 1891 – 22 July 1964) was a German artist, film-maker, book publisher, and writer who published several popular books on animals, both pets and wild. His books dealt with the sentience and character of animals.

== Life and work ==
Eipper was born in Stuttgart in a family of farmers and gamekeepers from the Württemberg region. He grew up with a close connection to nature. He studied at the Wilhelms-Oberrealschule but did not complete and joined the book trade as an apprentice. He became interested in animals through his relative Adolf Nill (1861–1945) who ran the Nills zoo in Stuttgart. In 1910 he moved to Munich and received a degree in art and painting. In 1912 he moved into the book publishing business. He served in World War I from 1915 to 1917 and then joined Samuel Fischer's publishing company serving as a private secretary to Fischer, later becoming its managing director. He joined Fritz-Gurlitt-Verlag in 1928 and later returned to Fischer Verlag. As a publisher he was in close contact with many authors including Max Liebermann (1874–1935), Oskar Kokoschka (1886–1980), Gerhart Hauptmann (1862–1946), Alfred Döblin (1878–1957) and Heinrich Zille (1858–1929). Along with photographer Hedda Walther (1894–1979) he published his first book “Tiere Sehen dich an” [Animals looking at you] in 1928. It was very popular and went into several editions. He also made a film in 1943–44. Another major work was “Die gelbe Dogge Senta” [The yellow great dane Senta] (1936). He was a member of the Reichsschrifttumskammer from 1935 and his work was promoted by the Nazi government. He worked with the photographer Hein Gorny (1904–1967) who emigrated to the US during the Nazi era as he married a woman of Jewish descent. Eipper distanced himself from Gorny during the Nazi era. After the war he gave radio shows on pets for children. He was awarded a Federal Cross of Merit in 1956 and in 1961 he received an honorary veterinary degree from the University of Giessen.
