= Frank Bruno (writer) =

New Zealand soldier, boxer, cartoonist and writer

Albert Francis St Bruno (1910—12 July 1967) was a New Zealand soldier, boxer, cartoonist, and writer.

Bruno was born in Sydney, Australia and moved to New Zealand as a child. He had an early career as a boxer, winning the Auckland amateur flyweight championship in 1930, and the bantamweight and flyweight championships in 1932. During the Great depression he travelled around Australia, working as a freelance writer and as a professional boxer. He enlisted in the New Zealand army at the outbreak of the second world war, serving as a machine-gunner in the first echelon of the 2nd New Zealand Division in both the Greece and Crete campaigns. He was wounded in action in December 1941.

On his return to New Zealand he wrote articles for the Auckland Star and published several books of cartoons and stories about his war experiences. In 1959 he published his first novel, The Hellbuster, a historical action novel set in the Bay of Islands. This was followed in 1960 by Black Noon at Ngutu, set in the Taranaki Wars, described as "a sadistic blood-and-guts yarn of the tough he-man type", and several other adventure novels. He also worked as a cartoonist, illustrating works by Hori. He died in 1967 after a long illness.

== Published works ==
- Desert Daze (1944)
- Maleesh George (1946)
- As a matter of fact (1950)
- The Hellbuster (1959)
- Black Noon at Ngutu (1960)
- Twenty years after (1961)
- Fury at Finnegan’s Folly (1962)
- The Black Pearl (1962)
- Cockeye Kerrigan (1963)
- Yellow Jack's Island (1963)
- Riggermortis (1966)

== Awards ==
- War Medal 1939–1945
- New Zealand War Service Medal
