= Ümera jõel =

1934 novel by Mait Metsanurk

- Cover of 1961 published version
- Author: Mait Metsanurk
- Language: Estonian
- Publication place: Estonia

Ümera jõel (English: At the Ümera River) is a novel by Estonian author Mait Metsanurk, first published in 1934.

== Plot ==
The novel is set during the Baltic Crusades in the early 13th century, in the fictional parish of Mägiste located in South Estonia. It features an Estonian victory over German knights in the Battle of Ümera and the preceding Battle of Cēsis.

== See also ==
- Battle of Ümera
