= Hein Gorny =

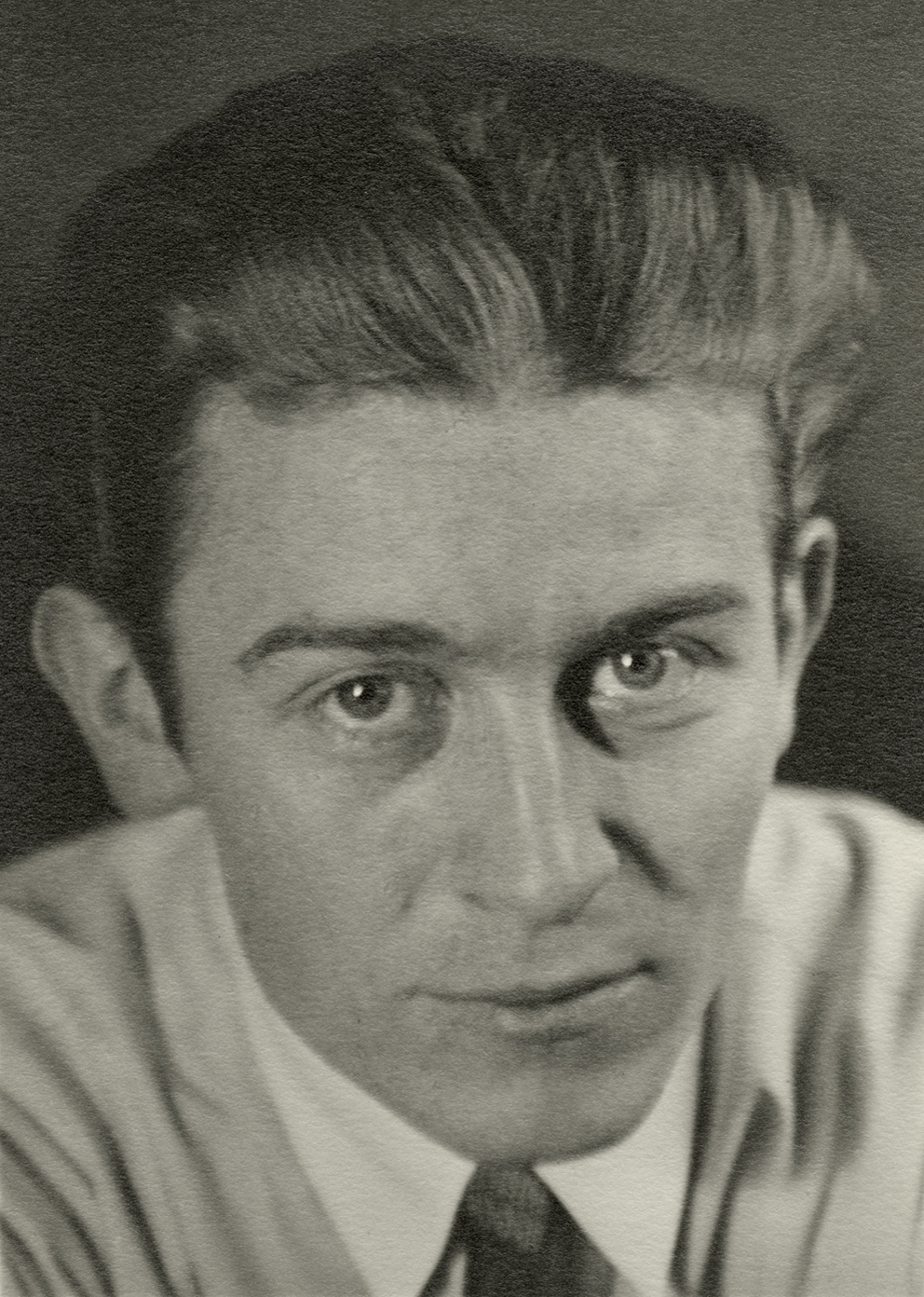
Self-portrait, 1930

Hein Gorny (12 April 1904 – 14 June 1967) was a German commercial photographer who worked on a range of subjects and themes. He was best known for his industrial and advertising photography. He was a self-taught pioneer artistic photographer in the New Objectivity movement. He left Germany for the United States following persecution of his wife, who was of Jewish ancestry, by the Nazi regime.

== Life and work ==
Gorny was born in Witten and left his hometown after apprenticing as a carpenter briefly. He moved to Berlin where he worked for Philip Holzmann as a carpenter and then as a seller of gramophone discs. In the 1920s he joined a circle of artists and thinkers called the "Kröpcke Circle" which included Kurt Schwitters, Erich Maria Remarque, and Paul Steegemann. He went on photographic trips into Italy and North Africa with Hanns Krenz of the Kestner Society and some of these were published in the Hannoversche Anzeiger in 1924. In 1925 he made portraits of Theodor Lessing and in 1932, he married Ruth, the daughter of Lessing. He became a friend of Otto Umbehr, and in 1929 he held a photo exhibition as part of the German Werkbund. His photographs became well-known and by the 1930s he was widely recognized as a major photographer. He worked with industries on advertising and marketing materials and was particularly famous for his work with textile company Bemberg, the wallpaper company Norta, Blaupunkt Radio and AEG. He also travelled widely including to the USSR with Erich Ohser and Erich Kästner. From 1933 to 1936 he was in Berlin and collaborated with Paul Eipper for books on animals. In 1933, his father-in-law was killed by the Nazis for being of Jewish descent. He took over Lotte Jacobi's studio in Berlin after Jacobi emigrated to the US. The Reich Press Chamber wished him to divorce his wife but he refused and along with his wife he went to the US in 1938. Ruth was denied a residence permit and he was forced to return to Germany in 1939. He was declared unfit for military duty due to his Jewish wife and exempted from conscription. Despite various restrictions, he was able to continued to work. He divorced Ruth in 1945 and married a studio assistant. The couple were held prisoners by Soviet army in April-May 1945. He divorced and remarried Ruth after being released and divorced her again in 1946. His last project was on photographing Berlin from the air along with Adolph Carl Byers for a book titled "In Memoriam" but this did not happen. He had become addicted to Pervitin and this affected his work and life in the last two decades and from 1954 he was institutionalized in the Ilten Sanatorium. He died following injuries from a fire in Hanover.
