= Emil Schovánek =

Czech painter (1885–1947)

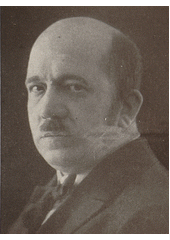
- Photographic portrait
- Born: 10 September 1885; Czech Republic, Prague
- Died: 11 July 1947 (aged 61); Czech Republic, Prague
- Education: Prague Academy of Fine Arts
- Occupation: Painter

Emil Schovánek (10 September 1885 – 11 July 1947) was a Czech painter.

== Life ==
Emil Schovánek was born in Prague (then part of Austria-Hungary) on 10 September 1885. He studied at the Prague Academy of Fine Arts from 1903 to 1909. He undertook a study trip from 1911 to 1913 in Yugoslavia, Italy and France. He died in Prague on 11 July 1947, aged 61.

== Gallery ==
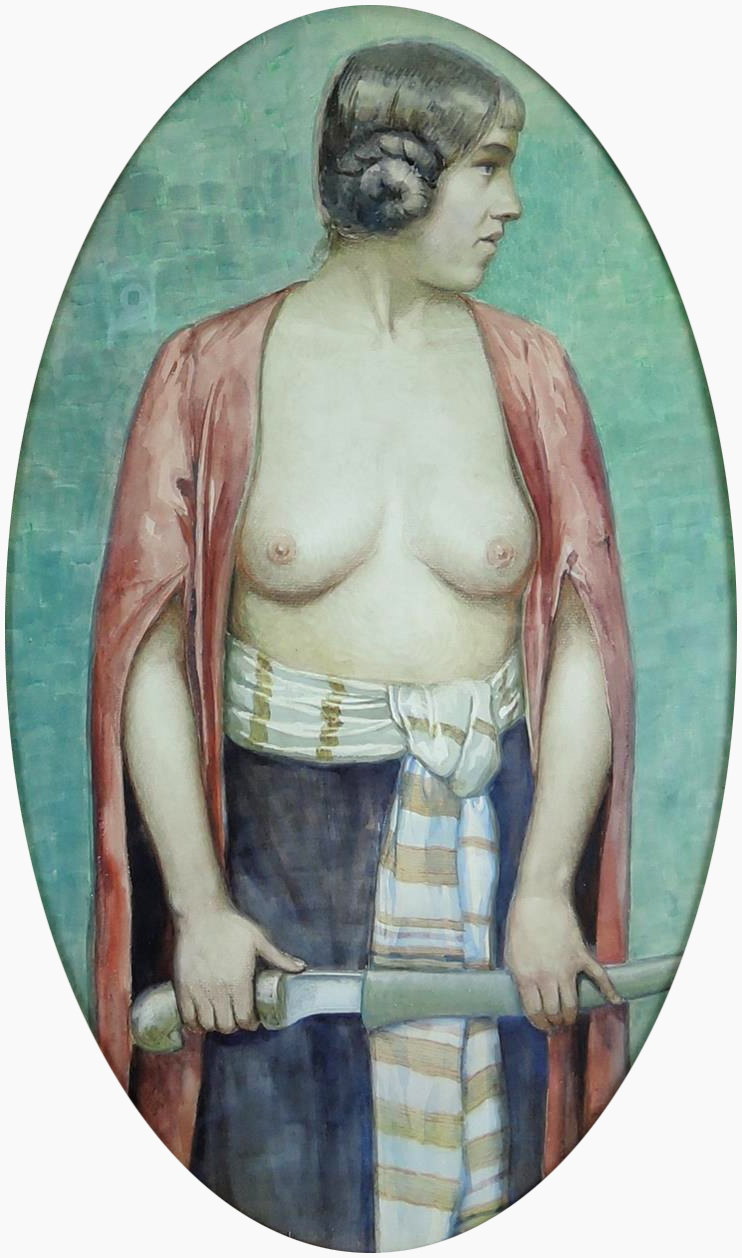
Germánie (1906)

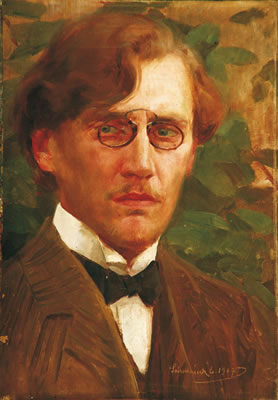
Autoportrét (c. 1917)

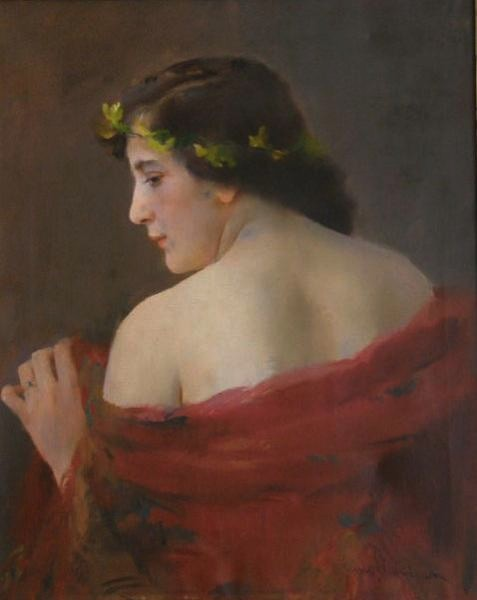
Portrét ženy (c. 1920)

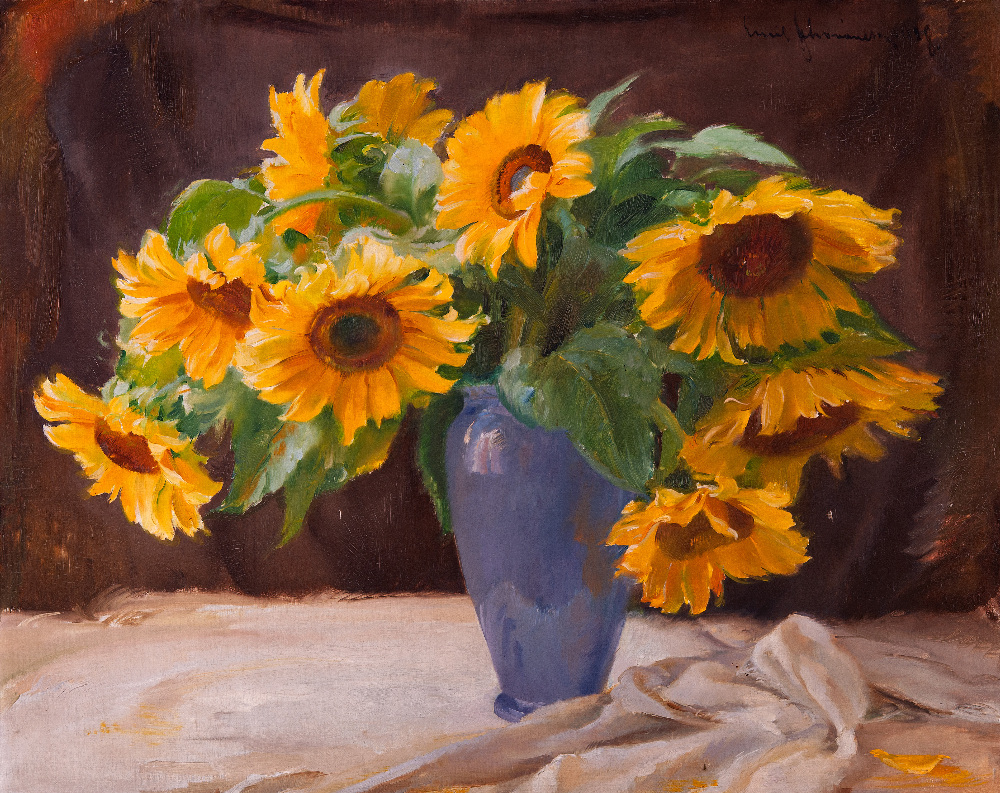
Zátiší slunečnice (1928)

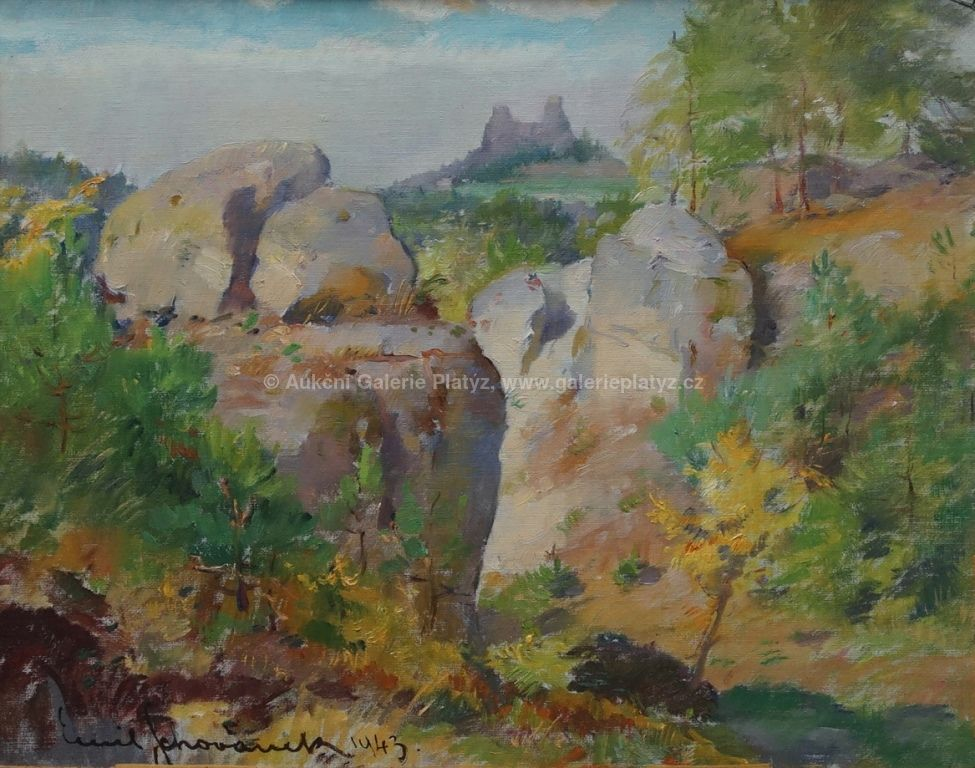
Trosky (1943)

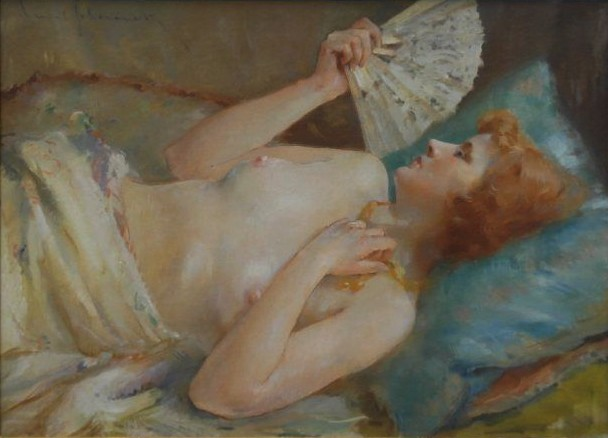
Dívka z vějířem

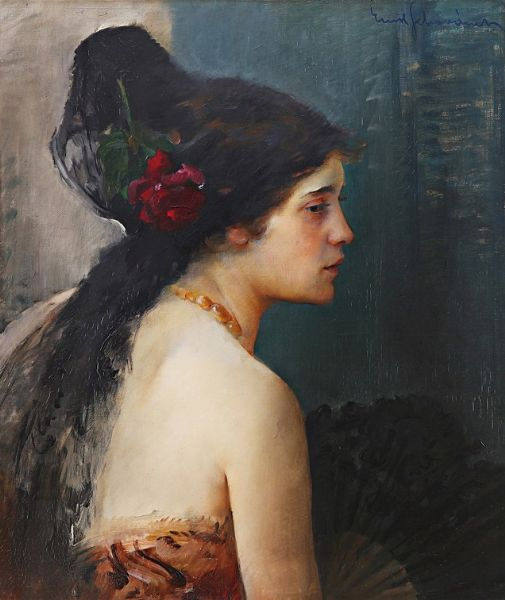
Dívka z růží ve vlasech

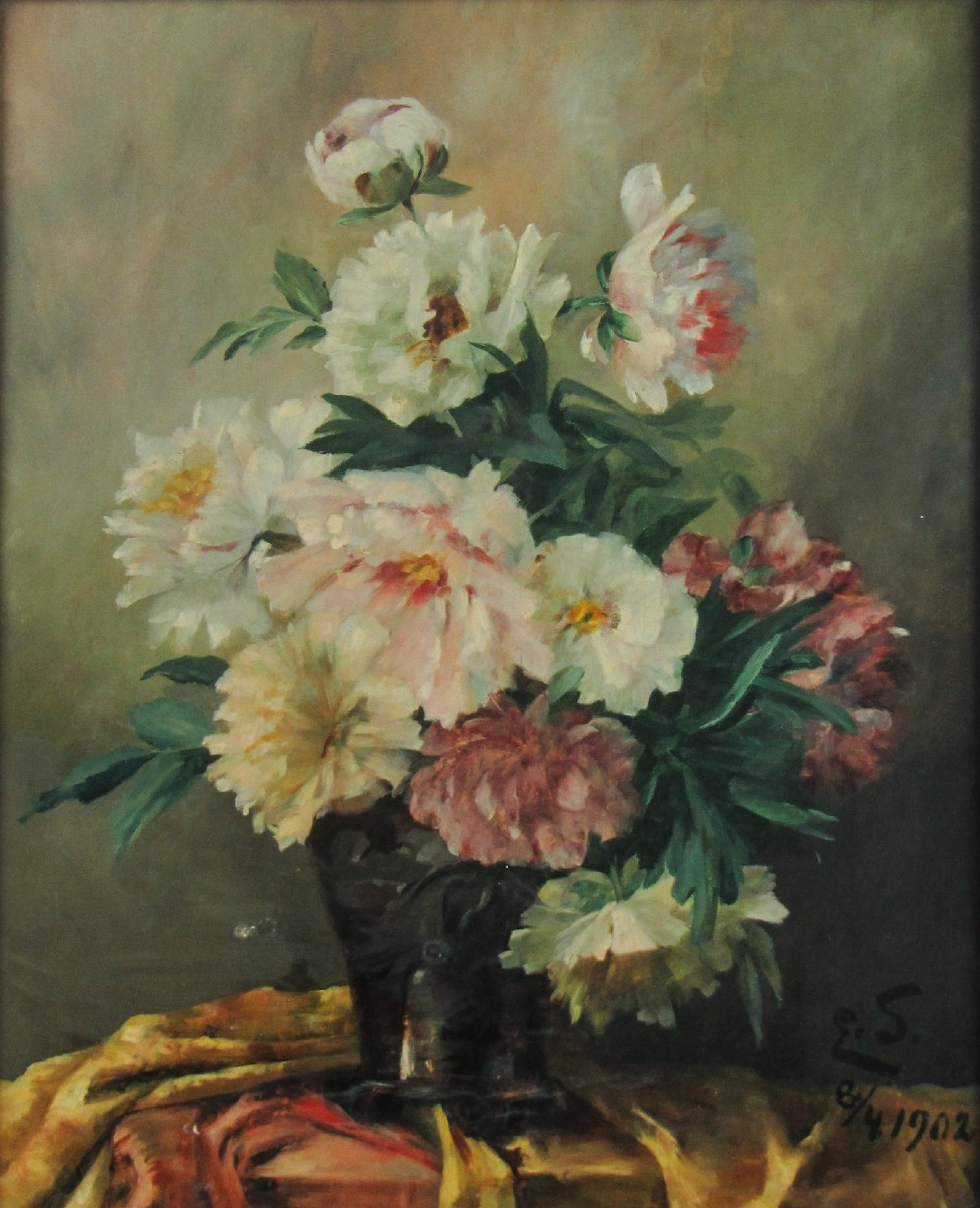
Květiny ve váze

== Sources ==
- Beyer, Andreas; Savoy, Bénédicte; Tegethoff, Wolf, eds. (2021). "Schovánek, Emil". In Allgemeines Künstlerlexikon - Internationale Künstlerdatenbank - Online. K. G. Saur. Retrieved 8 October 2022.
