= Augustin Bernard =

Augustin Alexis Bernard (1865–1947) was a French colonial geographer and historian.

== Life ==
Bernard was born on 26 August 1865 in Chaumont-sur-Tharonne (Loir-et-Cher) on 26 August 1865. He studied at the University of Paris, graduating Licentiate of Letters (1883), Licentiate of Law (1887), and Agrégé of History and Geography (1889). After briefly teaching at the Lycée of Lorient he wrote a doctoral thesis on Adam of Bremen (graduating Doctor of Letters in 1895).

He became lecturer on African geography at the École supérieure des lettres d'Alger in 1894 and professor in 1896. In 1902 he was appointed to a lectureship in Paris on the Geography and Colonization of the Peoples of North Africa that had been created specifically for him, becoming a professor in 1920.

He died in Bourbon-l'Archambault (Allier) on 29 December 1947.

== Publications ==
- L'Archipel de la Nouvelle Calédonie (1894)
- with Emile Ficheur, Les Régions Naturelles de l'Algérie (1906)
- Les Confins algéro-marocains (1911)

== Honours and awards ==
- Officer of the Légion d'Honneur
