= André Chevrillon =

French writer (1864–1957)

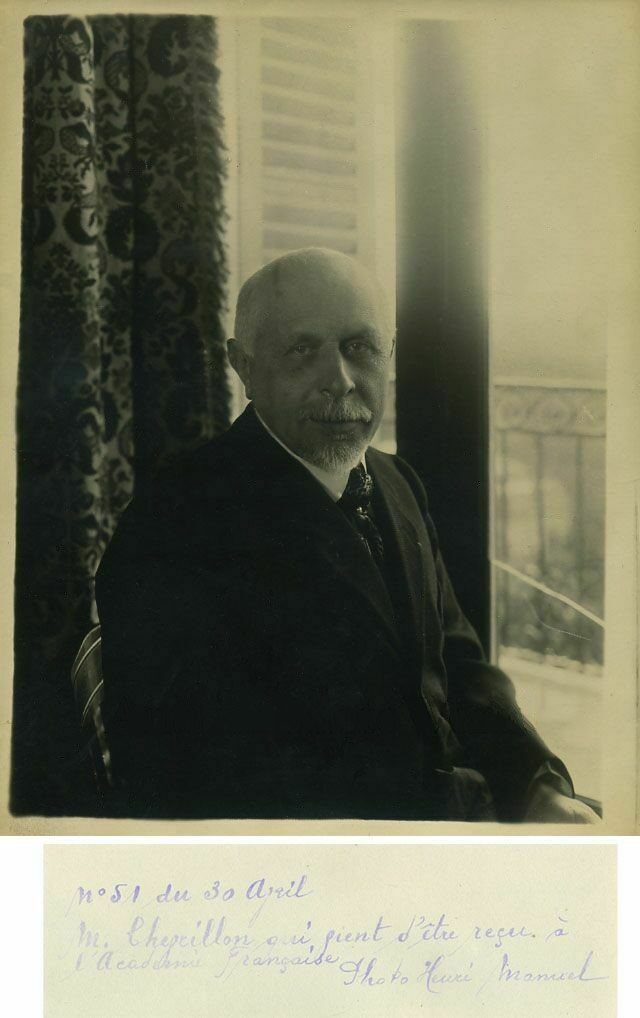

André Chevrillon (3 May 1864 – 9 July 1957) was a French writer, a nephew of Hippolyte Taine, who chose England and the Orient as objects of study.

Chevrillon was born at Ruelle (Charente), and educated at the University College School (London), the École alsacienne (Paris), the Lycée Louis-le-Grand, and the University of Paris. He was a professor of English at the École Navale of Brest in 1887–1888, and from 1889 to 1894 was Maître de conférences at the Faculty of Letters of the University of Lille. He was with the British Army at the front during the War, and afterward (1921) was received in the Académie française. His writings fall into two distinct classes: impressions of travel, and critical essays on England and English literature.

Besides many articles in the Revue de Paris and the Revue des deux mondes his works include:

- Dans l'Inde (1891; English translation, Romantic India)
- Sydney Smith et la renaissance des idées libérales en Angleterre au 19e siècle (thesis, 1894)
- Terres mortes (1897)
- Études anglaises (1901)
- Un Crépuscule d'Islam (1906)
- La Pensée de Ruskin (1909)
- Nouvelles études anglaises (1910)
- L'Angleterre et la guerre (1917; English translation, Britain and the War, with a preface by Rudyard Kipling)
- Près des combattants (1919)
- Marrakech dans les palmes (1920)
- Les Américains à Brest (1920; with a preface by Owen Wister)
- Trois études de littérature anglaise (Kipling, Shakespeare, Galsworthy) (1921; English translation, 1923)
- La Mer dans les bois (1928)
- André Dauchez (1955)
