= List of scientific publications by John von Neumann =

John von Neumann (1903–1957) was a Hungarian-American mathematician, physicist, computer scientist, engineer and polymath. He had perhaps the widest coverage of any mathematician of his time, integrating pure and applied sciences and making major contributions to many fields, including mathematics, physics, economics, computing, and statistics. He was a pioneer of the application of operator theory to quantum mechanics in the development of functional analysis, the development of game theory and the concepts of cellular automata, the universal constructor and the digital computer. His analysis of the structure of self-replication preceded the discovery of the structure of DNA.

== Books authored / coauthored ==
- 1932. Mathematical Foundations of Quantum Mechanics: New Edition, Wheeler, N. A., Ed., Beyer, R. T., Trans., Princeton University Press, available here. 2018 edition: ISBN 9780691178561
- 1937. Continuous Geometry, Halperin, I., Preface, Princeton Landmarks in Mathematics and Physics, Princeton University Press, online at archive.org. 2016 edition: ISBN 9781400883950 MR 0120174
- 1937. Continuous Geometries with a Transition Probability, Halperin, I., Preface, Memoirs of the American Mathematical Society Vol. 34, No. 252, 1981 edition. ISBN 978-1-4704-0659-2 MR 0634656
- 1941. Invariant Measures. American Mathematical Society. 1999 edition: ISBN 978-0-8218-0912-9
- 1944. Theory of Games and Economic Behavior, with Morgenstern, O., Princeton University Press, online at archive.org or here. 2007 edition: ISBN 9781400829460
- 1950. Functional Operators, Volume 1: Measures and Integrals. Annals of Mathematics Studies 21, online at archive.org. 2016 edition: ISBN 9781400881895
- 1951. Functional Operators, Volume 2: The Geometry of Orthogonal Spaces. Annals of Mathematics Studies 22, online at archive.org. 2016 edition ISBN 9781400882250
- 1958. The Computer and the Brain, Kurzweil, R. Preface, The Silliman Memorial Lectures Series, Yale University Press, online at archive.org or here. 2012 edition: ISBN 9780300181111
- 1966. Theory of Self-Reproducing Automata, Burks, A. W., Ed., University of Illinois Press. ISBN 0-598-37798-0

== Scholarly articles ==
- 1923. On the introduction of transfinite numbers, (in German), Acta Szeged, 1:199-208.
- 1925. An axiomatization of set theory, (in German), J. f. Math., 154:219-240.
- 1926. On the Prüfer theory of ideal numbers, (in German), Acta Szeged, 2:193-227.
- 1927. On Hilbert's proof theory, (in German), Math. Zschr., 26:1-46.
- 1929. General eigenvalue theory of Hermitian functional operators, (in German), Math. Ann., 102:49-131.
- 1932. Proof of the Quasi-Ergodic Hypothesis, Proc. Nat. Acad. Sci., 18:70-82.
- 1932. Physical Applications of the Ergodic Hypothesis, Proc. Nat. Acad. Sci., 18:263-266.
- 1932. On the operator method in classical mechanics, (in German), Ann. Math., 33:587-642.
- 1934. On an Algebraic Generalization of the Quantum Mechanical Formalism, with P. Jordan and E. Wigner, Ann. Math., 35:29-64.
- 1936. On Rings of Operators, with F. J. Murray, Ann. Math., 37:116-229.
- 1936. On an Algebraic Generalization of the Quantum Mechanical Formalism (Part I), Mat. Sborn., 1:415-484.
- 1936. The Logic of Quantum Mechanics, with G. Birkhoff, Ann. Math., 37:823-843.
- 1936. Continuous Geometry, Proc. Nat. Acad. Sci., 22:92-100.
- 1936. Examples of Continuous Geometries, Proc. Nat. Acad. Sci., 22:101-108.
- 1936. On Regular Rings, Proc. Nat. Acad. Sci., 22:707-713.
- 1937. On Rings of Operators, II, with F. J. Murray, Trans. Amer. Math. Soc., 41:208-248.
- 1937. Continuous Rings and Their Arithmetics, Proc. Nat. Acad. Sci., 23:341-349.
- 1938. On Infinite Direct Products, Compos. Math., 6:1-77.
- 1940. On Rings of Operators, III, Ann. Math., 41:94-161.
- 1942. Operator Methods in Classical Mechanics, II, with P. R. Halmos, Ann. Math., 43:332-350.
- 1943. On Rings of Operators, IV, with F. J. Murray, Ann. Math., 44:716-808.
- 1945. A Model of General Economic Equilibrium, Rev. Econ. Studies, 13:1-9.
- 1945. First Draft of a Report on the EDVAC, Report prepared for the U.S. Army Ordnance Department and the University of Pennsylvania, under Contract W670-ORD-4926, June 30, Summary Report No. 2, ed. by J. P. Eckert, J. W. Mauchly and S. R. Warren, July 10. [The typescript original of this report has been re-edited by M. D. Godrey: IEEE Ann. Hist. Comp., Vol 15, No. 4, 1993, 27-75].
- 1947. Numerical Inverting of Matrices of High Order, with H. H. Goldstine, Bull. Amer. Math. Soc., 53:1021-1099.
- 1948. The General and Logical Theory of Automata, in Cerebral Mechanisms in Behavior - The Hixon Symposium, Jeffress, L.A. ed., John Wiley & Sons, New York, N. Y, 1951, pp. 1–31, MR0045446.
- 1949. On Rings of Operators. Reduction Theory, Ann. Math., 50:401-485.
- 1950. A Method for the Numerical Calculation of Hydrodynamic Shocks, with R. D. Richtmyer, J. Appl. Phys., 21:232-237.
- 1950. Numerical Integration of the Barotropic Vorticity Equation, with J. G. Charney and R. Fjörtoft, Tellus, 2:237-254.
- 1951. A spectral theory for general operators of a unitary space, (in German), Math. Nachr., 4:258-281.
- 1951. Discussion on the Existence and Uniqueness or Multiplicity of Solutions of the Aerodynamical Equations, Chapter 10 of Problems of Cosmical Aerodynamics, Proceedings of the Symposium on the Motion of Gaseous Masses of Cosmical Dimensions held in Paris, August 16–19, 1949.
- 1951. Various Techniques Used in Connection with Random Digits, Chapter 13 of "Proceedings of Symposium on 'Monte Carlo Method'", held June–July 1949 in Los Angeles, Summary written by G. E. Forsynthe.
- 1956. Probabilistic Logics and the Synthesis of Reliable Organisms from Unreliable Components, January 1952, Calif. Inst. of Tech., Lecture notes taken by R. S. Pierce and revised by the author, Automata Studies, ed. by C. E. Shannon and J. McCarthy, Princeton University Press, 43–98.

== Popular articles ==
- 1947. The Mathematician, The Works of the Mind. ed. by R. B. Heywood, University of Chicago Press, 180–196.
- 1951. The Future of High-Speed Computing, Digest of an address at the IBM Seminar on Scientific Computation, November 1949, Proc. Comp. Sem., IBM, 13.
- 1954. The Role of Mathematics in the Sciences and in Society. Address at 4th Conference of Association of Princeton Graduate Alumni, June, 16–29.
- 1954. The NORC and Problems in High Speed Computing, Address on the occasion of the first public showing of the IBM Naval Ordnance Research Calculator, December 2.
- 1955. Method in the Physical Sciences, The Unity of Knowledge, ed. by L. Leary, Doubleday, 157–164.
- 1955. Can We Survive Technology? Fortune, June.
- 1955. Impact of Atomic Energy on the Physical and Chemical Sciences, Speech at M.I.T. Alumni Day Symposium, June 13, Summary, Tech. Rev. 15–17.
- 1955. Defense in Atomic War, Paper delivered at a symposium in honor of Dr. R. H. Kent, December 7, 1955, The Scientific Bases of Weapons, Journ. Am. Ordnance Assoc., 21–23.
- 1956. The Impact of Recent Developments in Science on the Economy and on Economics, Partial text of a talk at the National Planning Assoc., Washington, D.C., December 12, 1955, Looking Ahead, 4:11.

== Collected works ==
Von Neumann's collected works were published as a six-volume set, edited by Abraham H. Taub and printed by Pergamon Press.

- 1961. Volume I: Logic, Theory of Sets and Quantum Mechanics
- 1961. Volume II: Operators, Ergodic Theory and Almost Periodic Functions in a Group
- 1961. Volume III: Rings of Operators
- 1962. Volume IV: Continuous Geometry and other topics
- 1963. Volume V: Design of Computers, Theory of Automata and Numerical Analysis
- 1963. Volume VI: Theory of Games, Astrophysics, Hydrodynamics and Meteorology
