= List of burials at Montparnasse Cemetery =

Among those interred at the Montparnasse Cemetery in Paris are:

== A ==
- Henri Alekan (1909–2001), cinematographer
- Alexander Alekhine (1892–1946), Russian-born chess world champion
- Grace Alekhine (1876–1956), artist and chess master
- Michèle Arnaud (1919–1998), singer
- Henry Aron (1842–1885), journalist and political essayist
- Raymond Aron (1905–1983), philosopher, sociologist and political scientist
- Jean-Michel Atlan (1913–1960), poet and painter
- Tina Aumont (1946–2006), actress, daughter of Jean-Pierre Aumont and Maria Montez
- Georges Auric (1899–1983), composer, member of Les Six

== B ==
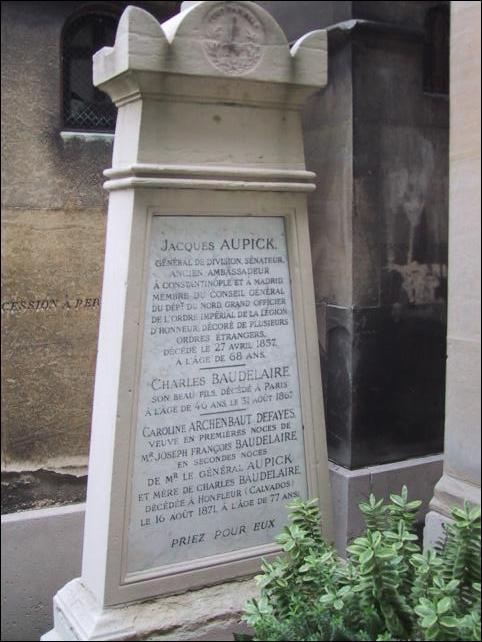
Tomb of Charles Baudelaire.

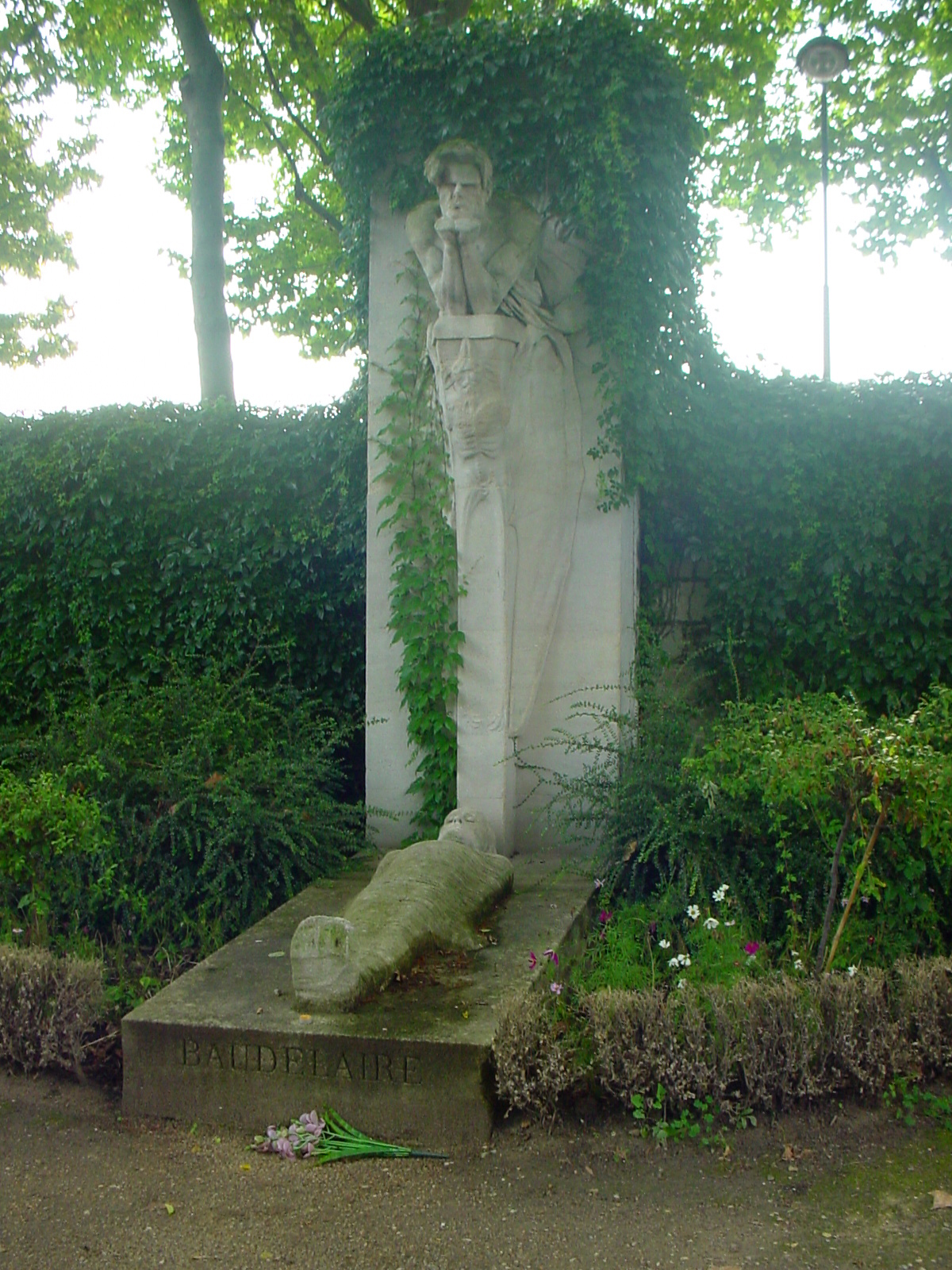
Charles Baudelaire monument.

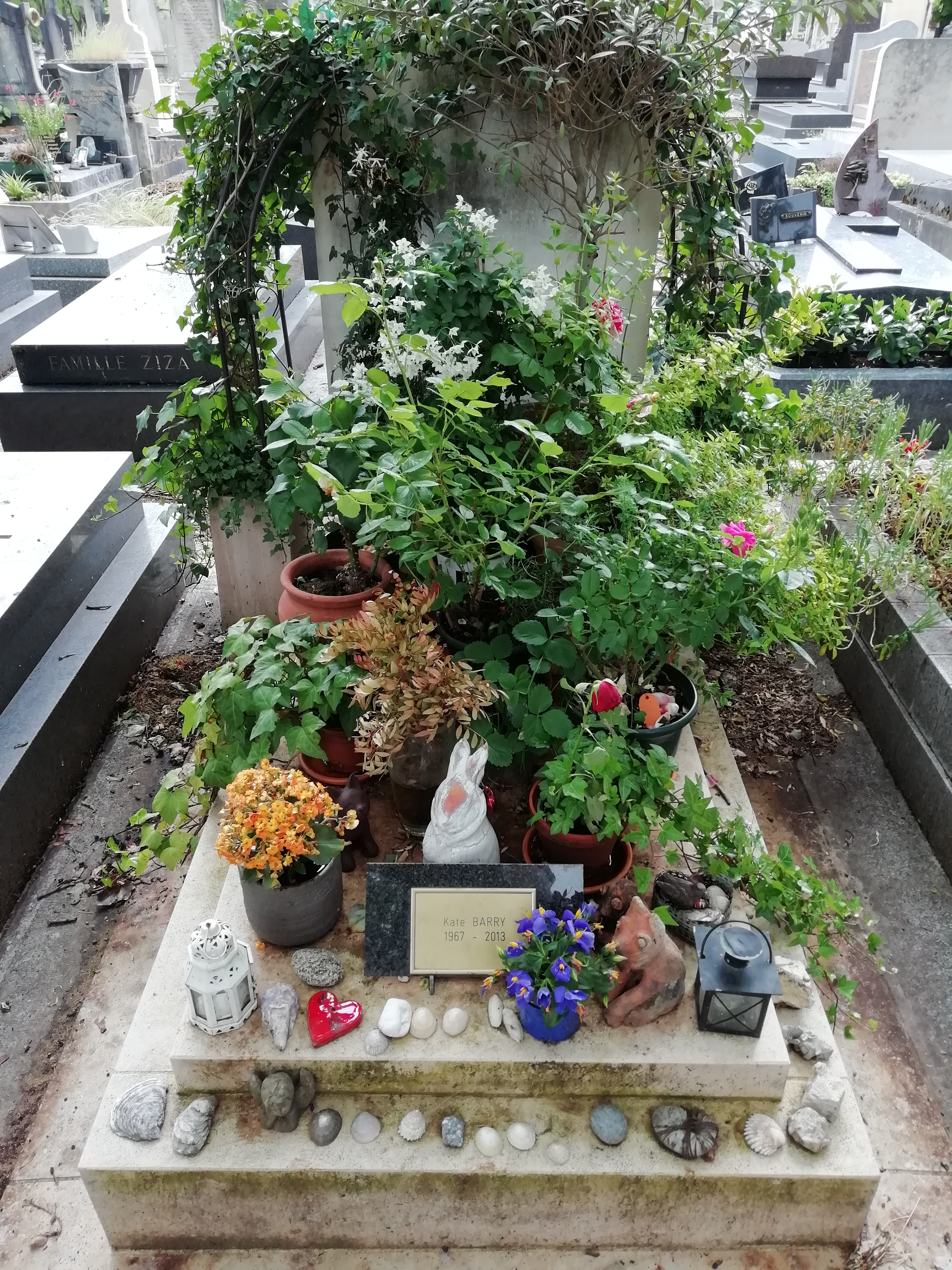
Tomb of Kate Barry and Jane Birkin

- Shapour Bakhtiar (1914–1991), last prime minister of the constitutional monarchy in Iran
- César Baldaccini (1921–1988), sculptor
- Théodore de Banville (1823–1891), poet, writer
- Frédéric Bartholdi (1834–1904), sculptor of the Statue of Liberty (Liberty Enlightening the World)
- Maryse Bastié (1898–1952), pioneer aviator
- Pierre Batcheff (1901–1932), actor
- Jane Bathori (1877–1970), opera singer
- Charles Baudelaire (1821–1867), poet
- Jean Baudrillard (1929–2007), French cultural theorist, philosopher, political commentator, and photographer
- Simone de Beauvoir (1908–1986), feminist philosopher and author
- Jacques Becker (1906–1960), filmmaker
- Samuel Beckett (1906–1989), Irish author, playwright and poet
- Eugène Belgrand (1810–1878), civil engineer
- Paul Belmondo (1898–1982), French sculptor
- Jean Béraud (1849–1935), painter
- Emmanuel Berl (1892–1976), writer
- Aloysius Bertrand (1807–1841), poet
- Marcel Alexandre Bertrand (1847–1907), geologist, one of the founders of modern tectonics
- Jean-Marie Beurel (1813–1872), catholic priest
- Gaston Billotte (1875-1940), general, killed in the Battle of France
- Louis Gustave Binger (1856–1936), explorer
- Jane Birkin (1946–2023), English-French actress and singer
- Lucien Bodard (1914–1998), journalist
- Marc Boegner (1881–1970), theologist and academician
- Jean-Marie Bonnassieux (1810–1892), sculptor
- Aristide Boucicaut (1810–1877), entrepreneur and creator of Le Bon Marché chain of department stores
- William-Adolphe Bouguereau (1825–1905), artist (painter in realist style)
- Antoine Jacques Claude Joseph, comte Boulay de la Meurthe (1761–1840), statesman
- Antoine Bourdelle (1861–1921), sculptor and teacher
- Paul Bourget (1852–1935), writer
- Marcel Bozzuffi (1928–1988), actor
- Gérard Brach (1927–2006), screenwriter
- Constantin Brâncuși (1876–1957), Romanian sculptor
- Brassaï (born Gyula Halász) (1899–1984), photographer
- Michel Bréal (1832–1915), linguist, coiner of "semantics," inventor of the marathon
- Paul Broca (1824–1880), physician and anatomist
- Charles-Édouard Brown-Séquard (1817–1894), physician
- Jean Bruller (1902–1991), author who wrote under the nom de plume of Vercors

== C ==
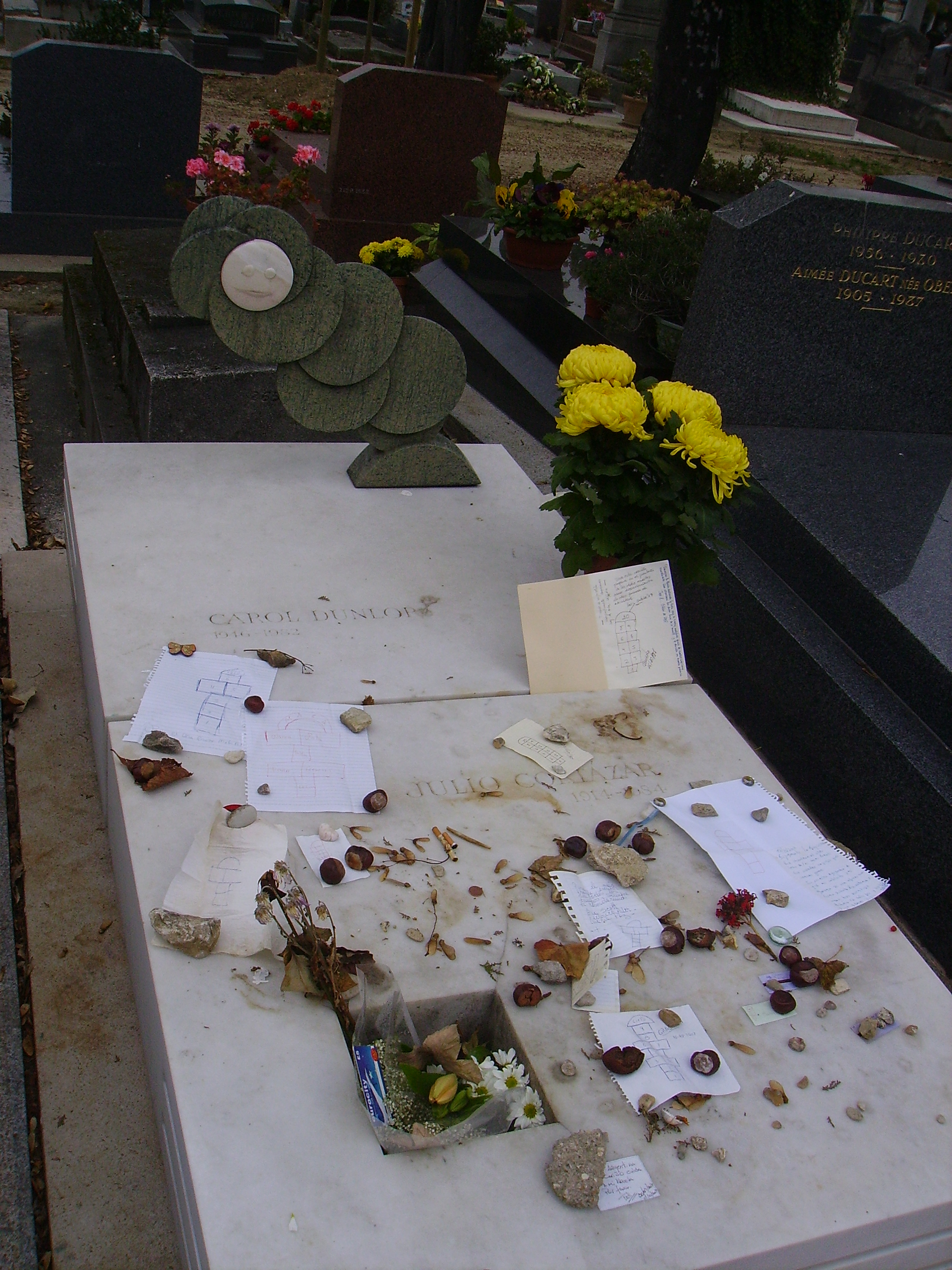
Julio Cortázar's grave.

- René Capitant (1901–1970), lawyer and statesman
- Roger Caillois (1913–1978), author
- Jean Carmet (1920–1994), actor
- Isabelle Caro (1982–2010), model
- Eugène Carrière (1849–1906), Symbolist painter
- Rene Cassin (1887–1976), jurist, Nobel Laureate. His remains were later transferred to the Panthéon.
- Sergio de Castro (artist) (1922–2012), Argentinian painter, musician and poet
- Cornelius Castoriadis (1922–1997), Greek philosopher with French citizenship
- Aristide Cavaillé-Coll (1811–1899), organ builder
- Emmanuel Chabrier (1841–1894), composer
- René de Chambrun (1906–2002), lawyer, businessman.
- Honoré Champion (1846–1913), publisher
- Claude François Chauveau-Lagarde (1756–1841), lawyer, defender of Marie-Antoinette
- Marie-Dominique Chenu (1895–1990), Catholic theologian
- Bernadette Chirac (1933–2026), politician and wife of President of France Jacques Chirac
- Jacques Chirac (1932–2019), politician, Prime Minister of France, Mayor of Paris, President of France, Co-Prince of Andorra
- Emil Cioran (1911–1995), Romanian philosopher
- André Citroën (1878–1935), founded France's Citroën automobile factory
- Antoni Clavé (1913–2005), artist
- Yves Congar (1904–1995), Catholic theologian
- Nicolas-Jacques Conté (1755 - 1805), inventor of the modern pencil.
- François Coppée (1842–1908), poet and novelist
- Gaspard-Gustave Coriolis (1792–1843), mathematician
- Margaret Cossaceanu-Lavrillier (1893–1980), sculptor
- Julio Cortázar (1914–1984), Argentine writer
- Antoine Augustin Cournot (1801–1877), economist
- Maurice Couve de Murville (1907–1999), former Prime Minister of France
- Bruno Cremer (1929–2010), actor
- Adolphe Crémieux (1796–1880), lawyer and statesman
- Charles Cros (1842–1888), poet and inventor

== D ==
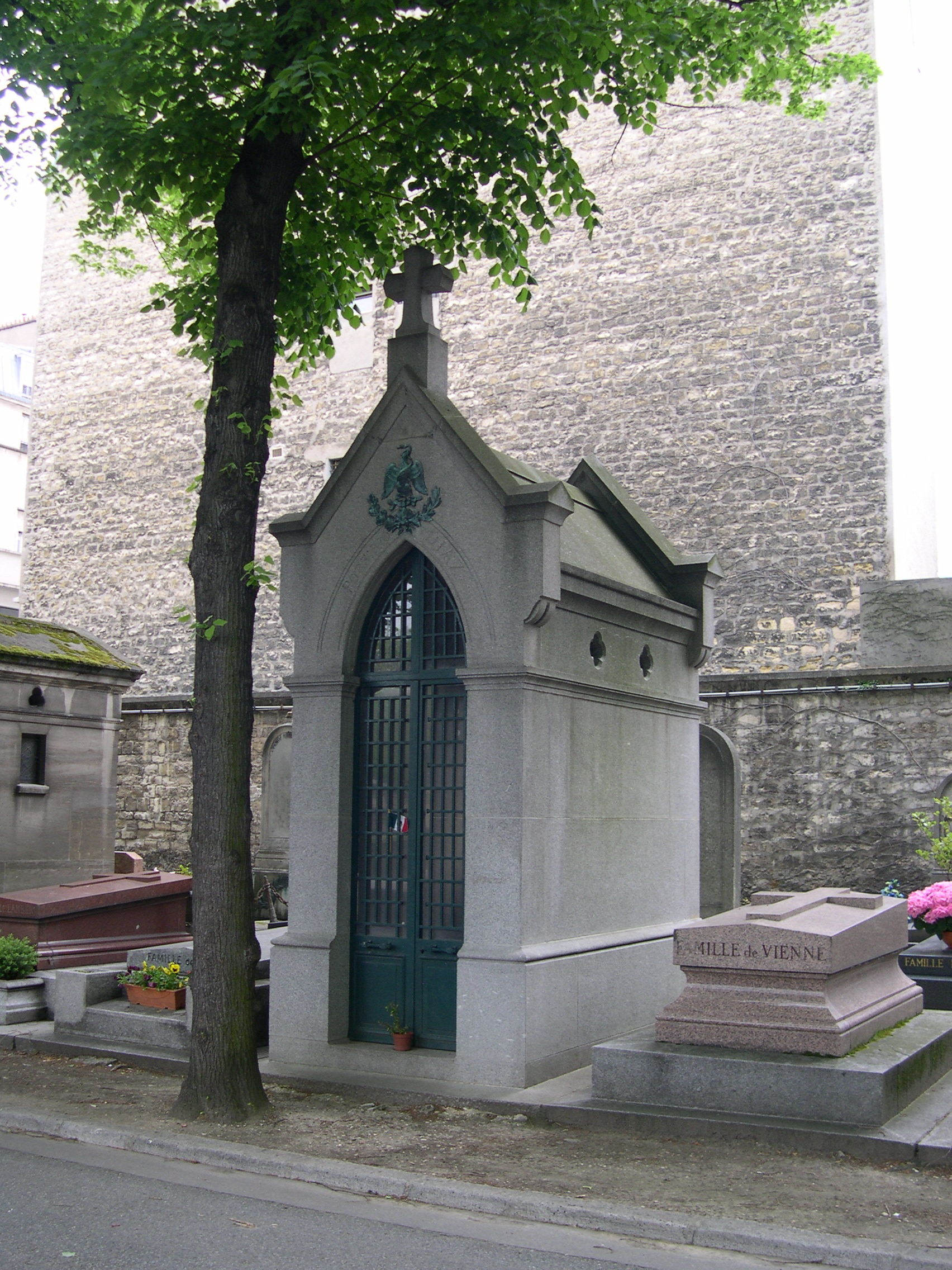
Tomb of Porfirio Díaz at Montparnasse Cemetery, Paris

- Jules Dalou (1838–1902), sculptor
- Mireille Darc (1938–2017), model and actress
- Gabriel Davioud (1824–1881), architect
- Pierre David-Weill (1900–1975), banker, Chairman of Lazard Frères
- Suzanne Dechevaux-Dumesnil (1900–1989), lover and, later, wife of Samuel Beckett
- Jos De Cock (1934–2010), Belgian-French painter, watercolorist, etcher and sculptor and, later, wife of Pierre Restany
- Jacques Demy (1931–1990), filmmaker
- Édouard Deperthes (1833–1898), architect
- Paul Deschanel (1855–1922), former President of France
- Robert Desnos (1900–1945), Surrealist poet
- Porfirio Díaz (1830–1915), longest serving Mexican President, Dictator, General
- Marie Dorval (1798–1849), actress
- Alfred Dreyfus (1859–1935), Jewish military officer falsely accused of treason (the Dreyfus affair)
- Jules Dumont d'Urville (1790–1842), explorer of South Pacific & discoverer of Venus de Milo
- Marguerite Duras (1914–1996), author and movie director
- Émile Durkheim (1858–1917), sociologist
- Henri Dutilleux (1916–2013), composer
- Roland Dyens (1955–2016), guitarist and composer

== E ==
- Émile Egger (1813–1885), philologist
- Robert Enrico (1931–2001), film director
- Antoine Étex (1808–1888), sculptor

== F ==
- Henri Fantin-Latour (1836–1904), artist
- Léon-Paul Fargue (1876–1947), poet and essayist
- Paul Foucher (1810–1875), dramatist and journalist
- César Franck (1822–1890), composer and organist
- Othon Friesz (1879–1949), painter
- Carlos Fuentes (1928–2012), Mexican writer

== G ==
- Serge Gainsbourg (1928–1991), singer and composer
- Évariste Galois (1811–1832), mathematician and revolutionary
- Charles Garnier (1825–1898), designed the original Paris Opera House for Napoleon III
- Henry Gauthier-Villars (1859–1931), writer and first husband of Colette
- François Gérard (1770–1837), artist
- Jean Giraud (1938–2012), illustrator, comic artist, also known as Moebius
- Alexandre Guilmant (1837–1911), organist and composer
- Mavis Gallant (1922–2014), author

== H ==
- Jean Nicolas Pierre Hachette (1769–1834), mathematician
- Clara Haskil (1895–1960), Romanian pianist
- Swan Hennessy (1866–1929), Irish-American composer, and his son Patrice Hennessy (1910–1973), French man of letters
- Pierre-Jules Hetzel (1814–1886), publisher and literary editor
- Jean-Antoine Houdon (1741–1828), famous sculptor of notable men
- Joris-Karl Huysmans (1848–1907), author

== I ==
- Vincent d'Indy (1851–1931), composer
- Eugène Ionesco (1909–1994), Romanian playwright
- Jean-Robert Ipoustéguy (1920–2006), French sculptor
- Joris Ivens (1898–1989), Dutch filmmaker

== J ==
- Jean Bernard Jauréguiberry (1815–1887), admiral and statesman
- Joëlle (1953–1982), American-born French singer
- Yves Jouffa (1953–1982), Holocaust survivor
- Geneviève Joy (1919–2009), French classical and modernist pianist
- Lionel Jospin (1937–2026), Prime Minister of France

== K ==
- Gustave Kahn, (1859–1936), poet and art critic
- Joseph Kessel (1898–1979), writer
- Kiki (1901–1953), singer, actress, painter, "Queen of Montparnasse" (although she was probably buried in Thiais)
- Adamantios Korais (1748–1833), Greek writer and philosopher
- Cornelius Castoriadis (1922–1997), Greek writer and philosopher

== L ==
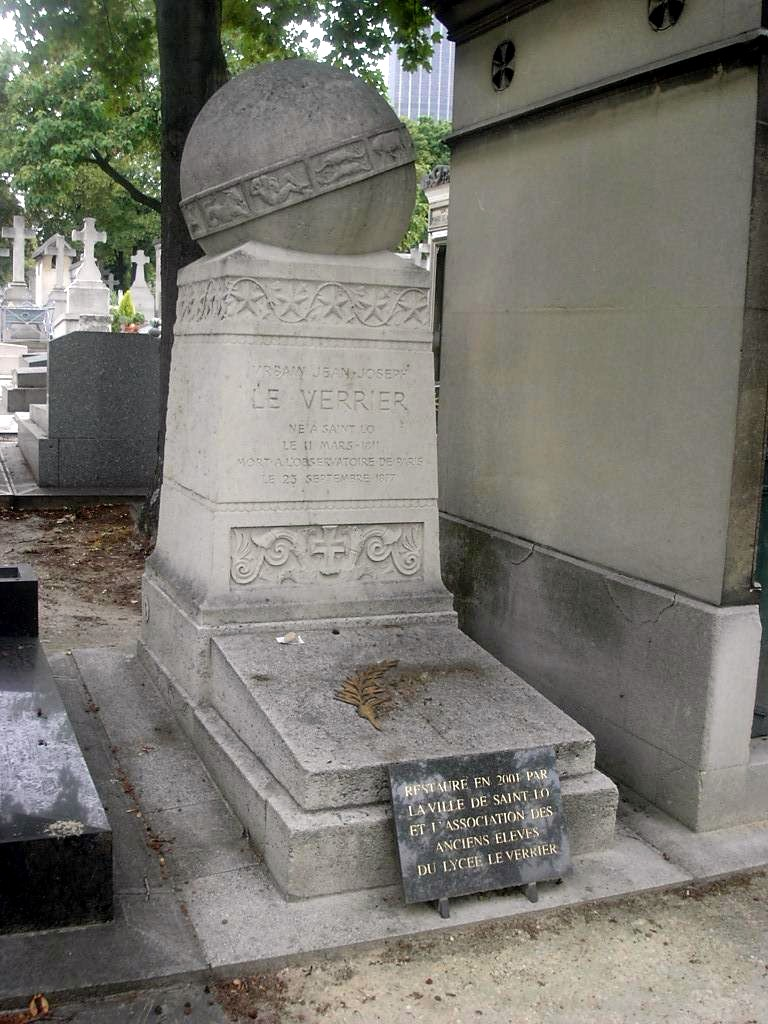
Grave of Urbain Le Verrier

- Bernard Lacoste (1931–2006), president of Lacoste apparel company, son of René Lacoste
- Jean-Baptiste Lamarck (1744–1829), naturalist and zoologist (unearthed in 1834, lost body)
- Paul-Gilbert Langevin (1933–1986), musicologist
- Henri Langlois (1914–1977), film preservationist
- Pierre Larousse (1817–1875), author of encyclopedia Larousse Gastronomique
- Henri Laurens (1885–1954), sculptor, engraver
- Pierre Laval (1883–1945), Prime Minister.
- Alphonse Laveran (1845–1922), physician, parasitologist
- Maurice Leblanc (1864–1941), creator of Arsène Lupin, novelist
- Charles Marie René Leconte de Lisle (1818–1894), poet
- Alexandre Lenoir (1761–1839), archaeologist
- Philippe Léotard (1940–2001), teacher, actor, poet, singer
- Urbain Le Verrier (1811–1877), astronomer and mathematician
- André Lhote (1885–1962), painter and sculptor
- Jacques Lisfranc (1790–1847), gynecologist and surgeon
- Émile Littré (1801–1881) lexicographer, philosopher
- Baltasar Lobo (1910–1993), Spanish sculptor
- Sylvia Lopez (1931–1959), actress
- Herbert Lottman (1927–2014), American biographer
- Louis Loucheur (1872–1931), statesman
- Pierre Louÿs (1870–1925), poet, romance novelist

== M ==
- Ambrose Dudley Mann (1801–1889), Commissioner of the Confederate States of America for Belgium and the Vatican
- René Maran (1887–1960), intellectual, author
- Chris Marker (1921–2012), filmmaker, writer, photographer
- Gaston Maspero (1846–1916), Egyptologist
- Guy de Maupassant (1850–1893), author
- Rosita Mauri (1849–1923), principal ballerina at the Paris Opera
- Claude Mauriac (1914–1996), author
- René Mayer (1895–1972), former Prime Minister of France
- Catulle Mendès (1841–1909), poet, man of letters
- Adah Isaacs Menken (1835–1868), actress, poet
- Ricardo Menon (1952–1989), artist, assistant and friend of Niki de Saint Phalle (who designed the tomb: Chat de Ricardo, one of the most notable sculptures in the cemetery).
- André Meyer (1898–1979), French/American financier
- Charles-Joseph Minard (1781–1870), French data visualization pioneer
- Mireille (1906–1996), singer, composer
- Éliane Montel (1898–1992), physicist and Paul Langevin's partner
- Maria Montez (1912–1951), actress
- Vincent de Moro-Giafferi (1878–1956), lawyer and statesman
- Michèle Morgan (1920–2016), actress
- Edgar Morin (1921–2026), philosopher and sociologist
- Jean Mounet-Sully (1841–1916), actor
- Philippe Muray (1945–2006), essayist and novelist

== N ==
- Philippe Noiret (1930–2006), actor
- Max Nordau (1849–1923), Zionist leader, physician, author

== O ==
- Mathieu Orfila (1787–1853), toxicologist, chemist
- Gérard Oury (1919–2006), director

== P ==
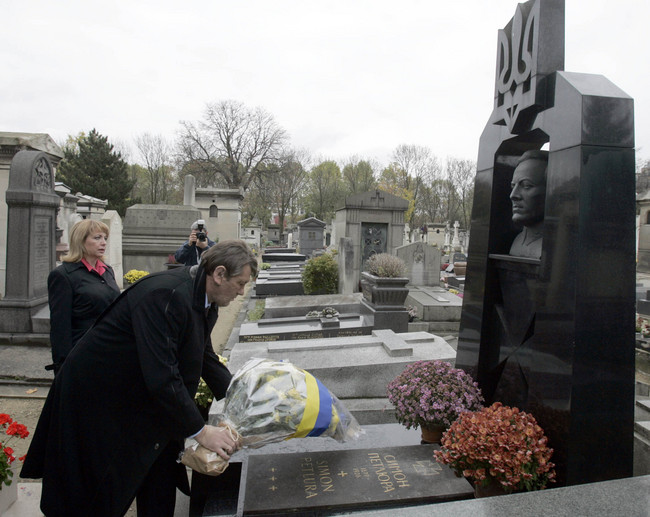
Viktor Yushchenko at the grave of Symon Petliura

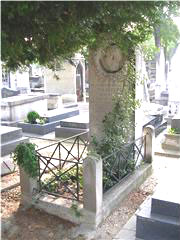
Grave of François Pouqueville

- Pan Yuliang (1895–1977), Chinese painter
- Jean-Claude Pascal (1927–1992), singer and actor
- Adolphe Pégoud (1889–1915), aviator
- Auguste Perret (1874–1954), architect
- Bénédicte Pesle (1927–2018), arts patron
- Symon Petliura (1879–1926), Ukrainian leader
- Maurice Pialat (1925–2003), film director
- Pierre Piérade (1884–1937), comedian, music hall performer and actor
- Charles Pigeon (1838–1915), engineer, inventor and manufacturer
- Jules Henri Poincaré, (1854–1912), mathematician and physicist
- Jean Poiret (1926–1992), actor, film director
- Nicos Poulantzas (1936–1979), sociologist
- François Charles Henri Laurent Pouqueville (1770–1838), diplomat, writer, historian, archaeologist, physician
- Pierre-Joseph Proudhon, (1809–1865), philosopher and statesman
- Visarion Puiu (1879–1964), Romanian metropolitan bishop

== Q ==
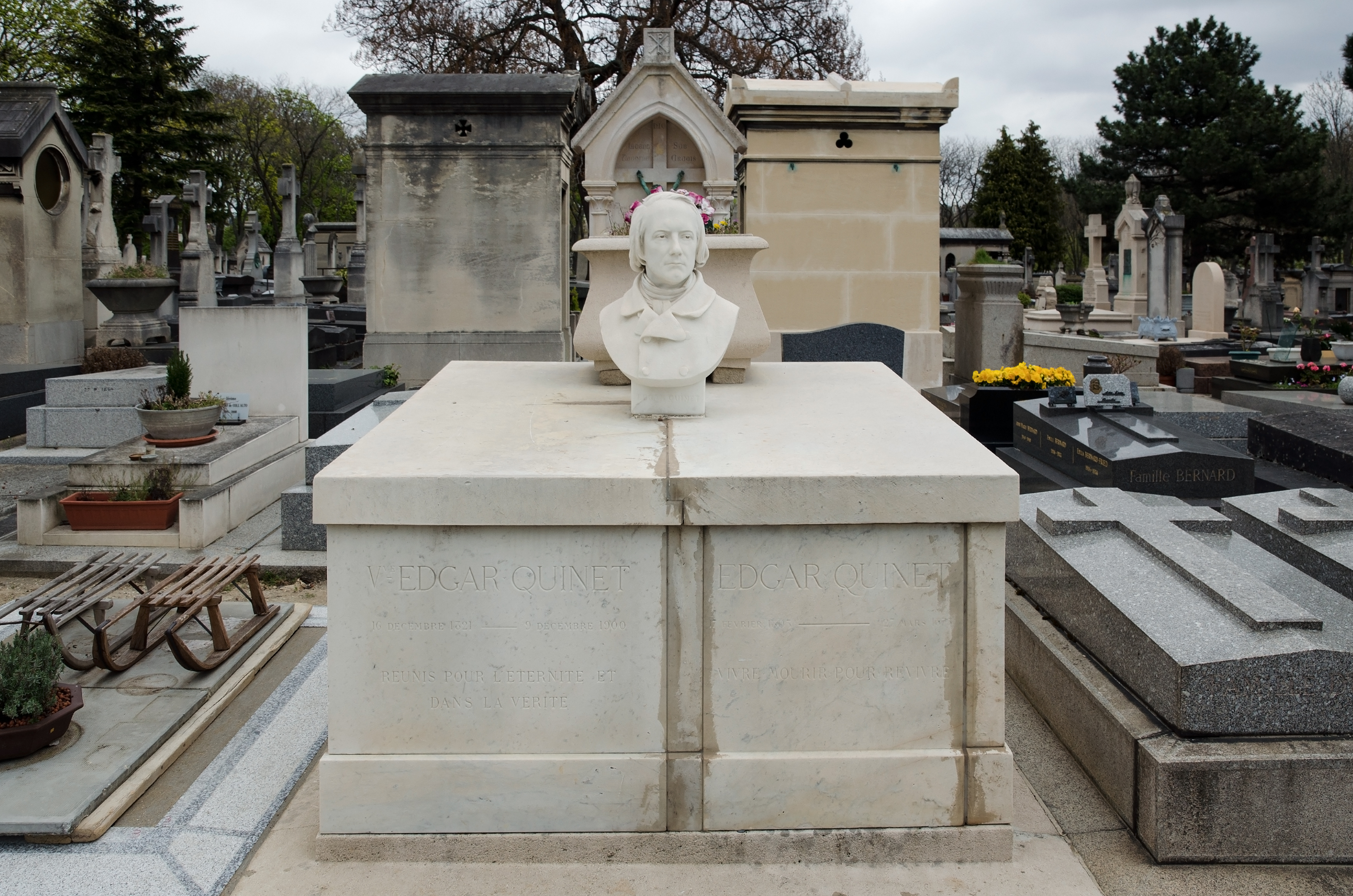
Grave of Edgar Quinet

- Valérie Quennessen (1957–1989), theatre and film actress
- Edgar Quinet (1803–1875), historian

== R ==
- Tania Rachevskaia (1887–1910), Russian medical student and alleged anarchist. Her grave is renowned because it is adorned with The Kiss by Constantin Brâncuși.
- Denis Auguste Marie Raffet (1804–1860), painter
- Jean-Pierre Rampal (1922–2000), flautist
- Fanny Raoul (1771–1833), feminist writer, journalist, philosopher and essayist
- Man Ray (1890–1976), American-born Dada and Surrealist artist and photographer, with his wife Juliet
- Serge Reggiani (1922–2004), singer, actor
- Jean-Marc Reiser (1941–1983), comic artist
- Rosalie Rendu (1786–1856), daughter of charity
- Pierre Restany (1930–2003), art critic
- Paul Reynaud (1878–1966), lawyer and statesman
- Moune de Rivel (1918-2014), singer-songwriter, musician and actress
- Yves Robert (1920–2002), actor, director
- Yves Rocard (1903–1992), physicist
- Éric Rohmer (1920–2010), film director
- Nicolae Rosetti-Bălănescu (1827–1884), Romanian politician
- Frédéric Rossif (1922–1990), filmmaker
- Gustave Roussy (1874–1948), Swiss-born neuropathologist and oncologist
- François Rude (1784–1855), sculptor
- Julio Ruelas (1870–1907), Mexican painter
- Heinrich Daniel Ruhmkorff (1803–1877), German inventor

== S ==
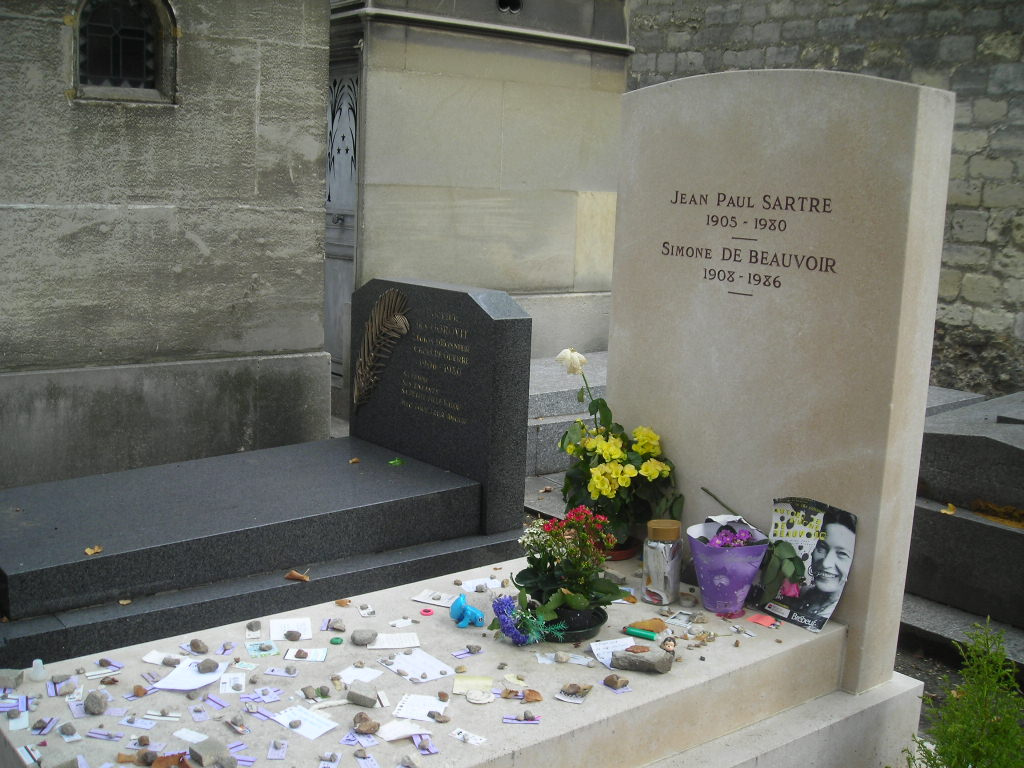
Grave of Jean-Paul Sartre and Simone de Beauvoir

- Jean Sablon (1906–1994), singer
- Charles Augustin Sainte-Beuve (1804–1869), literary critic, author
- Camille Saint-Saëns (1835–1921), composer & performer of Romantic classical music
- Jules Sandeau (1811–1883), novelist
- Jean-Paul Sartre (1905–1980), French philosopher & novelist
- Claude Sautet (1924–2000), film director
- Georges Schehadé (1905–1989), Lebanese poet and playwright
- Pierre Schoendoerffer (1928-2012), writer and filmmaker
- Jean Seberg (1938–1979), American actress and civil rights activist
- Pierre Seghers (1906–1987), poet and editor
- Delphine Seyrig (1932–1990), actress
- Susan Sontag (1933–2004), American author and philosopher
- Jesús Rafael Soto (1923–2005), Venezuelan kinetic sculptor and painter
- Chaïm Soutine (1893–1943), painter of the School of Paris

== T ==
- Boris Taslitzky (1911–2005), painter
- Blanka Teleki (1806-1862), Hungarian noblewoman
- Augustin Thierry (1795–1856), historian
- Roland Topor (1938–1997), writer, illustrator
- Henri Troyat (1911–2007), author
- Tristan Tzara (1896–1963), Romanian Dadaist poet and essayist

== U ==
- Stanisław Ulam (1909–1984), Polish mathematician, with his wife Françoise Aron Ulam.

== V ==
- Carlos Valenti (1888–1912), painter
- César Vallejo (1892–1938), Peruvian poet
- Agnès Varda (1928–2019), filmmaker
- Jacques Vergès (1925–2013), lawyer
- Louis Veuillot (1813–1883), journalist
- Paul Vidal de la Blache (1845–1918), geographer
- Louis Vierne (1870–1937), composer, organist
- Andrée Viollis (1870–1950), journalist and writer

== W ==
- Henri-Alexandre Wallon (1812–1904), historian, statesman
- Adolphe Willette (1857–1926), painter
- Bronisława Wieniawa-Długoszowska (1886–1953), buried under the name 'Jeanne-Liliane Lalande'. She spied for French military intelligence during the Bolshevik revolution.
- Georges Wolinski (1934–2015) Political cartoonist; writer; assassinated at Charlie Hebdo January 7, 2015

== Z ==
- Ossip Zadkine (1890–1967), Russian-born sculptor and artist
- Sabine Zlatin (1907–1996), Polish-born humanitarian who hid Jewish children during the Holocaust
