= The Kiss (Brâncuși sculpture) =

Sculpture by Constantin Brâncuși

Coordinates: 48.8382°N 2.3261°E

- Le Baiser (French)
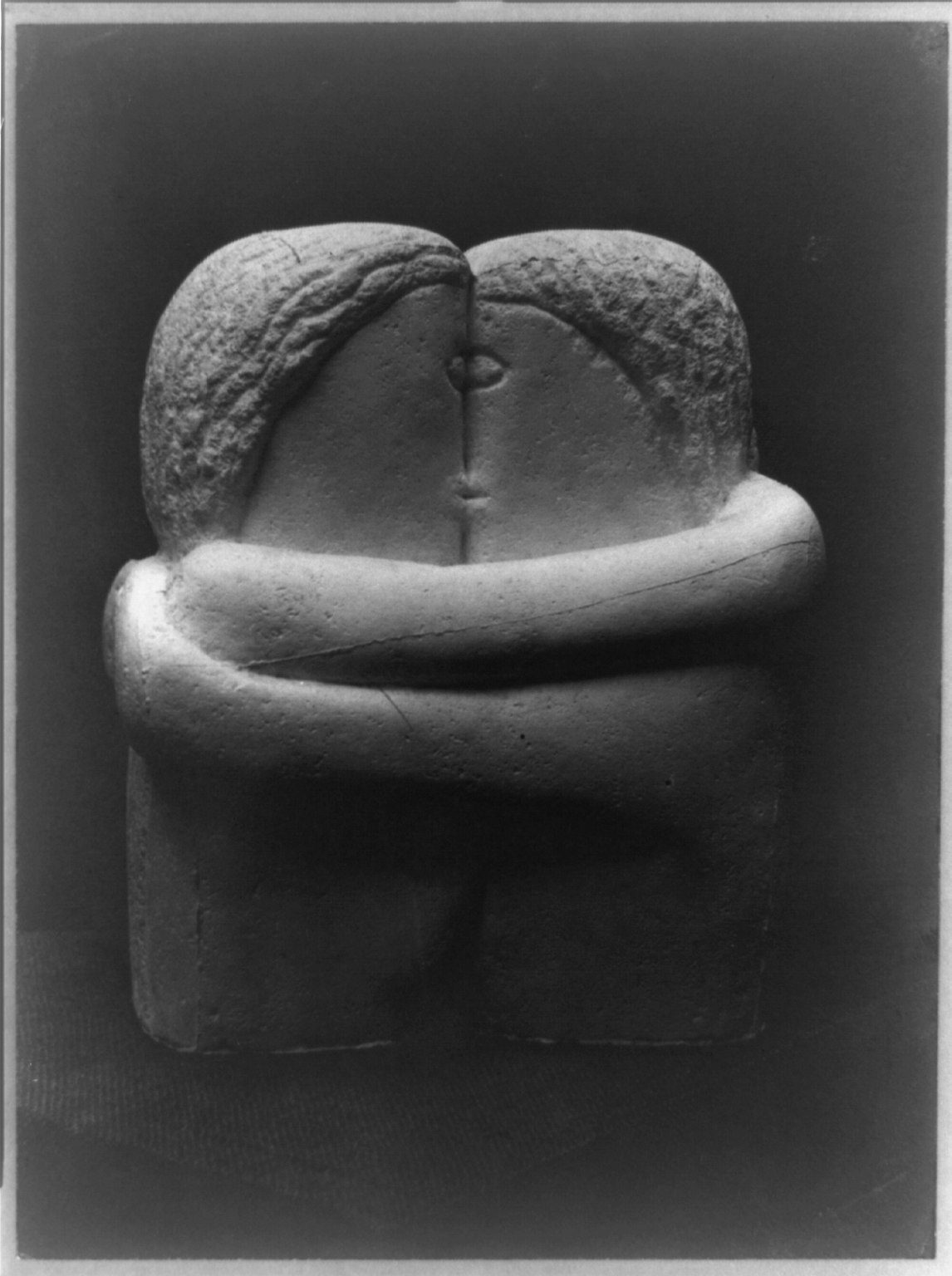
- Artist: Constantin Brâncuși
- Year: 1907-08
- Type: Plaster sculpture
- Dimensions: 27.9 x 26 x 21.6 cm (11 x 10.25 x 8.5 in)
- Location: Possibly the Rockefeller-Latner cast

The Kiss (in Romanian: Sărutul /səˈrutul/) is a sculpture by Romanian Modernist sculptor Constantin Brâncuși. It is an early example of his proto-cubist style of non-literal representation. This sculpture is considered the first modern sculpture of the twentieth century.

This plaster was exhibited at the 1913 Armory Show and published in the Chicago Tribune of 25 March 1913. This early plaster sculpture is one of six casts that Brancusi made of the 1907–08 The Kiss.

It is a symbolistic work of two lovers embracing, a theme represented in numerous pieces of art full of erotism, from Auguste Rodin and Edvard Munch, to Gustave Klimt.

== Versions ==
The original Marne stone carving is at Craiova Art Museum, in Romania.

Brâncuși created many versions of The Kiss, further simplifying geometric forms and sparse objects in each version, tending each time further toward abstraction. His abstract style emphasizes simple geometrical lines that balance forms inherent in his materials with the symbolic allusions of representational art. Here, the shape of the original block of material is maintained. Another version of The Kiss serves as an adornment of a tomb in Montparnasse cemetery in Paris, France but has since August 2017 been covered up in a box.

Another version still can be seen at the Philadelphia Museum of Art.

This version of The Kiss is one of the artist's most well known works, along with Sleeping Muse (1908), Prometheus (1911), Mademoiselle Pogany (1913), The Newborn (1915), Bird in Space (1919) and The Column of the Infinite (Coloana infinitului), known as The Endless Column (1938).
