= Charles Pigeon =

French engineer

Charles-Joseph Pigeon (29 March 1838 – 18 March 1915) was born in Le Mesnil-Lieubray in Normandy in France.

He started as a salesman in Le Bon Marché in Paris, where he became a close friend of Ernest Cognacq, subsequently the founder of the Samaritaine department store.

Pigeon became a dealer in cycle lamps and other lamps. His invention and manufacture of the Pigeon lamp, a non-exploding gasoline lamp, in 1884 (exhibited at the Exposition universelle de 1900), made him famous and wealthy.

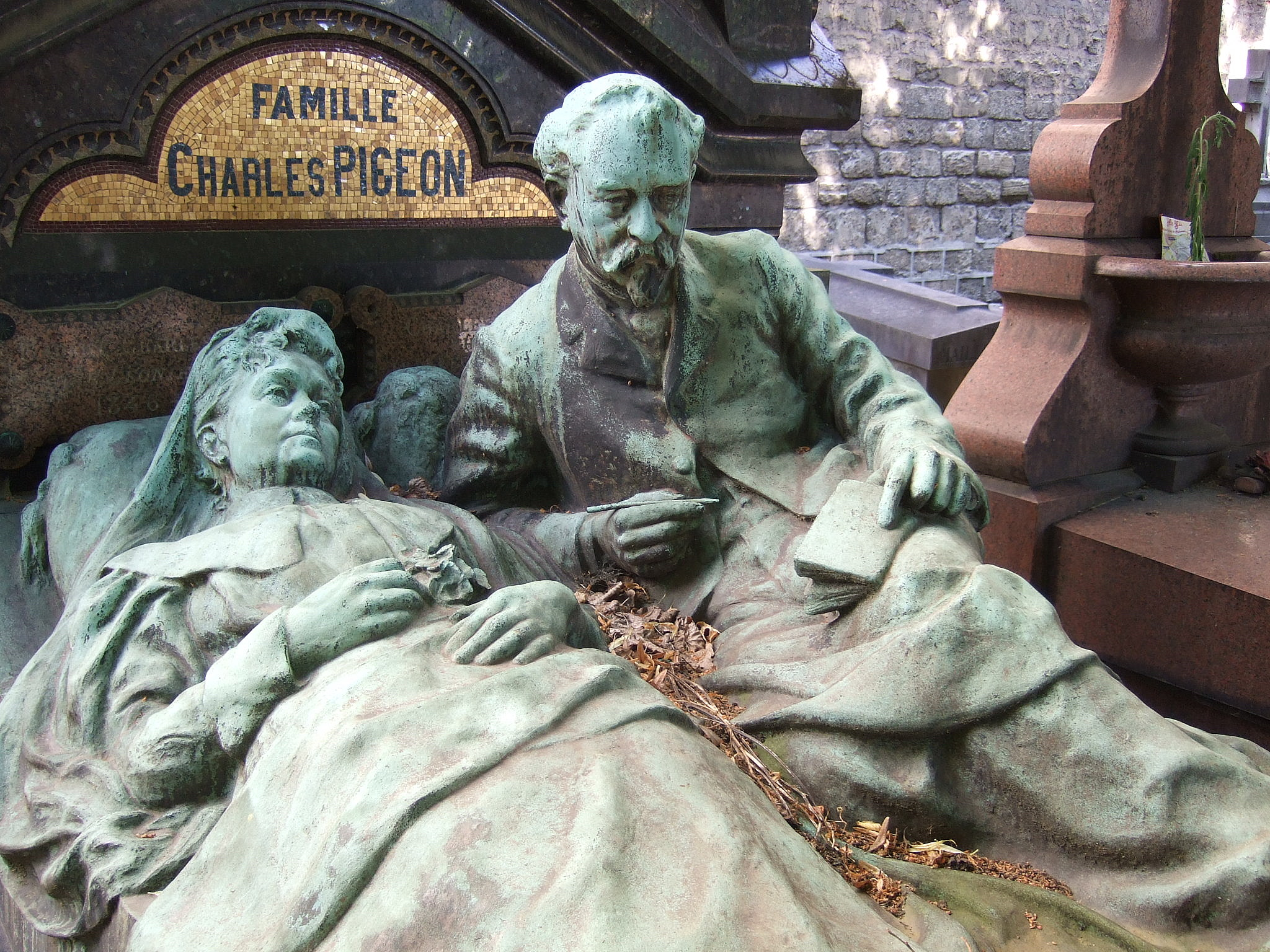
Grave of Charles Pigeon in Montparnasse

After his death he remains noted for his family grave in Montparnasse Cemetery in Paris, which he commissioned in 1905 to hold up to 18 family members. The main feature is a life-sized bronze sculpture of Pigeon (notebook and pencil in hand) and his wife lying on a bed, overlooked by an angel, which had been illuminated by a lamp for many years by his custodians.

== Sources and external links ==
- Insecula.com: brief biography and photo of the monument (in French)
- Personal travel website: translation of Insecula article
- Flickr: photographs of Pigeon lamps
- Personal travel blog: article about and photos of Montparnasse Cemetery
- Daily Telegraph: description of tomb
- Essorensen.com: Details of components of Pigeon lamp
- Lampe Pigeon, reports of the international jury of the Exposition universelle de 1900 (in French)
