= Rosalie Rendu =

French Catholic religious sister and social reformer (1786–1856)

Blessed Rosalie Rendu D.C.
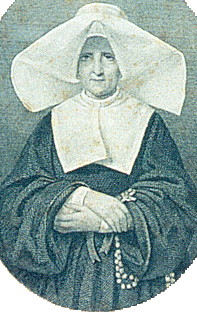
- Born: 9 September 1786; Confort, Ain, Kingdom of France
- Died: 7 February 1856 (aged 69); Paris, France
- Venerated in: Catholic Church
- Beatified: 9 November 2003, St. Peter's Basilica by Pope John Paul II
- Feast: 7 February

Rosalie Rendu, DC (born Jeanne-Marie Rendu; 9 September 1786 – 7 February 1856) was a French Catholic member of the Daughters of Charity who organized care for the poor in the Paris slums during the Industrial Revolution. She was beatified in the Catholic Church in 2003.

== Biography ==
She was born Jeanne-Marie Rendu on 9 September 1786, in Confort, France, not far from Geneva. The eldest of four girls, she came from a family of small property owners which enjoyed a certain affluence and respect throughout the area. She was baptized the day she was born in the parish church of Lancrans. Her godfather by proxy was Jacques Emery, a family friend and future superior general of the Sulpicians in Paris.

Rendu was three years old when the French Revolution broke out. Starting in 1790, it was compulsory for the clergy to take an oath of support for the Civil Constitution of the Clergy. Numerous priests, faithful to the Catholic Church, refused to take this oath. They were driven from their parishes, with some being put to death and others having to hide to escape their pursuers. The Rendu family home became a refuge for these priests, some fleeing to Switzerland. The Bishop of Annecy found asylum there under the assumed name of Pierre. Jeanne-Marie was fascinated by this hired hand who was treated better than the others. One night she discovered that he was celebrating a Mass.

It was in this atmosphere of faith, exposed to the dangers of denunciation, that Rendu was educated. She made her First Communion one night by candlelight in the basement of her home. This environment forged her character.

The death of her father, 12 May 1796, and that of her youngest sister, at four months of age, on 19 July of the same year, shook the entire family. Rendu, aware of her responsibility as the eldest, helped her mother, especially in caring for her younger sisters. Madame Rendu, concerned about the education of her eldest daughter, sent her to the Ursuline Sisters in Gex. Jeanne-Marie stayed two years in this boarding school. She was "highly intelligent" but her education was essentially practical.

During her walks in town, Rendu discovered the hospital where the Daughters of Charity cared for the sick. She had only one desire: to go and join them. Her mother gave her consent that Jeanne-Marie, in spite of her young age at just 15, might spend some time at this hospital. There she gained some experience in caring for the sick.

=== Daughter of Charity ===
Having decided to join the Daughters of Charity, on 25 May 1802, Rendu arrived at the motherhouse on the Rue du Vieux Colombier in Paris. She was nearly 16 years old. The reopening of the novitiate (suppressed by the revolutionaries) took place in December 1800. On their arrival, the travelers were welcomed by 50 young women in formation. Upon entering the community, she was given the name of Rosalie.

As a young sister, Rendu had a delicate constitution that was weakened by the sustained seclusion required of the novices, and by a lack of physical exercise. On the advice of her physician and that of her godfather, the Abbé Emery, Rendu was sent to house of the Daughters of Charity on Rue des Francs-Bourgeois-Saint-Marcel in the Mouffetard District. She remained there 54 years.

At the time, it was one of the most impoverished districts of the quickly expanding capital, with poverty in all its forms, psychological and spiritual. The houses were dilapidated and damp, the streets narrow and squalid, with refuse-filled streams running across them. She made her "apprenticeship" accompanying sisters visiting the sick and the poor. Between times, she taught catechism and reading to girls accepted at the free school. In 1807, Rendu, surrounded by the sisters of her community, made her first vows.

==== Sister Servant ====
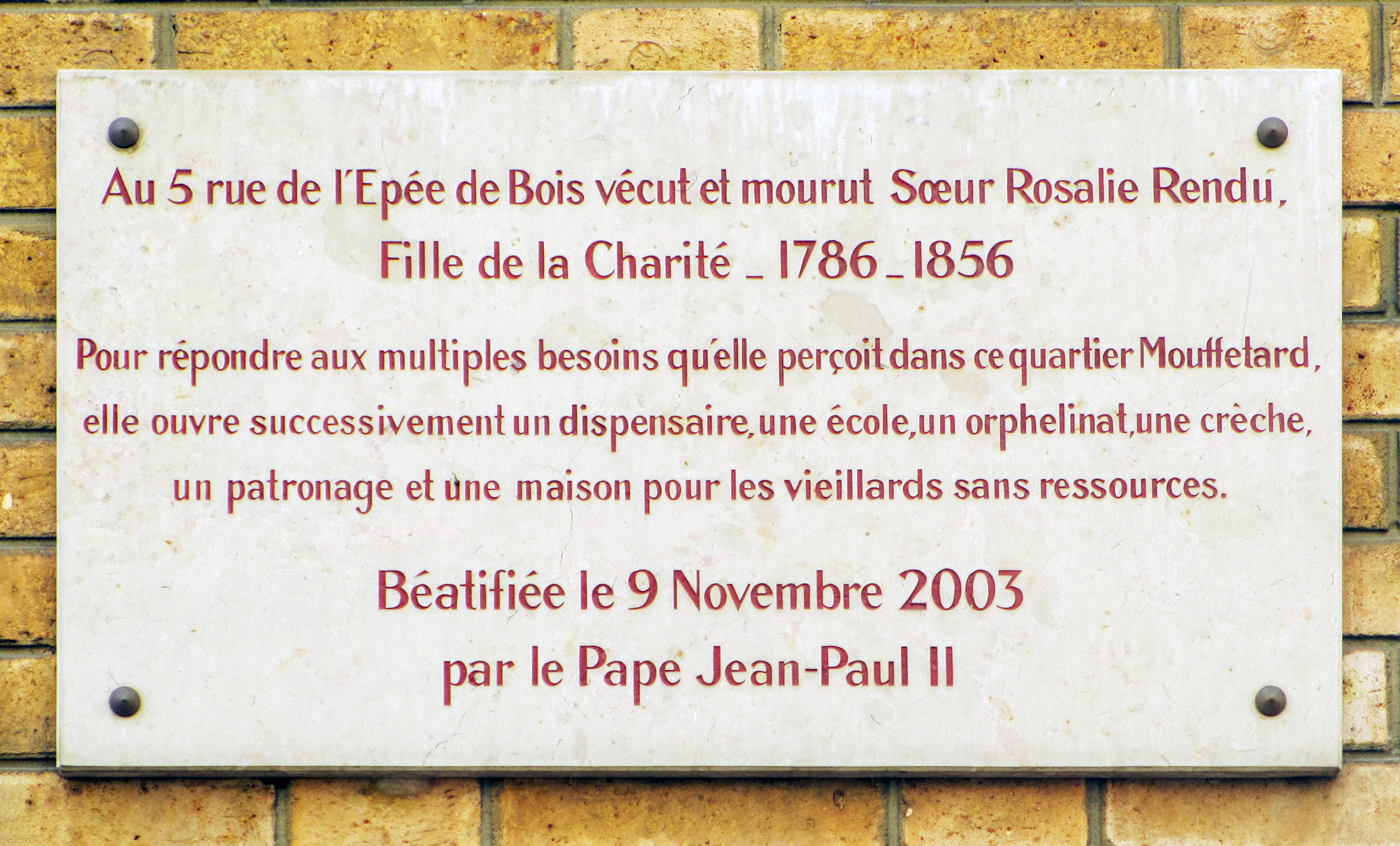
Soeur Rosalie Rendu plaque - 3 rue de lÉpée de Bois, Paris 5

In 1815 Rendu became the sister servant (local religious superior) of the community at the Rue des Francs-Bourgeois. Two years later, the community would move to the Rue de l'Épée de Bois for reasons of space and convenience. "Her poor," as she would call them, became more and more numerous during this troubled time. She worked with the Department of Welfare established by the Napoleonic government, administering a program that provided vouchers for coal and food. She sent her sisters into all the hidden recesses of St. Médard Parish to bring supplies, clothing, care and a comforting word.

Rendu emphasized treating the poor with dignity. She stated: "One of the greatest ways of doing good to the poor is to show them respect and consideration."

Rendu's superiors sent her postulants and young sisters to train, and assigned sisters who needed additional support to her house. As the community grew, the charity office expanded into a house of charity that included a clinic and a school.

In the outbreaks which followed the Revolution of 1830 Archbishop Hyacinthe-Louis de Quélen of Paris and other clergy took shelter at the Rue de l'Épée de Bois. To assist all the suffering, Rendu opened a free clinic, a pharmacy, a school, a child and maternal care center, a youth club for young workers and a home for the elderly without resources. For young girls and needy mothers, Rendu soon organized courses in sewing and embroidering. Soon a whole network of charitable services would be established to counter poverty.

Rendu attracted support from a range of benefactors, including members of the clergy, government, and nobility.

In 1833, Rendu began mentoring students who became the first members of the Society of Saint Vincent de Paul, including Frédéric Ozanam and Jean Léon Le Prevost, future founder of the Religious of St. Vincent de Paul.

In 1840 she helped re-establish the Ladies of Charity, who helped in the home visits. In 1851 she took over the running of an orphanage. Rendu also formed a relationship with the superior of the Daughters in Bon Saveur, Caen, and requested that she too welcome those in need. She was particularly attentive to priests and religious suffering from psychiatric difficulties. Her correspondence is short but touching, considerate, patient and respectful towards all.

Hardships were not lacking in the Mouffesard District. Epidemics of cholera followed one after another. Lack of hygiene and poverty fostered its virulence. Most particularly in 1832 and 1846, the dedication shown and risks taken by Rendu and her sisters were beyond imagination. The sisters attended to the living, accompanied the dying, and buried the dead. She herself was seen picking up dead bodies in the streets.

In February 1848, working-class uprisings marked by street battles and barricades erupted across Paris. Denis Auguste Affre, the Archbishop of Paris, was killed while attempting to mediate between the opposing factions. Moved by his death, Rendu went to the barricades to assist the wounded, regardless of their political affiliations. She risked her life in these confrontations. When order was restored, she worked to protect a number of individuals she knew who were facing harsh reprisals. She was assisted in these efforts by the mayor of the district, Dr. Ulysse Trélat, a republican who held considerable local standing.

In 1852, Napoleon III decided to give her the Grand Cross of the Legion of Honor. She was ready to refuse this individual honor but Jean-Baptiste Etienne, superior general of the Congregation of the Mission and the Daughters of Charity, made her accept it.

=== Death ===
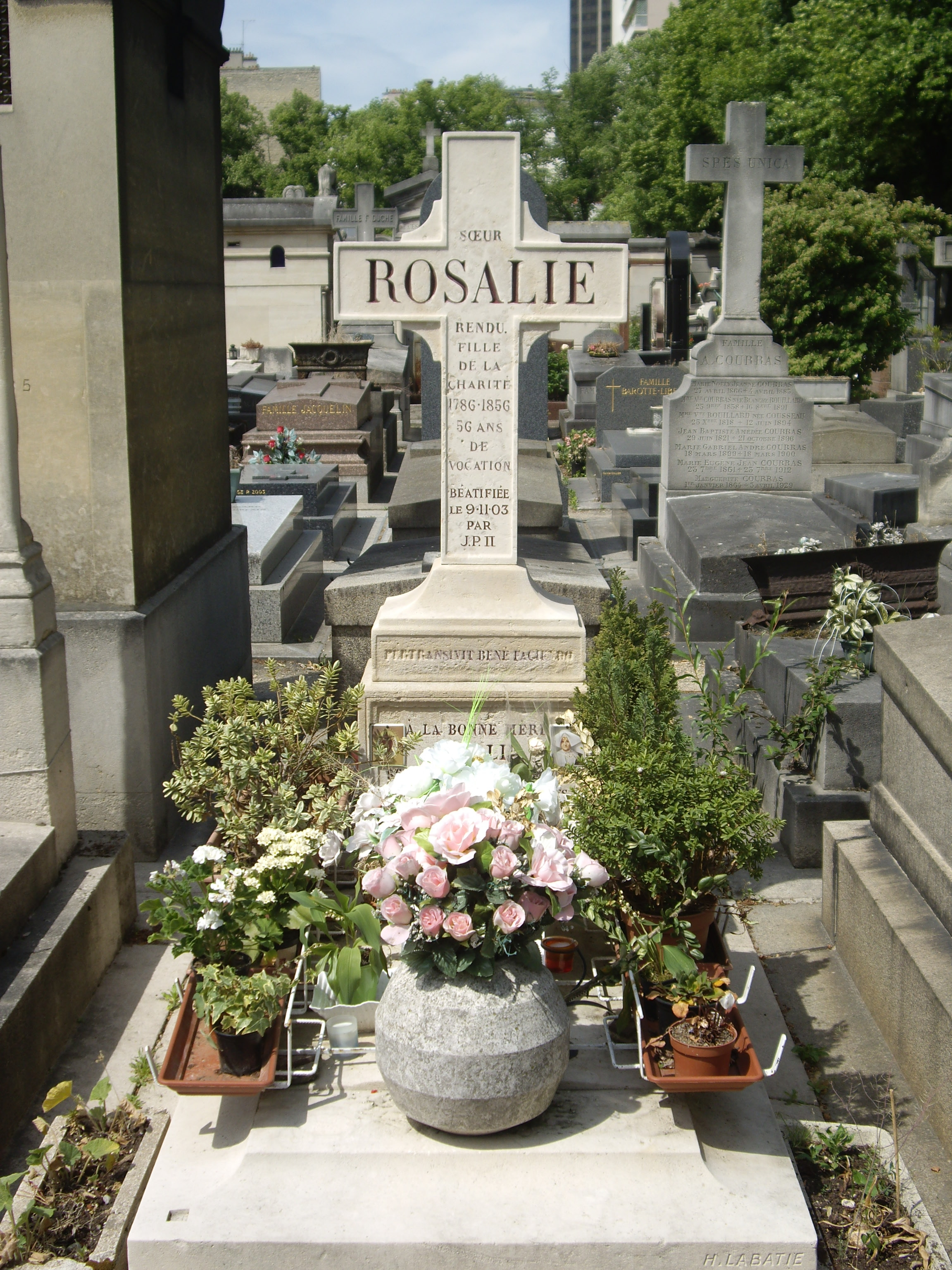
Tombe Rosalie Rendu, Cimetière du Montparnasse

During the last two years of her life, Rendu became progressively blind. She died on 7 February 1856 after a brief illness.

Her funeral was held at St. Médard Church, after which a large crowd followed her remains to Montparnasse Cemetery.

L'Univers, the principal Catholic newspaper of the time, edited by Louis Veuillot, wrote: "Our readers understand the significance of the sadness that has come upon the poor of Paris. They join their sufferings with the tears and prayers of the unfortunate". Le Constitutionnel, the newspaper of the anti-clerical left, announced her death: "The unfortunate people of the 12th district have just experienced a regrettable loss. Sr. Rosalie, Superior of the Community at rue de l'Epée de Bois died yesterday after a long illness. For many years this respectable woman was the salvation of the numerous needy in this district". The official newspaper of the French Empire, le Moniteur Universel, wrote: "Funeral honors were given to Sr. Rosalie with unusual splendor. For more than fifty years this holy woman was a friend to others in a district where there are many unfortunate people to care for and all these grateful people accompanied her remains to the church and to the cemetery. A guard of honor was part of the cortege".

== Legacy ==
=== Veneration ===
Many visitors came to Rendu's grave to meditate and pray but had difficulty locating the common gravesite reserved for the Daughters of Charity. The body was then moved to a more accessible plot, close to the entrance of the cemetery. On the simple tomb surmounted by a large Cross are engraved these words: "To Sister Rosalie, from her grateful friends, the rich and the poor". Flowers continue to be placed at her gravesite.

She was beatified on the 9th of November, 2003 by Pope John Paul II.
